= List of smallest galaxies =

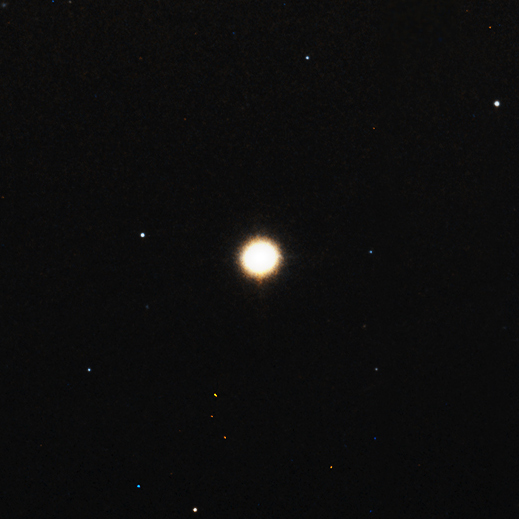
M60-UCD1 is one of the smallest and densest known galaxies.

Below is a list of the smallest known galaxies ordered by their diameters. Every galaxy on this list is below 20,000 light-years and they are sorted in sorted in ascending order.

== List ==
List of smallest known galaxies
| Name | Diameter (light-years) | Notes |
|---|---|---|
| M85-HCC1 | 12.06 ± 5.87 | Could be a star cluster instead of a galaxy. |
| Ursa Major III | 31.3 | Could be a star cluster instead of a galaxy. |
| Aquarius IV | 123.9 | Ultra-faint dwarf Milky Way satellite. |
| M59-UCD3 | 130.4 | |
| M60-UCD1 | 158 ± 3.26 | Potential smallest known non-disputed galaxy. |
| Segue 1 | 189.1 | Ultra-faint dwarf Milky Way satellite. |
| Andromeda XXXV | 345.7 | Ultra-faint dwarf Andromeda satellite. |
| Andromeda XXXVI | 417.4 | Ultra-faint dwarf Andromeda satellite. |
| MoM-z14 | 482.7 | The smallest galaxy known in the early Universe. |
| GN-z11 | 1,304.6 | |
| Leo I | 1591.6 | |
| Andromeda XVIII | 2.120 | |
| Ursa Minor Dwarf | 2739.7 | |
| UGC 11411 | 5,610.1 | |
| UGC 6541 | 5,740.6 | |
| Messier 32 | 8,023.7 | |
| Sextans A | 7,990.8 | |
| NGC 4118 | 8,088.6 | |
| Sextans B | 8,904 | |
| NGC 6822 | 9,197.6 | |
| Messier 110 | 17,057.9 | |
| Small Magellanic Cloud | 18,851.8 | |

== See also ==
- List of largest galaxies
- List of smallest stars
