= Laevens 1 =

Faint globular cluster within the Milky Way's Outer Halo

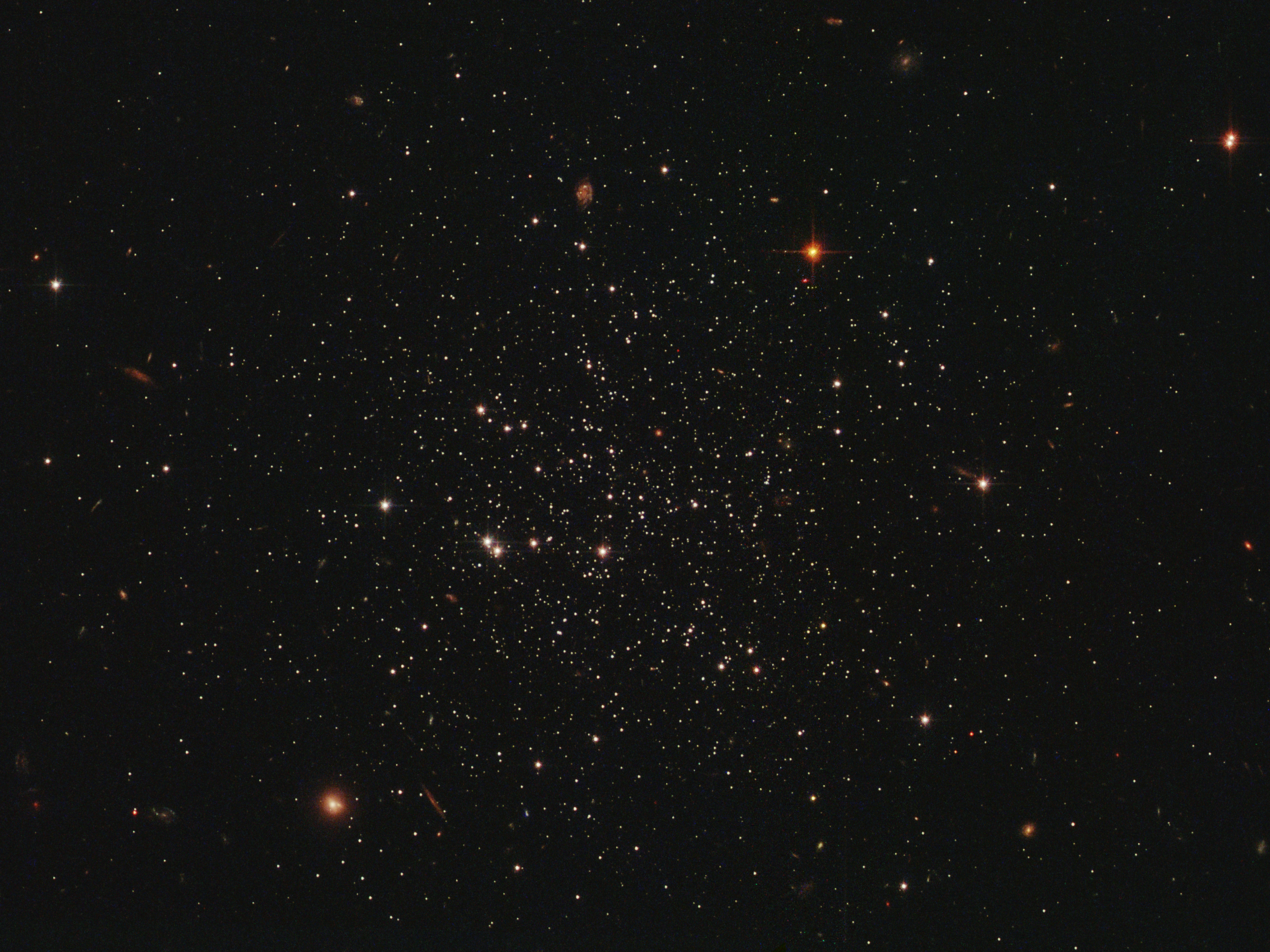
- Laevens 1

Observation data (J2000 epoch)
- Constellation: Crater
- Right ascension: 11^{h} 36^{m} 16.2^{s}
- Declination: –10° 52′ 38.8″
- Distance: 145 kiloparsecs (470 kly)
- Apparent dimensions (V): 0.46 arcmins

Physical characteristics
- Absolute magnitude: −5.3
- Mass: 1×10^{4} M_{☉}
- Radius: 50 parsecs (160 ly)
- V_{HB}: 14.2
- Metallicity: [Fe/H] = –1.65 dex
- Estimated age: 7.5 Gyr
- Notable features: Unusually young and distant Milky way cluster.
- Other designations: Crater cluster, PSO J174.0675-10.8774

Laevens 1 is a faint globular cluster in the constellation Crater that was discovered in 2014. It is also known as Crater, the Crater cluster and PSO J174.0675-10.8774.

At a distance of 145 kiloparsecs (470 kly) it is the most distant Milky Way globular cluster yet known, located in the galactic halo surrounding the Milky Way galaxy. With an age of only 7.5 Gyr, it is likely to have been incorporated into our galaxy long after the formation of the Milky Way, probably during an interaction with the Small Magellanic Cloud.

Some analyses initially categorized it as a satellite galaxy, because of the presence of a handful of blue loop stars and a sparsely populated red clump; the existence of some of these types of stars in Laevens 1 would imply relatively recent star formation (within 400 Myr). Such recent formation would be very atypical for a globular cluster; more recent work suggests that some of these stars were erroneously assigned membership of the cluster, distorting the overall result. After removing these, the subsequent reanalysis concluded that Laevens 1 is a faint, intermediate-age globular cluster.

Laevens 1 is orbiting the galaxy at approximately the same distance as the ultrafaint dwarf galaxies Leo IV and Leo V. This hints that all three satellites may once have been closely associated before falling together into the Milky Way halo.

== See also ==
- Globular cluster
- Dwarf spheroidal galaxy
