= Dwarf galaxy =

Small galaxy composed of up to several billion stars

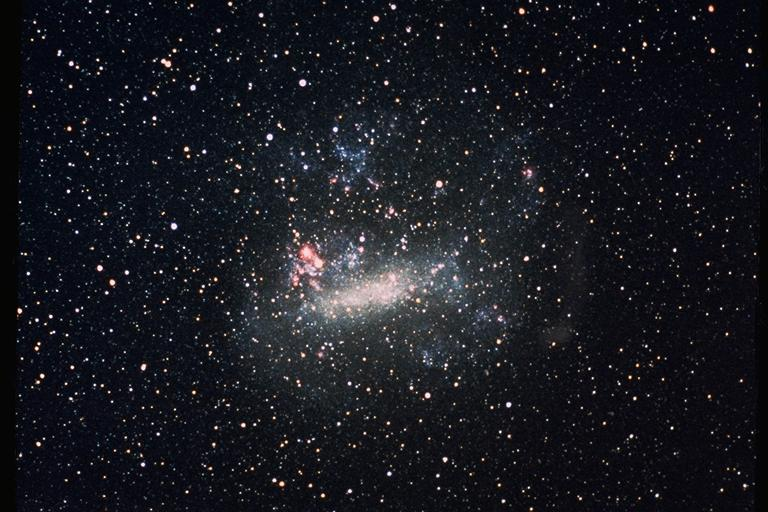
The Large Magellanic Cloud, a satellite galaxy of the Milky Way

A dwarf galaxy is a small galaxy composed of about 1,000 up to several billion stars, as compared to the Milky Way's 100–400 billion stars. The Large Magellanic Cloud, which closely orbits the Milky Way and contains over 30 billion stars, is sometimes classified as a dwarf galaxy; others consider it a full-fledged galaxy. Dwarf galaxies' formation and activity are thought to be heavily influenced by interactions with larger galaxies. Astronomers identify numerous types of dwarf galaxies, based on their shape and composition.

== Formation ==
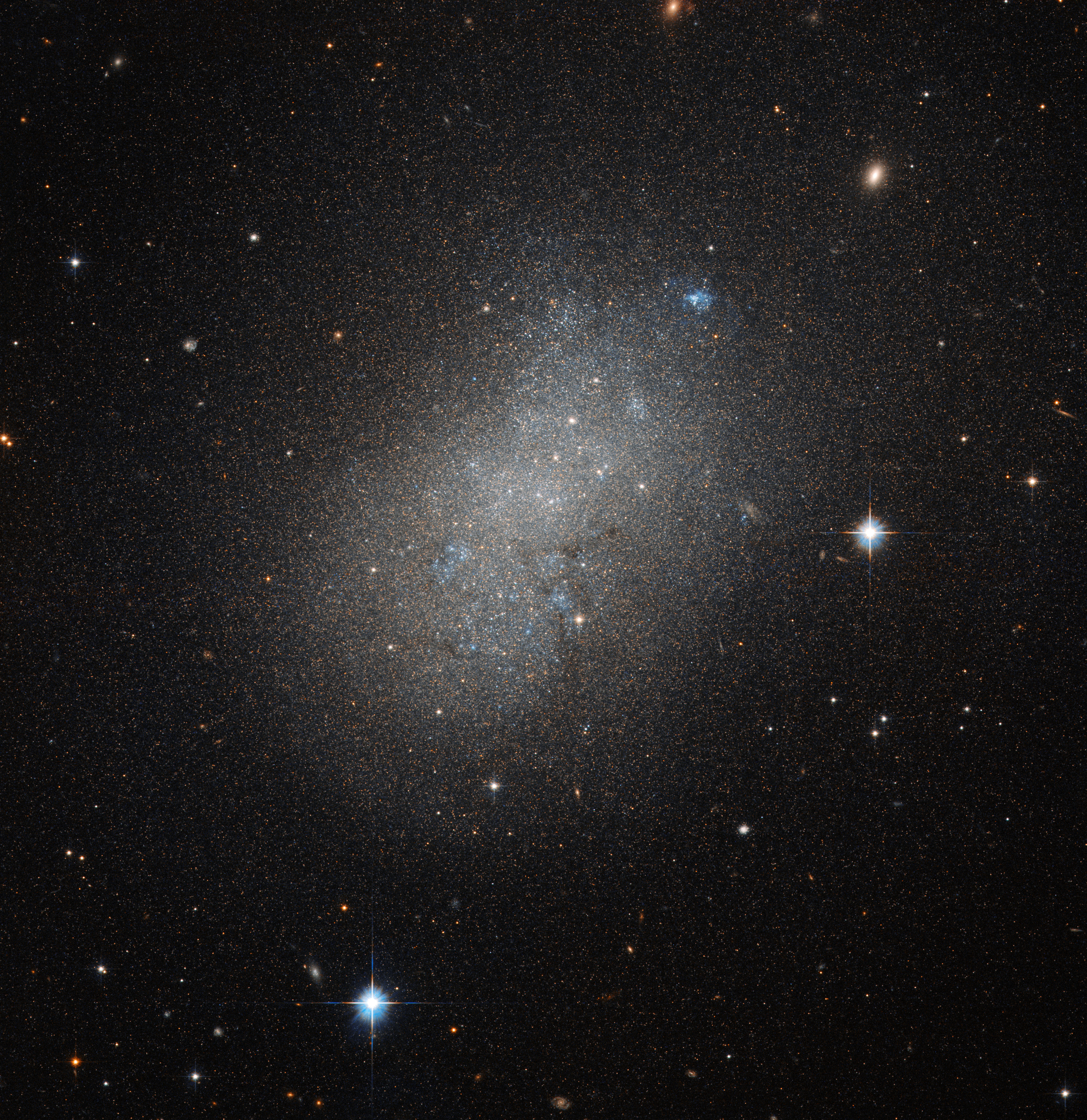
Dwarf galaxies like NGC 5264 typically possess around a billion stars.

One theory states that most galaxies, including dwarf galaxies, form in association with dark matter, or from gas that contains metals. However, NASA's Galaxy Evolution Explorer space probe identified new dwarf galaxies forming out of gases with low metallicity. These galaxies were located in the Leo Ring, a cloud of hydrogen and helium around two massive galaxies in the constellation Leo.

Because of their small size, dwarf galaxies have been observed being pulled toward and ripped by neighbouring spiral galaxies, resulting in stellar streams and eventually galaxy merger. Recent studies, like the Hyper Suprime-Cam Subaru Strategic Program, have shown that around 30–50% of dwarf galaxies that reside in low-density environments are quenched, meaning they have little star formation. This indicates that dwarf galaxy evolution is largely influenced by stellar or active galactic nuclei as well as the environments of nearby massive galaxies.

== Local dwarf galaxies ==
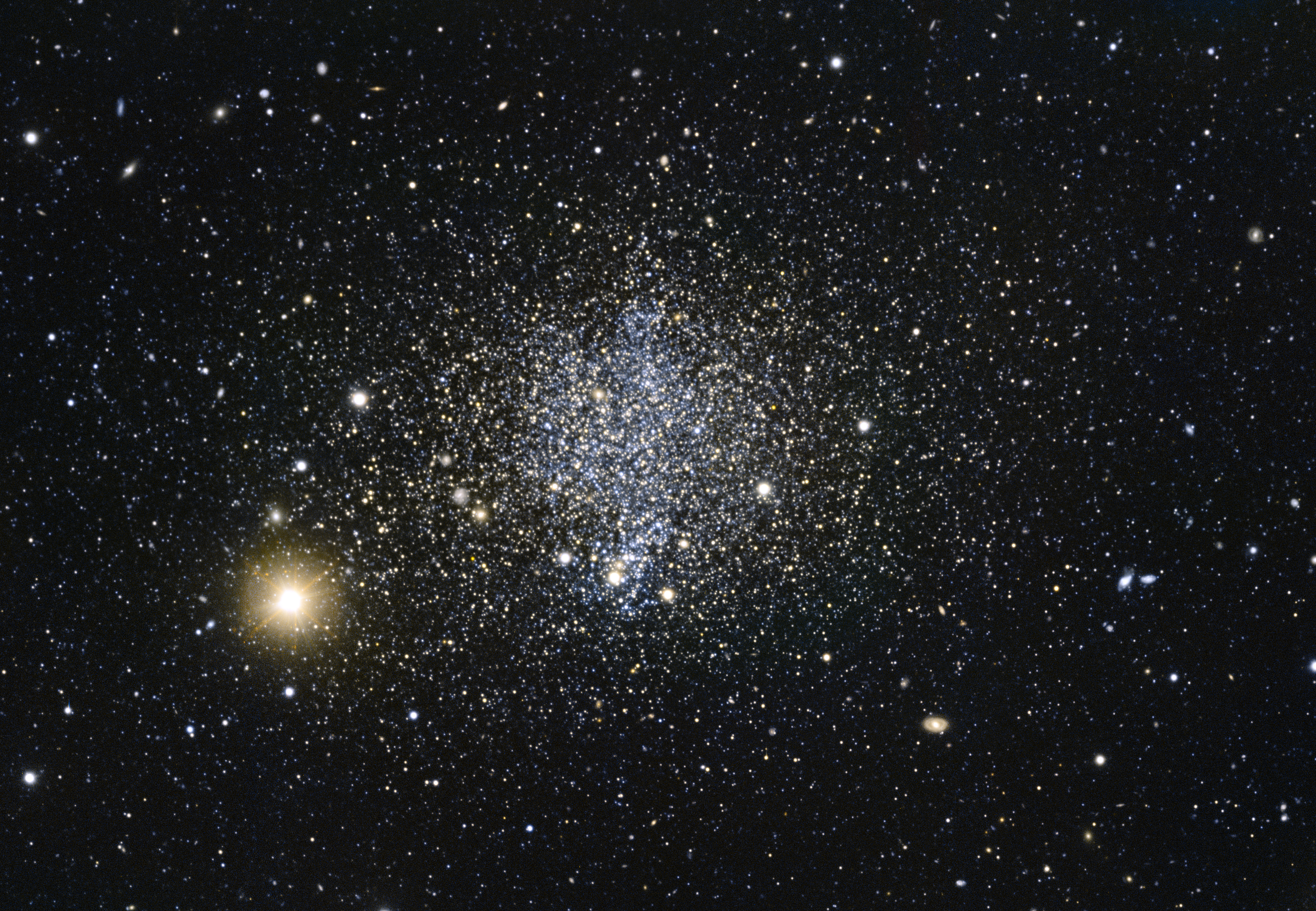
The Phoenix Dwarf Galaxy is a dwarf irregular galaxy, featuring younger stars in its inner regions and older ones at its outskirts.

There are many dwarf galaxies in the Local Group; these small galaxies frequently orbit larger galaxies, such as the Milky Way, the Andromeda Galaxy and the Triangulum Galaxy. A 2007 paper has suggested that many dwarf galaxies were created by galactic tides during the early evolutions of the Milky Way and Andromeda. Tidal dwarf galaxies are produced when galaxies collide and their gravitational masses interact. Streams of galactic material are pulled away from the parent galaxies and the halos of dark matter that surround them. A 2018 study suggests that some local dwarf galaxies formed extremely early, during the Dark Ages within the first billion years after the Big Bang. Additionally, recent studies also show nearby star-forming dwarf galaxies have systems that may have formed most of their stellar mass within the last billion years, indicated by blue colours, high star-formation rates, and low metallicities.

More than 20 known dwarf galaxies orbit the Milky Way, and recent observations have also led astronomers to believe the largest globular cluster in the Milky Way, Omega Centauri, is in fact the core of a dwarf galaxy with a black hole at its centre, which was at some time absorbed by the Milky Way.

Measurements of the motions of individual stars from local dwarf galaxies, such as the Sculptor Dwarf Galaxy, have allowed scientists to test predictions of the standard cosmological model. Detailed studies of local dwarf galaxies also provide insight into how environmental effects like ram pressure stripping shape the evolution and formation of galaxies.

== Common types ==
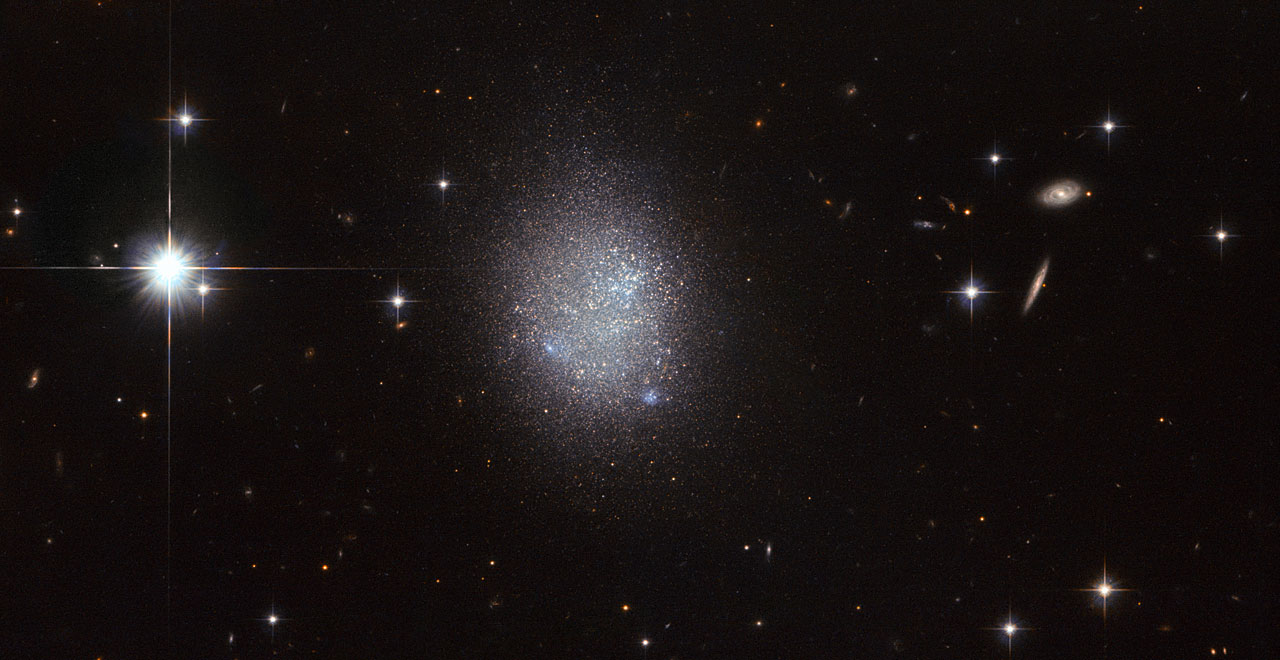
UGC 11411 is a galaxy known as an irregular blue compact dwarf (BCD) galaxy.

- Elliptical galaxy: dwarf elliptical galaxy (dE)
- Dwarf spheroidal galaxy (dSph): Once a subtype of dwarf ellipticals, now regarded as a distinct type
- Irregular galaxy: dwarf irregular galaxy (dIrr)
- Spiral galaxy: dwarf spiral galaxy (dS)
- Magellanic type dwarfs
- Blue compact dwarf galaxies (see section below)
- Ultra-compact dwarf galaxies (see section below)

== Blue compact dwarf galaxies ==
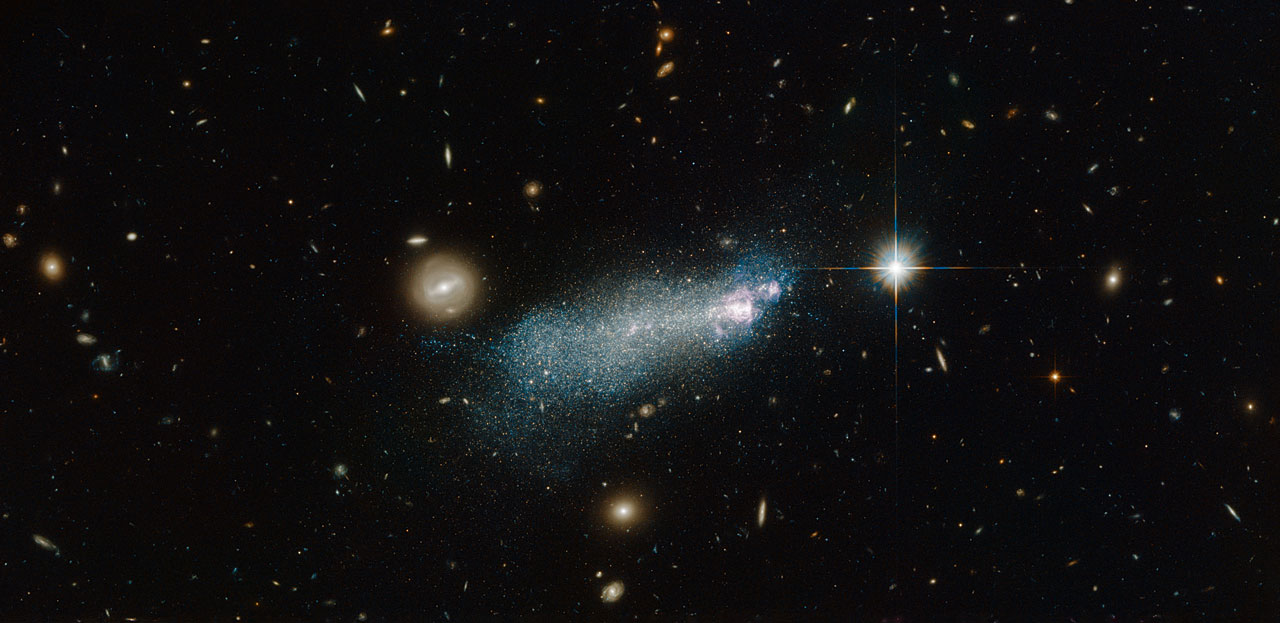
Blue compact dwarf PGC 51017.

In astronomy, a blue compact dwarf galaxy (BCD galaxy) is a small galaxy which contains large clusters of young, hot, massive stars. These stars, the brightest of which are blue, cause the galaxy itself to appear blue in colour. Most BCD galaxies are also classified as dwarf irregular galaxies or as dwarf lenticular galaxies. Because they are composed of star clusters, BCD galaxies lack a uniform shape. They consume gas intensely, which causes their stars to become very violent when forming.

BCD galaxies cool in the process of forming new stars. The galaxies' stars are all formed at different time periods, so the galaxies have time to cool and to build up matter to form new stars. As time passes, this star formation changes the shape of the galaxies.

Nearby examples include NGC 1705, NGC 2915, NGC 3353, UGC 6541, and UGCA 281.

== Ultra-faint dwarf galaxies ==
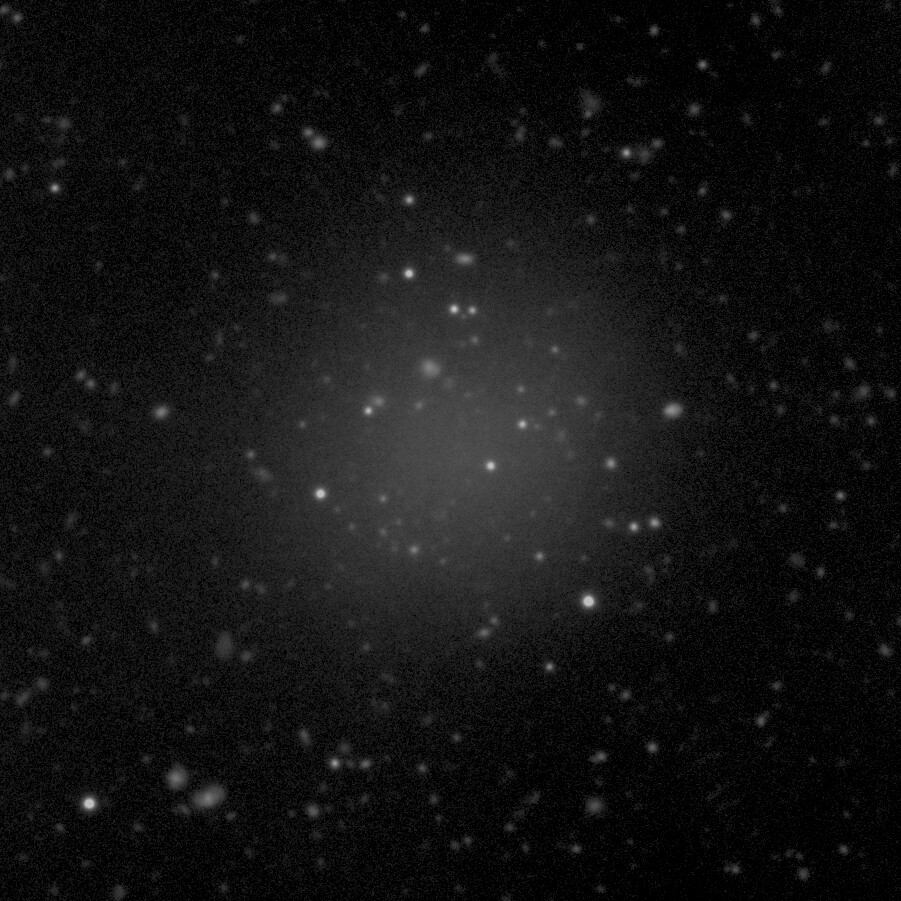
A composite color image by the Hubble Space Telescope of the NGC 1052-DF2

Ultra-faint dwarf galaxies (UFDs) are a class of galaxies that contain from a few hundred to one hundred thousand stars, making them the faintest galaxies in the Universe. UFDs resemble globular clusters (GCs) in appearance but have very different properties. Unlike GCs, UFDs contain a significant amount of dark matter and are more extended. UFDs were first discovered with the advent of digital sky surveys in 2005, in particular with the Sloan Digital Sky Survey (SDSS).

UFDs are the most dark matter-dominated systems known. Astronomers believe that UFDs encode valuable information about the early Universe, as all UFDs discovered so far are ancient systems that have likely formed very early on, only a few million years after the Big Bang and before the epoch of reionization. Recent theoretical work has hypothesised the existence of a population of young UFDs that form at a much later time than the ancient UFDs. These galaxies have not been observed in our Universe so far.

== Ultra-compact dwarfs ==
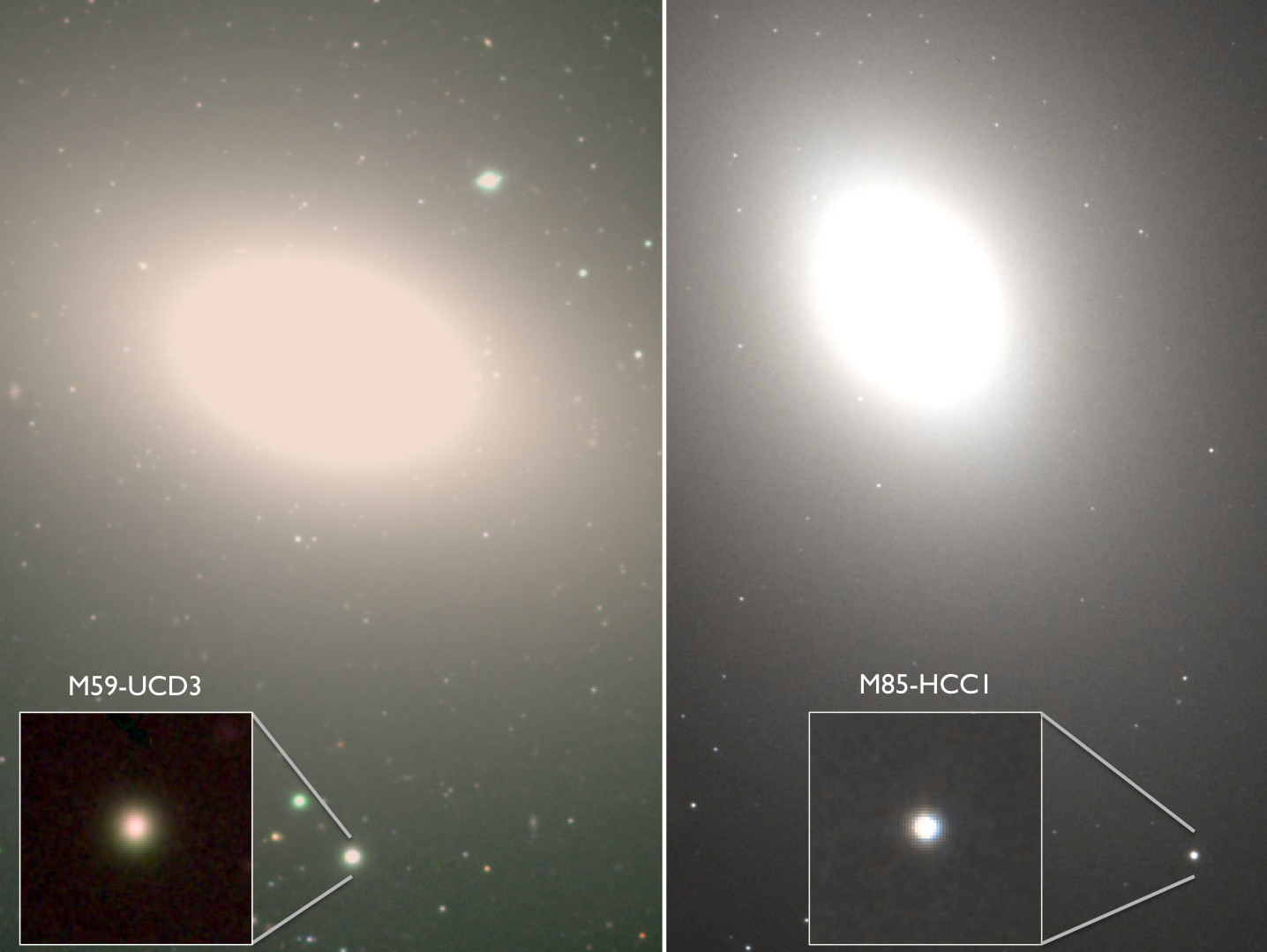
M59-UCD3 and M85-HCCI are the densest galaxies discovered.

Ultra-compact dwarf galaxies (UCD) are a class of very compact galaxies with very high stellar densities, discovered in the 2000s. They are thought to be on the order of 200 light years across, containing about 100 million stars. There are two principal theorized formation channels for these galaxies. The first is that these are the cores of nucleated dwarf elliptical galaxies that have been stripped of gas and outlying stars by tidal interactions, traveling through the hearts of rich clusters. This "tidal threshing" origin is quantitatively supported by the scaling between the central black hole masses of UCDs and the masses of their inner stellar components (the suspected nuclear star clusters), which follows the black hole–nuclear star cluster mass relationship observed in unstripped galaxies. The second theory is that these are massive star clusters. UCDs have been found in the Virgo Cluster, Fornax Cluster, Abell 1689, and the Coma Cluster, amongst others. In particular, an unprecedentedly large sample of ~ 100 UCDs has been found in the core region of the Virgo cluster by the Next Generation Virgo Cluster Survey team. The first ever relatively robust studies of the global properties of Virgo UCDs suggest that UCDs have distinct dynamical and structural properties from normal globular clusters. An extreme example of UCD is M60-UCD1, about 54 million light years away, which contains approximately 200 million solar masses within a 160 light year radius; the stars in its central region are packed 25 times more densely than stars in Earth's region in the Milky Way. M59-UCD3 is approximately the same size as M60-UCD1 with a half-light radius, r_{h}, of approximately 20 parsecs but is 40% more luminous with an absolute visual magnitude of approximately −14.6. This makes M59-UCD3 the second densest known galaxy. Based on stellar orbital velocities, several UCD in the Virgo Cluster are claimed to have supermassive black holes at their centers, with masses comprising $\gtrsim$ 10% of their stellar mass.

== Partial list ==
- Aquarius Dwarf
- Canis Major Dwarf Galaxy
- Carina Dwarf
- Crater 2 dwarf
- Draco Dwarf
- Eridanus II
- Fornax Dwarf
- Henize 2-10
- I Zwicky 18
- IC 10
- Large Magellanic Cloud
- Leo I
- Leo II
- NGC 1569
- NGC 1705
- NGC 2915
- NGC 3353
- Pegasus Dwarf Irregular Galaxy
- PHL 293B
- Phoenix Dwarf
- Sagittarius Dwarf Spheroidal Galaxy
- Sagittarius Dwarf Irregular Galaxy
- Sculptor Dwarf Galaxy
- Sculptor Dwarf Irregular Galaxy
- Sextans A
- Sextans Dwarf Spheroidal
- Small Magellanic Cloud
- Tucana Dwarf
- Ursa Major I Dwarf
- Ursa Major II Dwarf
- Ursa Minor Dwarf
- Willman 1

== Gallery ==
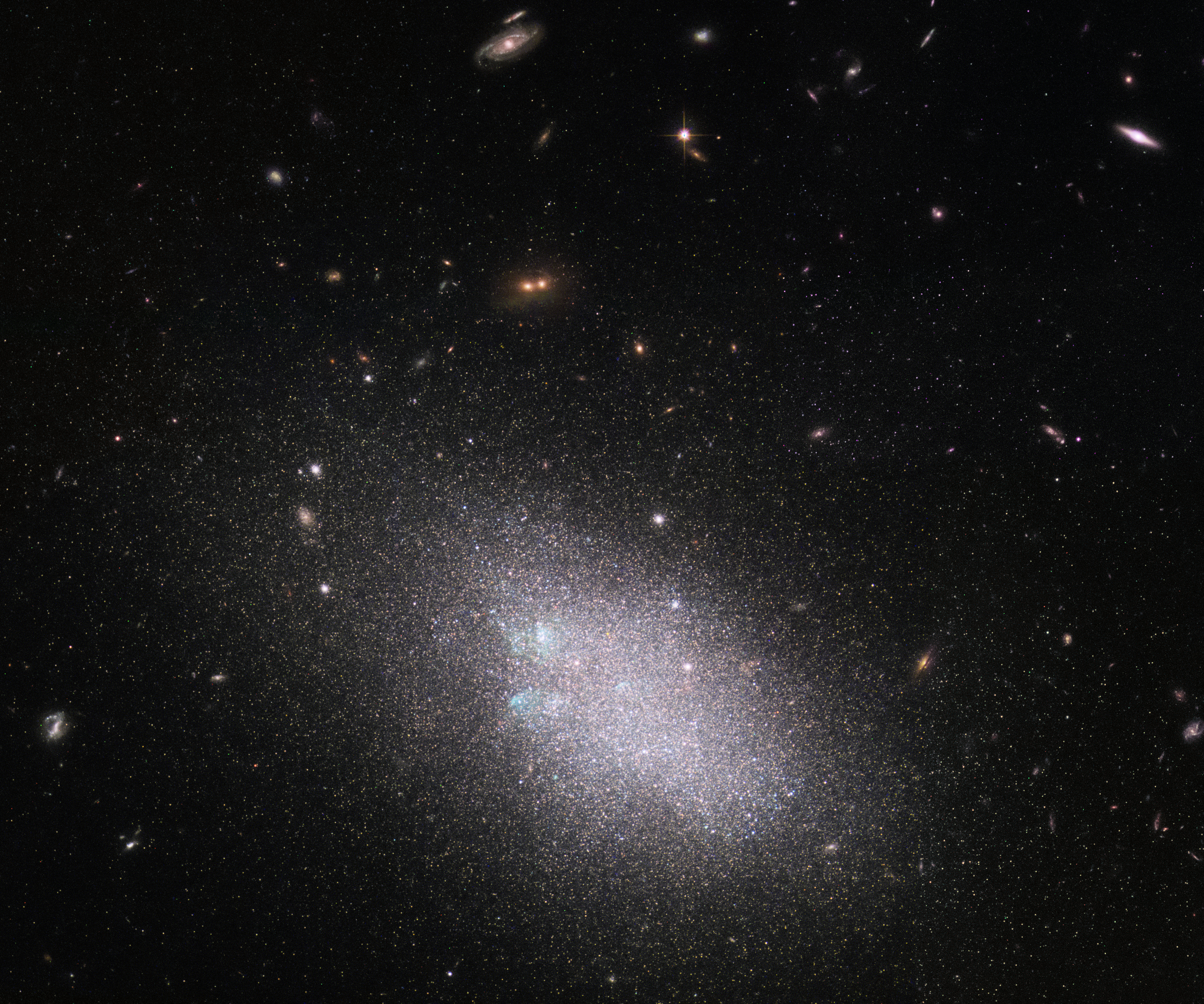
Dwarf galaxy UGC 685 taken by Hubble.

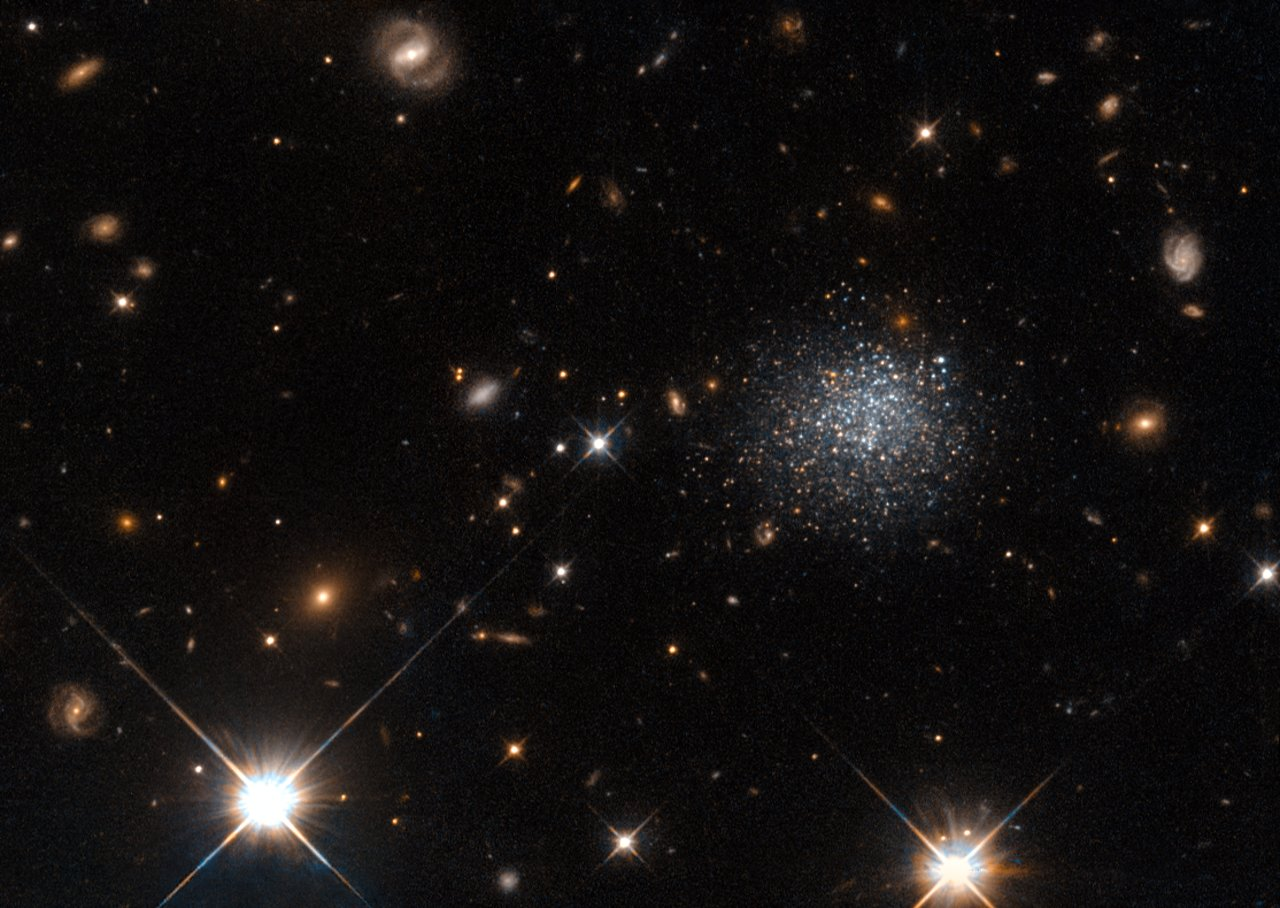
LEDA 677373 is located about 14 million light-years away.

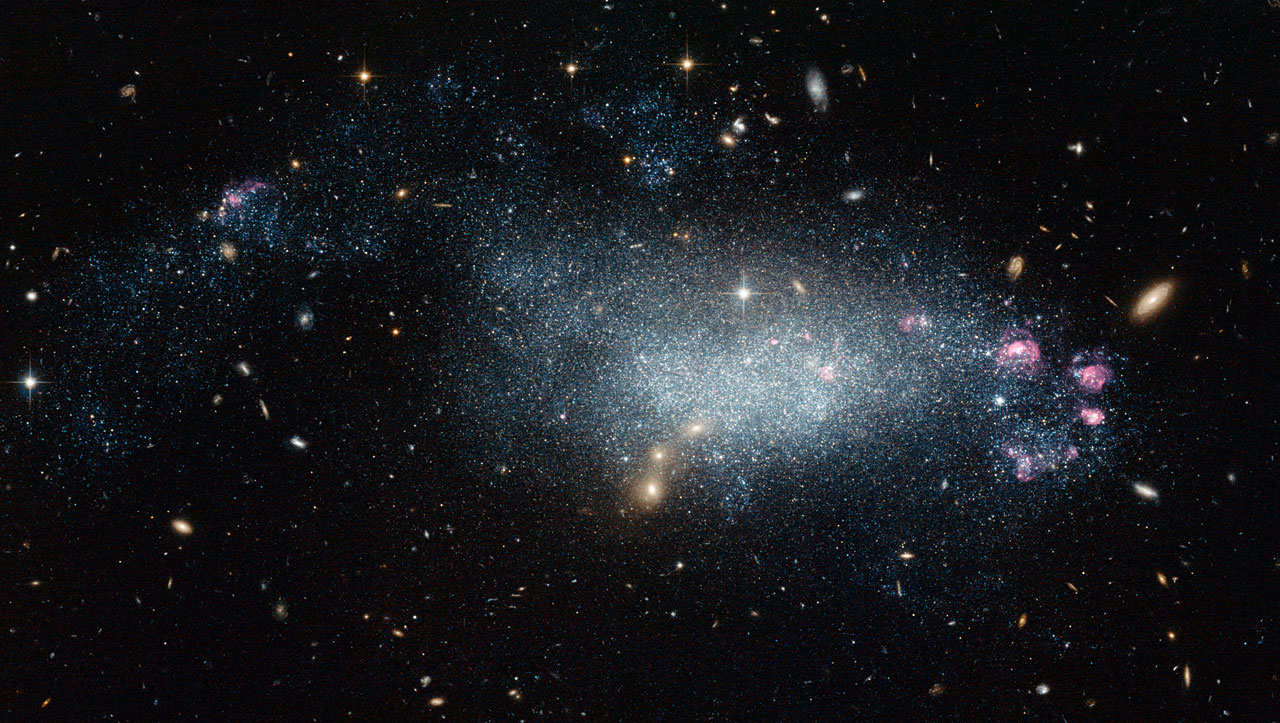
Dwarf galaxy DDO 68.

== See also ==
- Blueberry galaxy – Small and very active galaxies.
- Galaxy morphological classification – System for categorizing galaxies based on appearance
- List of nearest galaxies – Galaxies within 3.8 megaparsecs of the Solar System
- Pea galaxy – Possible type of luminous blue compact galaxy
