= NGC 2915 =

Galaxy in the constellation Chamaeleon

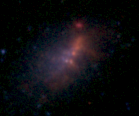
- NGC 2915 as observed with the Spitzer Space Telescope (SST) as part of the SINGS Survey. The blue colors represent the 3.6 micrometre emission from stars. The green and red colors represent the 5.8 and 8.0 micrometre emission from polycyclic aromatic hydrocarbons

Observation data (J2000 epoch)
- Constellation: Chamaeleon
- Right ascension: 09^{h} 26^{m} 11.5^{s}
- Declination: −76° 37′ 35″
- Redshift: 468 ± 3 km/s
- Distance: 12.3 Mly (3.78 Mpc)
- Apparent magnitude (V): 13.3

Characteristics
- Type: I0
- Apparent size (V): 1.9′ × 1.0′

Other designations
- PGC 26761

NGC 2915 is a blue dwarf galaxy located 12 million light-years away in the southern constellation Chamaeleon, right on the edge of the Local Group. The optical galaxy corresponds to the core of a much larger spiral galaxy traced by radio observation of neutral hydrogen.

The galaxy has a short central bar, much like the Milky Way and very extended spiral arms. The central disk appears to be rotating in the opposite direction to the extended spiral arms.

The reason for the spiral arms and majority of the galaxy's disk to be still neutral hydrogen (as opposed to have formed stars) is not well understood but is thought to be related to the galaxy's isolation, in that it has no nearby satellite galaxies and no nearby major galaxies to force star formation.
