= Draco Dwarf =

Spheroidal galaxy in the constellation Draco

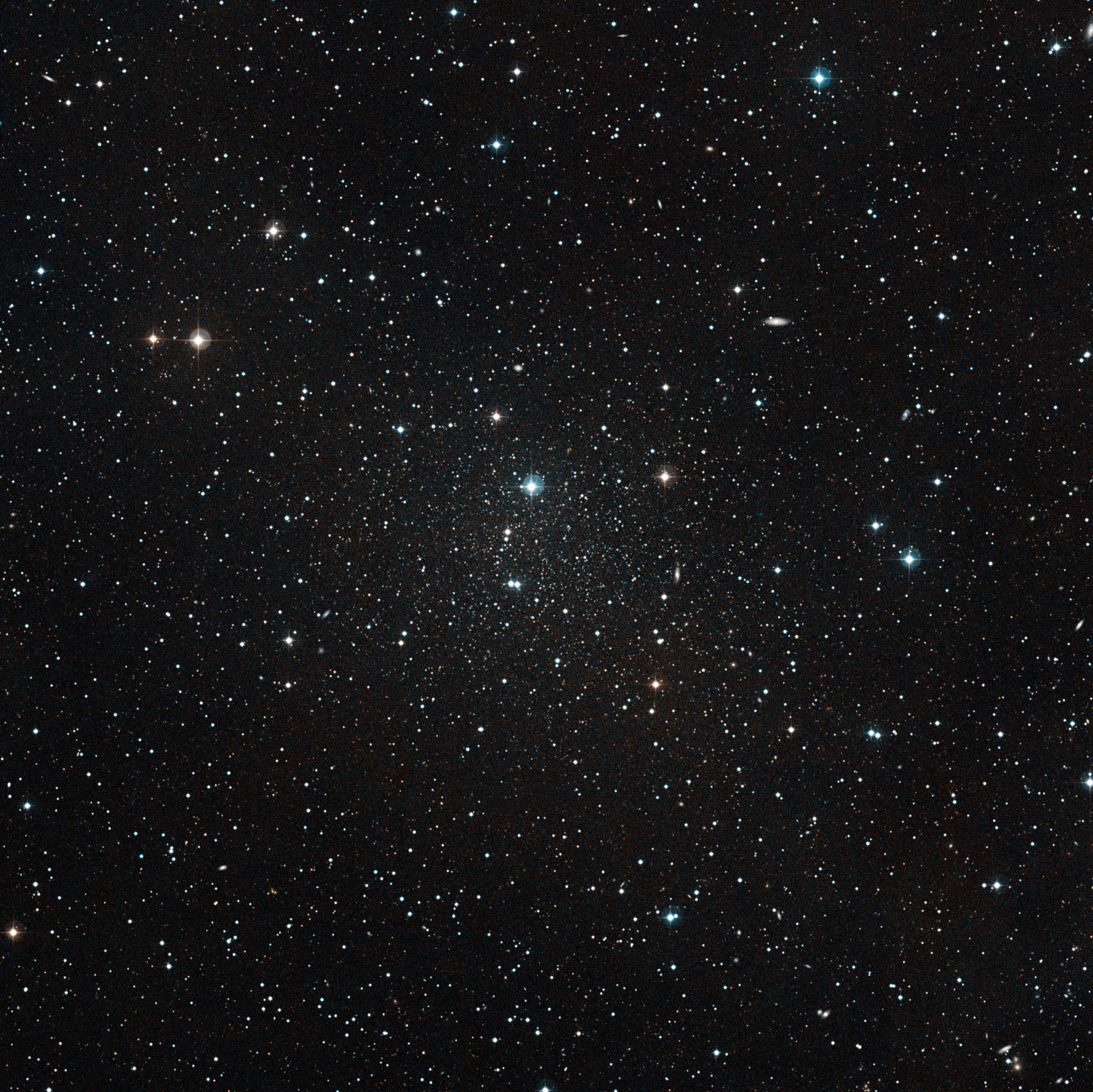
- Field image of the Draco dwarf spheroidal galaxy, by the Digitized Sky Survey

Observation data (J2000 epoch)
- Constellation: Draco
- Right ascension: 17^{h} 20^{m} 12.4^{s}
- Declination: +57° 54′ 55″
- Redshift: −292 ± 21 km/s
- Distance: 260 ± 30 kly (75.4 kpc)
- Apparent magnitude (V): 10.9

Characteristics
- Type: E pec
- Mass: 1.2×10^{8}^{[e]} M_{☉}
- Apparent size (V): 35.5′ × 24.5′
- Notable features: Highest known dark matter concentrated object

Other designations
- Draco Dwarf Spheroidal, Draco dSph, UGC 10822, PGC 60095, DDO 208,

The Draco Dwarf is a spheroidal galaxy which was discovered by Albert George Wilson of Lowell Observatory in 1954 on photographic plates of the National Geographic Society's Palomar Observatory Sky Survey (POSS). It is part of the Local Group and a satellite galaxy of the Milky Way galaxy. The Draco Dwarf is situated in the constellation Draco at 34.6° above the galactic plane.

== Characteristics ==
Paul W. Hodge analyzed the distribution of its stars in 1964 and concluded that its ellipticity was 0.29 ± 0.04. Recent studies have indicated that the galaxy may potentially hold large amounts of dark matter. Having an absolute magnitude of −8.6^{[c]} and a total luminosity of only 2×10^{5} L_{☉}, it is one of the faintest companions to our Milky Way.

Draco Dwarf contains many red giant branch (RGB) stars; five carbon stars have been identified in Draco Dwarf and four likely asymptotic giant branch (AGB) stars have been detected. In 1961, Walter Baade and Henrietta H. Swope studied Draco Dwarf and discovered over 260 variables. Of the 138 in the cluster's center, all but five were determined to be RR Lyrae variables. From this work a RR Lyrae derived distance modulus of 19.55^{[a]} is found which implies a distance of 81 kpc.^{[b]} The modern estimate is 80 ± 10 kpc from Earth and its size is around 830 ± 100 × 570 ± 70 pc.^{[d]}

== Metallicity ==
The Draco Dwarf contains primarily an old population of stars and insignificant amounts of interstellar matter (being basically dust free). From 75% to 90% of its stars formed more than ~10 Gyr ago followed by a low rate of formation with a small burst of star formation around 2–3 Gyr ago. It has a single Gaussian distribution with average metallicity of [Fe/H] = −1.74 dex with a standard deviation (sigma/σ) of 0.24 dex and a small tail of metal-rich stars. The central region of Draco Dwarf exhibits a concentration of more metal-rich stars there being more centrally concentrated red horizontal branch stars than blue horizontal branch stars.

== Dark matter ==
Recently, dwarf spheroidal galaxies have become key objects for the study of dark matter. The Draco Dwarf is one which has received specific attention. Radial velocity measurements of individual stars in Draco have revealed a large internal velocity dispersion giving a mass to luminosity ratio of up to 440 M_{☉}/L_{☉}, suggesting large amounts of dark matter. It has been hypothesized that large velocity dispersions could be explained as tidal dwarfs (virtually unbound stellar streams from dwarf galaxies tidally disrupted in the Milky Way potential). However, Draco Dwarf's narrow horizontal branch width does not support this model. This only leaves the dark matter explanation and makes Draco Dwarf the most dark matter dominated object known as of 2007. The dark matter distribution within Draco Dwarf is at least nearly isothermal.

At large radii, radial velocity dispersion exhibit strange behavior. One possible explanation for this would be the presence of more than one stellar population. This suggests the need for further study of Draco Dwarf population's metallicity and ages and of dwarf spheroidals in general.

In 2024, a group of scientists using the Hubble Space Telescope measured proper motions of Draco with 18 years of data, making it the first dwarf galaxy to have its 3D velocity dispersion profile radially resolved. The group of astronomers showed that Draco's dark matter distribution is in better agreement with the LCDM model, helping to alleviate the cusp-core problem.

== Notes ==
1. Assuming an absolute magnitude of +0.5 V for RR Lyrae the apparent modulus of the Draco Dwarf is 19.58 m−M. Using a reddening value towards Draco Dwarf of 0.03 ± 0.01 we get a true distance modulus of 19.55.
2. Using the distance modulus formula of 1×10^{(0.2 * 19.55 + 1)} we get an RR Lyrae estimated distance of 81 kpc.
3. Apparent Magnitude of 10.9 – distance modulus of 19.52 (80 kpc) = −8.6
4. distance 80 ± 10 kpc × tan(diameter_angle = 35.5′ × 24.5′) = 830 ± 100 × 570 ± 70 pc diameter
5. The quoted total mass is the cumulative dark matter mass (much higher than the luminous mass) at 900 pc from the galaxy's center.
