= Leo V =

Leo V or Leon V may refer to:

- Leo V the Armenian (813–820), Byzantine emperor
- Pope Leo V, pope in 903
- Leo V, King of Armenia (1342–1393), of the House of Lusignan; last Latin king of the Armenian Kingdom of Cilicia
- Leo V (dwarf galaxy), a dwarf satellite galaxy of the Milky Way
