= Leo IV =

Leon IV or Leo IV may refer to:

- Leo IV the Khazar (750 – 780), Byzantine Emperor
- Pope Leo IV, pope from 847 – 855
- Leo IV of Armenia (1309 – 1341), last Hethumid king of Cilicia
- Leo IV (dwarf galaxy), a dwarf satellite galaxy of the Milky Way
