= Aquarius IV =

Dwarf galaxy in constellation Aquarius

- A Rubin image centered on Aquarius IV, combining images in the g, r, and z filters. The yellow star marks a likely blue horizontal branch member.

Observation data (J2000 epoch)
- Constellation: Aquarius
- Right ascension: 22^{h} 01^{m} 53.76^{s}
- Declination: −02° 34′ 30.0″
- Distance: 109 kpc (0.36 Mly)
- Absolute magnitude (V): −1.9+0.6 −1.0

Characteristics
- Type: dSph
- Half-light radius (physical): 62+13 −20 ly (19+4 −6 pc)
- Half-light radius (apparent): 0.60′+0.14′ −0.17′
- Notable features: satellite galaxy of Milky Way

Other designations
- Rubin J2201−0234

Aquarius IV (also known as Rubin J2201−0234) is an ultra-faint dwarf spheroidal galaxy located in the outer halo of the Milky Way in the constellation of Aquarius, at a distance of 109 kiloparsecs from the Sun. It is the first cosmic object discovered using the preliminary data from the Vera C. Rubin Observatory in Chile.

== Discovery ==
The galaxy was first identified by an international research team led by astronomer William Cherny, utilizing photometric data from the Early Data Preview 2 (EDP2) release of the Vera C. Rubin Observatory. The researchers detected a localized overdensity of stars within the Milky Way’s stellar halo, with the initial discovery reaching a statistical significance of approximately 8σ.

To verify the structure, the team conducted a follow-up analysis using archival deep-field imaging from the Dark Energy Camera (DECam), mounted on the 4-meter Víctor M. Blanco Telescope at the Cerro Tololo Inter-American Observatory. This reanalysis confirmed the stellar overdensity with a significance of 6σ. The object had remained uncatalogued until now due to the extremely low luminosity of its constituent stars. Furthermore, the distribution of stars on a color-magnitude diagram revealed a clear alignment with a single theoretical isochrone, confirming the system is gravitationally bound.

A preprint of the scientific paper detailing these findings was published on arXiv on August 3, 2026.

== Physical characteristics ==
Aquarius IV is classified as an ultra-faint dwarf spheroidal galaxy with an effective half-light radius of only 19+4
−6 parsecs (approximately 62+13
−20 light-years) and an angular half-light radius of 0.60+0.14
−0.17 arcminutes. The upper limit of the galaxy's ellipticity is ϵ < 0.61 with 95% confidence. The system's absolute magnitude in the visible band is −1.9+0.6
−1.0, classifying it as an object of extremely low luminosity. The total luminous flux of the galaxy is provided by only a small, sparse number of individual faint stars.

The distribution of stars on the color-magnitude diagramis consistent with an ancient isochrone with an extremely low metallicity of Z = 0.0001. The age of the stellar population is estimated to be approximately 13 billion years, placing its formation in the early stages of the Universe's evolution. Photometric analysis identified a probable blue horizontal branch star at a distance of 0.8 arcminutes from the center of the system, which confirms the ancient nature of the stellar population.

== See also ==
- Satellite galaxies of the Milky Way
- Dwarf spheroidal galaxy (dSph)
- Milky Way
