= LEDA 677373 =

Gas-stripped dwarf galaxy

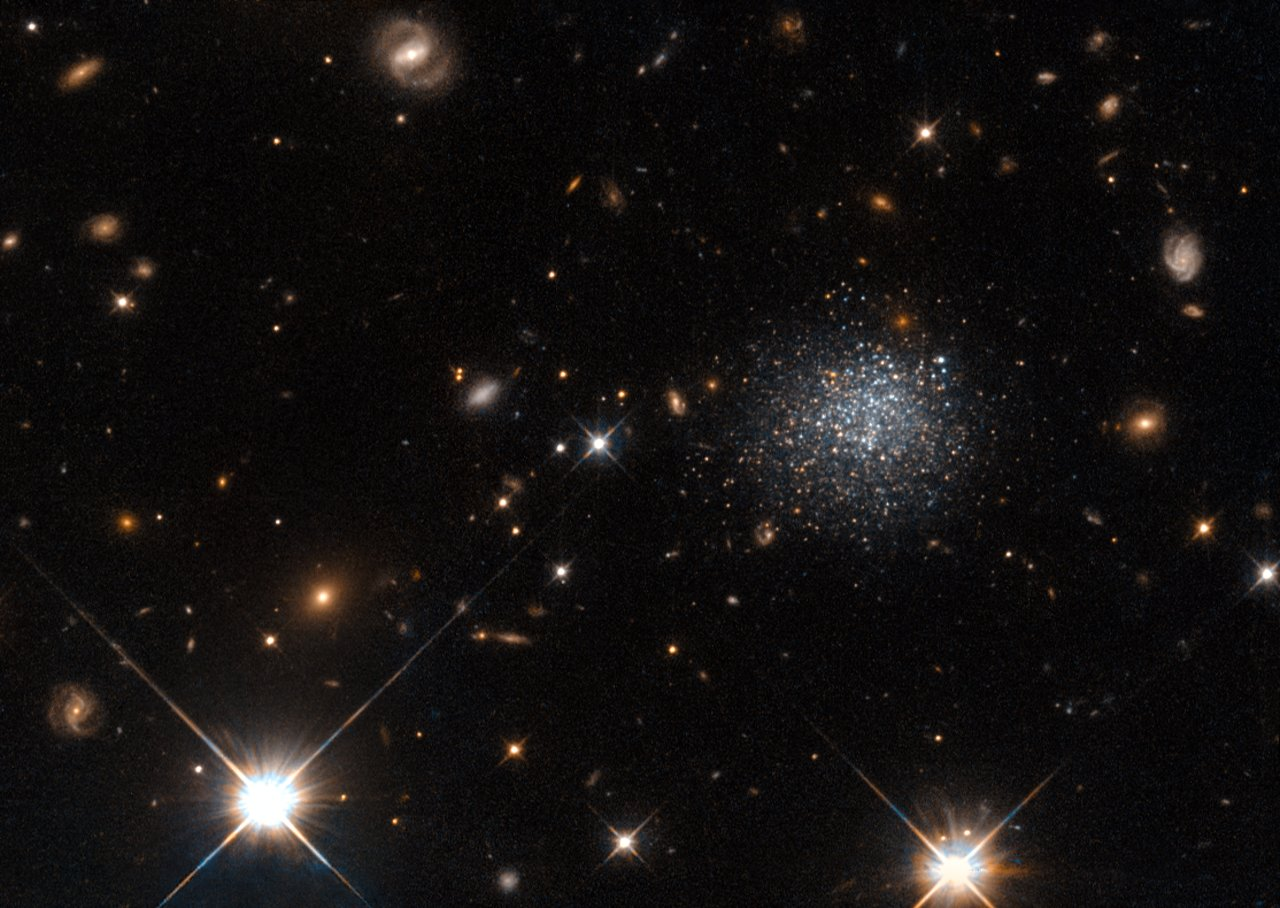
- The LEDA 677373 galaxy

Observation data
- Constellation: Centaurus
- Right ascension: 13^{h} 37^{m} 1.90^{s}
- Declination: −33° 21′ 34.43″
- Distance: 14 million
- Notable features: Gas is being stripped from this galaxy stopping star formation.

LEDA 677373 is a faint dwarf galaxy located about 14 million light years from Earth in the Centaurus A/M83 Group in the constellation of Centaurus.

It has a large reserve of gas which could potentially form new stars. However, this galaxy is unable to form new stars due to Messier 83 gravitationally pulling gas form LEDA 677373.
