= NGC 1705 =

Galaxy in the constellation Pictor

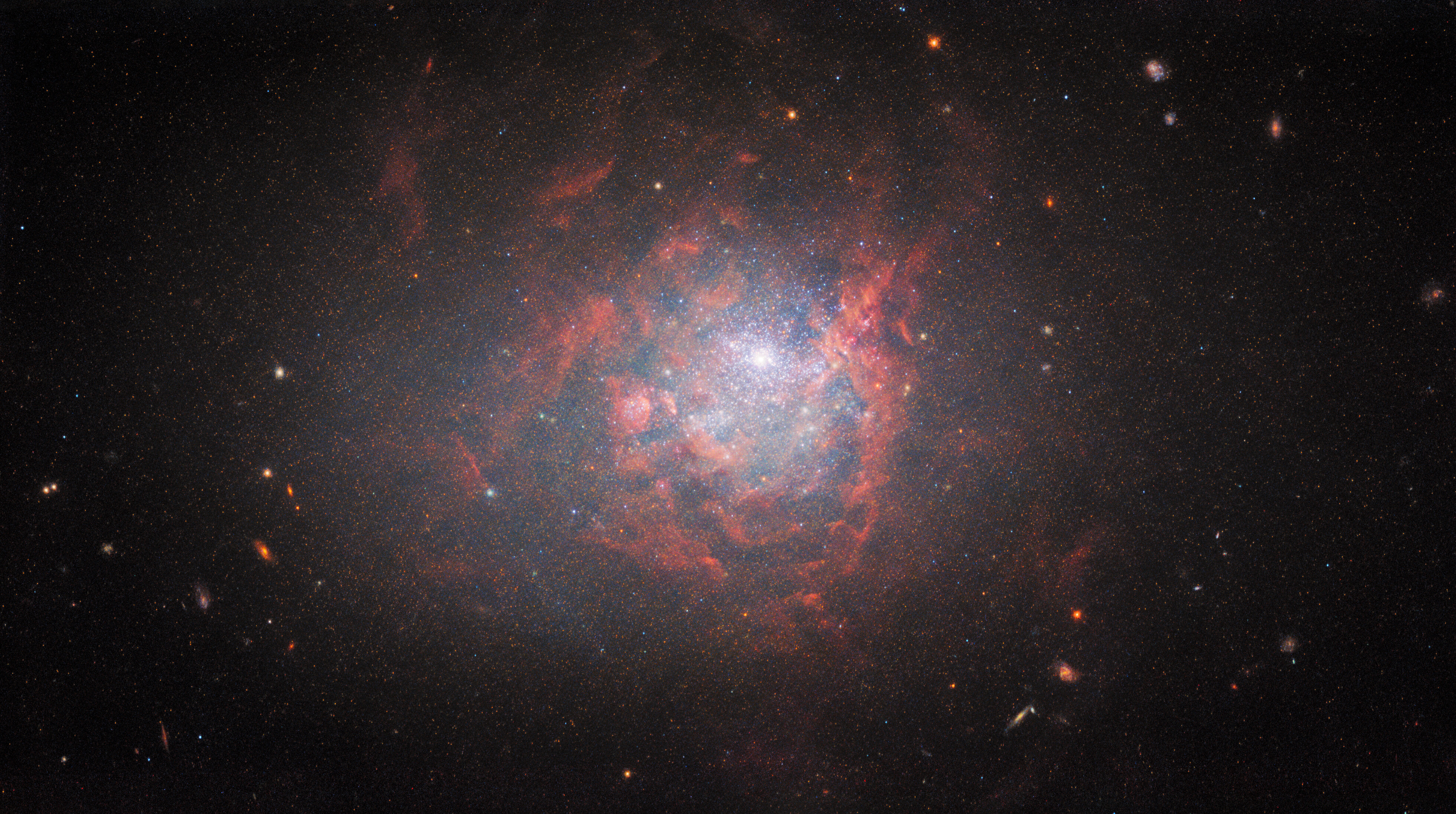
- NGC 1705. Credit: NASA.

Observation data (J2000 epoch)
- Constellation: Pictor
- Right ascension: 04^{h} 54^{m} 13.500^{s}
- Declination: −53° 21′ 39.82″
- Redshift: 633 ± 6 km/s
- Distance: 16.6 ± 2.0 Mly (5.1 ± 0.6 Mpc)
- Group or cluster: Dorado Group
- Apparent magnitude (V): 12.56±0.03

Characteristics
- Type: SA0^{−} pec or BCD
- Apparent size (V): 1′.86 × 1′.45

Other designations
- PGC 16282

NGC 1705 is a peculiar lenticular galaxy and a blue compact dwarf galaxy (BCD) in the southern constellation of Pictor, positioned less than a degree to the east of Iota Pictoris, and is undergoing a starburst. With an apparent visual magnitude of 12.6 it requires a telescope to observe. It is estimated to be approximately 17 million light-years from the Earth, and is a member of the Dorado Group.

This is a relatively isolated galaxy, with its nearest neighbors being more than 500 kpc distant. However, its neutral hydrogen disk shows a significant amount of warp, suggesting that the outer gas is still settling into place. The mass models of the galaxy suggest the dominant source of mass is a dark matter halo. It has a super star cluster located near the galactic center, and shows strong galactic winds. Designated NGC1750–1, this cluster has a maximum radius of 2.85±0.50 pc and is 12±6 Myr old.

The major starburst activity is happening at the core of the galaxy, within the central ~150 pc, and this is providing the main ionizing source out to distance of ~1 kpc or more. Over the last 10 million years it has added 5.7×10^{5} M_{☉} worth of stars. The younger stars in the galaxy with an age below a billion years have an estimated 6×10^{7} M_{☉} and are mainly concentrated near the center, while the older star populations have 2.2×10^{8} M_{☉} and form a more extended distribution. The total mass of neutral hydrogen in the galaxy is estimated at (2.2±0.2)×10^{8} M_{☉}.
