= M59-UCD3 =

Ultra-compact dwarf galaxy in the constellation of Virgo

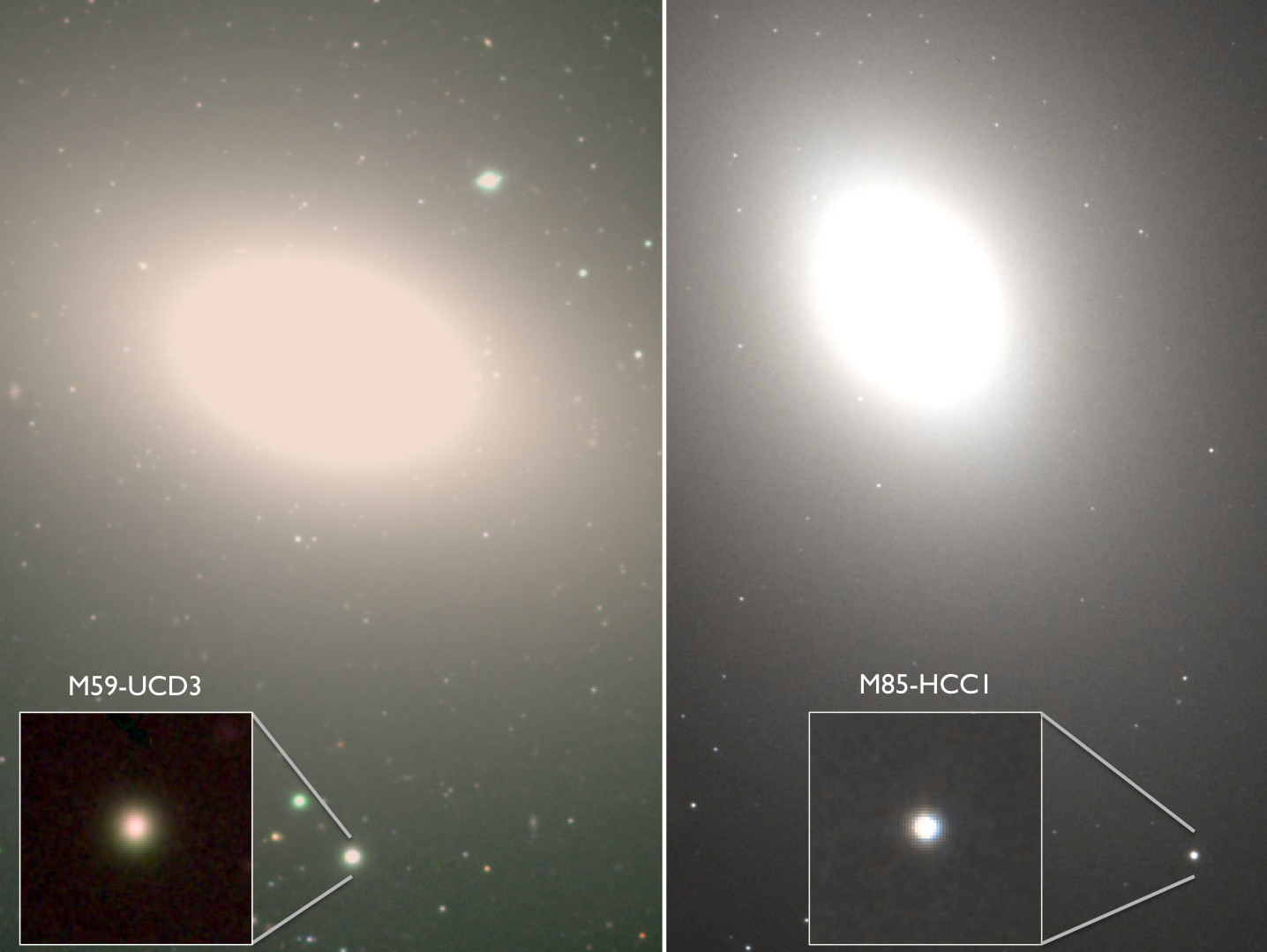
- Images of two ultracompact dwarf galaxies. M59-UCD3 is in the inset to the left, while M85-HCC1 is in the inset to the right.

Observation data (J2000 epoch)
- Constellation: Virgo
- Right ascension: 12^{h} 42^{m} 11.041^{s}
- Declination: +11° 38′ 41.21″
- Heliocentric radial velocity: 373 ± 18
- Apparent magnitude (V): 16.34 ± 0.05
- Absolute magnitude (V): −14.60 ± 0.09

Characteristics
- Mass: (1.8±0.3)×10^{8} M_{☉}
- Half-light radius (physical): 20 ± 4 pc

Other designations
- SDSS J124211.04+113841.2

M59-UCD3 is an ultra-compact dwarf galaxy located near the Messier 59 galaxy. As of 2015, it is the second-densest galaxy currently observed, second to M85-HCC1.

== See also ==
- M60-UCD1 (densest galaxy known, as of 2013)
- M85-HCC1 (densest galaxy known, as of 2015)
