= Ursa Minor Dwarf =

Dwarf spheroidal galaxy

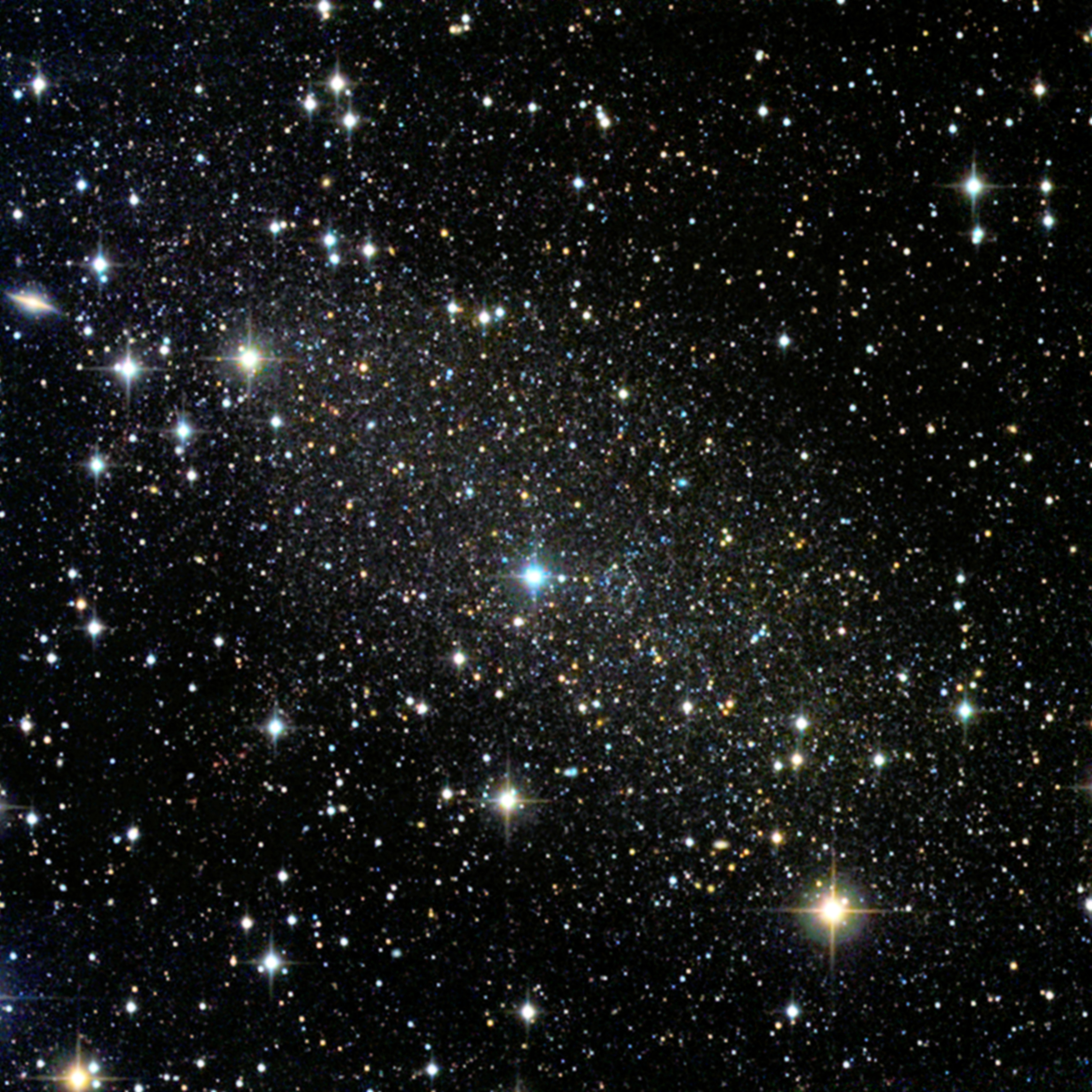
- Ursa Minor Dwarf

Observation data (J2000 epoch)
- Constellation: Ursa Minor
- Right ascension: 15^{h} 09^{m} 08.5^{s}
- Declination: +67° 13′ 21″
- Redshift: −247±1 km/s
- Distance: 200 ± 30 kly (60 ± 10 kpc)
- Apparent magnitude (V): 11.9

Characteristics
- Type: E
- Apparent size (V): 30′.2 × 19′.1
- Notable features: Satellite galaxy of Milky Way

Other designations
- UGC 9749, PGC 54074, DDO 199, UMi Dwarf

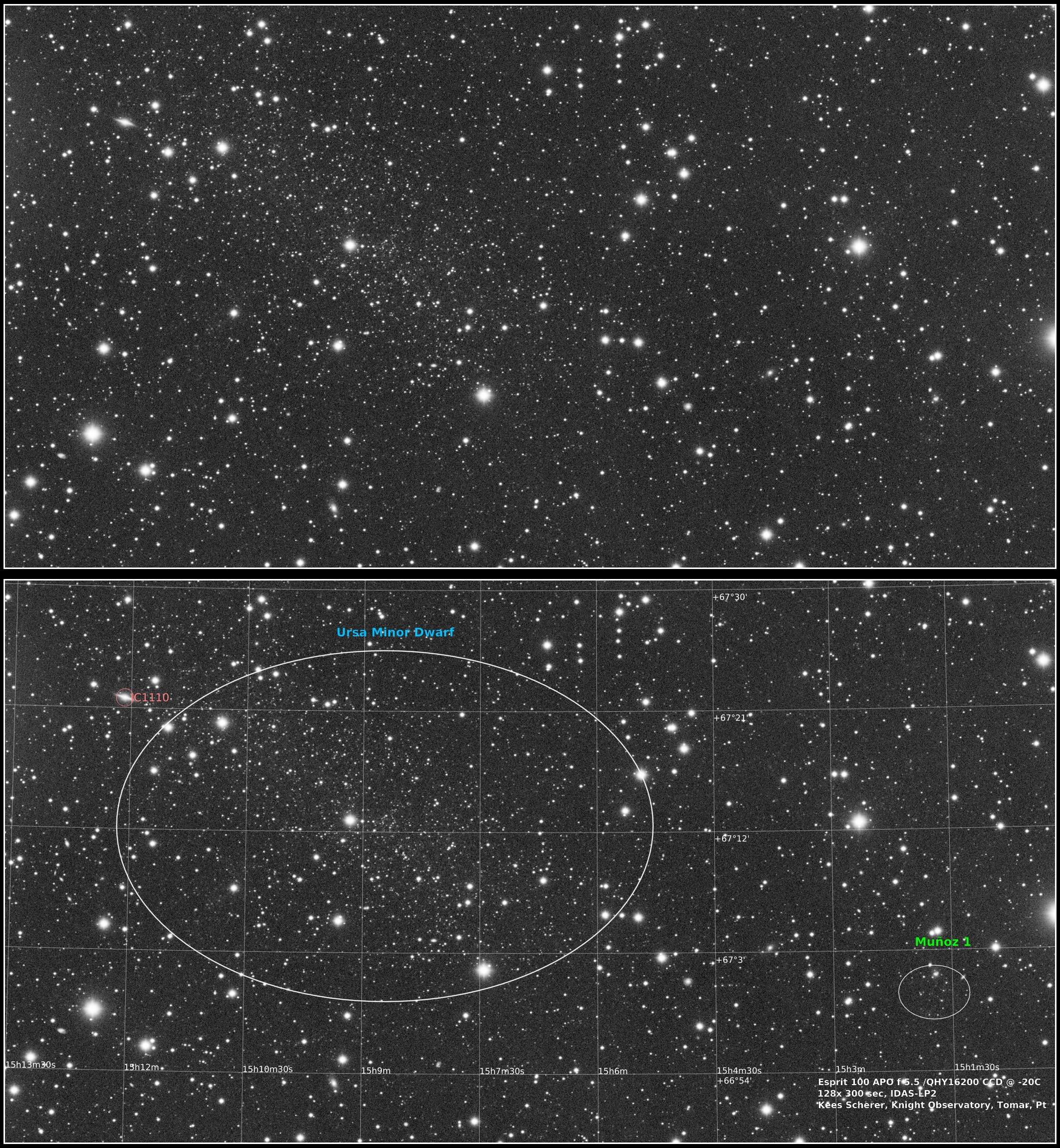
Amateur image, 10.7 hr. exposure with Esprit 100 APO Refractor+QHY16200CCD @-20C/ IDAS LP2 filter

The Ursa Minor Dwarf is a dwarf spheroidal galaxy, discovered by A.G. Wilson of the Lowell Observatory, in the United States, during the Palomar Sky Survey in 1955. It lies in the constellation Ursa Minor, and is a satellite galaxy of the Milky Way. The galaxy consists mainly of older stars and seems to house little to no ongoing star formation. Its centre is around 225,000 light years distant from Earth.

== Evolutionary history ==
In 1999, Kenneth Mighell and Christopher Burke used the Hubble Space Telescope to confirm that the Ursa Minor dwarf galaxy had a straightforward evolutionary history with a single burst of star formation that lasted around 2 billion years and took place around 14 billion years ago, and that the galaxy was probably as old as the Milky Way itself.

== See also ==
- Ursa Major I Dwarf
- Ursa Major II Dwarf
