= UGC 11411 =

Dark matter dominated star forming dwarf galaxy

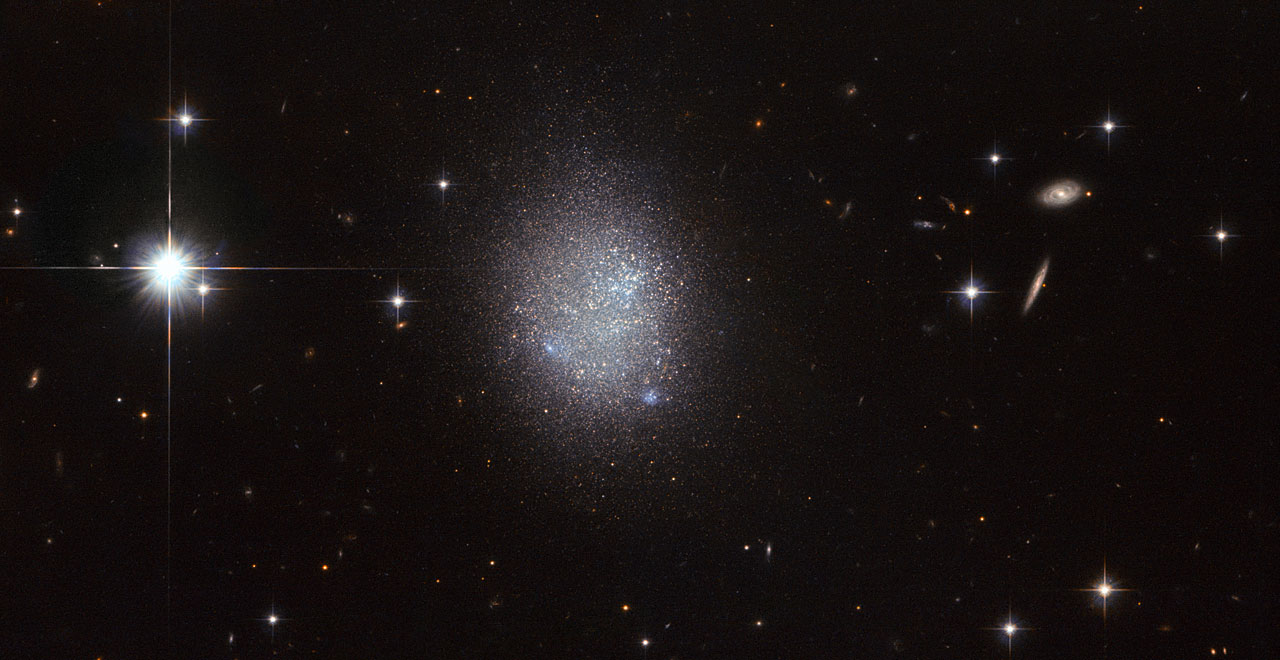
- UGC 11411 imaged by the Hubble Space Telescope. The bright object to the left is a foreground star.

Observation data (J2000 epoch)
- Constellation: Draco
- Right ascension: 19^{h} 08^{m} 42.5361^{s}
- Declination: +70° 17′ 02.966″
- Redshift: 0.000230±0.000127
- Heliocentric radial velocity: 69±38 km/s
- Distance: 21.46 Mly (6.580 Mpc)

Characteristics
- Type: Irregular blue compact dwarf
- Size: ~5,600 ly (1.72 kpc) (estimated)
- Apparent size (V): 0.463′ × 0.213′

Other designations
- PGC 62814, CGCG 341-018

UGC 11411 is an irregular blue compact dwarf galaxy located 15 million light years from Earth in the constellation of Draco. The first known reference to this galaxy comes from volume IV of the Catalogue of Galaxies and of Clusters of Galaxies compiled by Fritz Zwicky in 1968, where it was listed as CGCG 341-018.

UGC 11411 has an extremely high rate of star formation, even for other compact galaxies of its type. Many stars that are formed are hot blue stars that give the galaxy a blue tint. The galaxy has prominent nebula and numerous star clusters, especially in the northwest region.

The galaxy is dominated by dark matter, making it quite massive compared to dwarf galaxies of the same size.
