= UGC 6541 =

Galaxy in the constellation Ursa Major

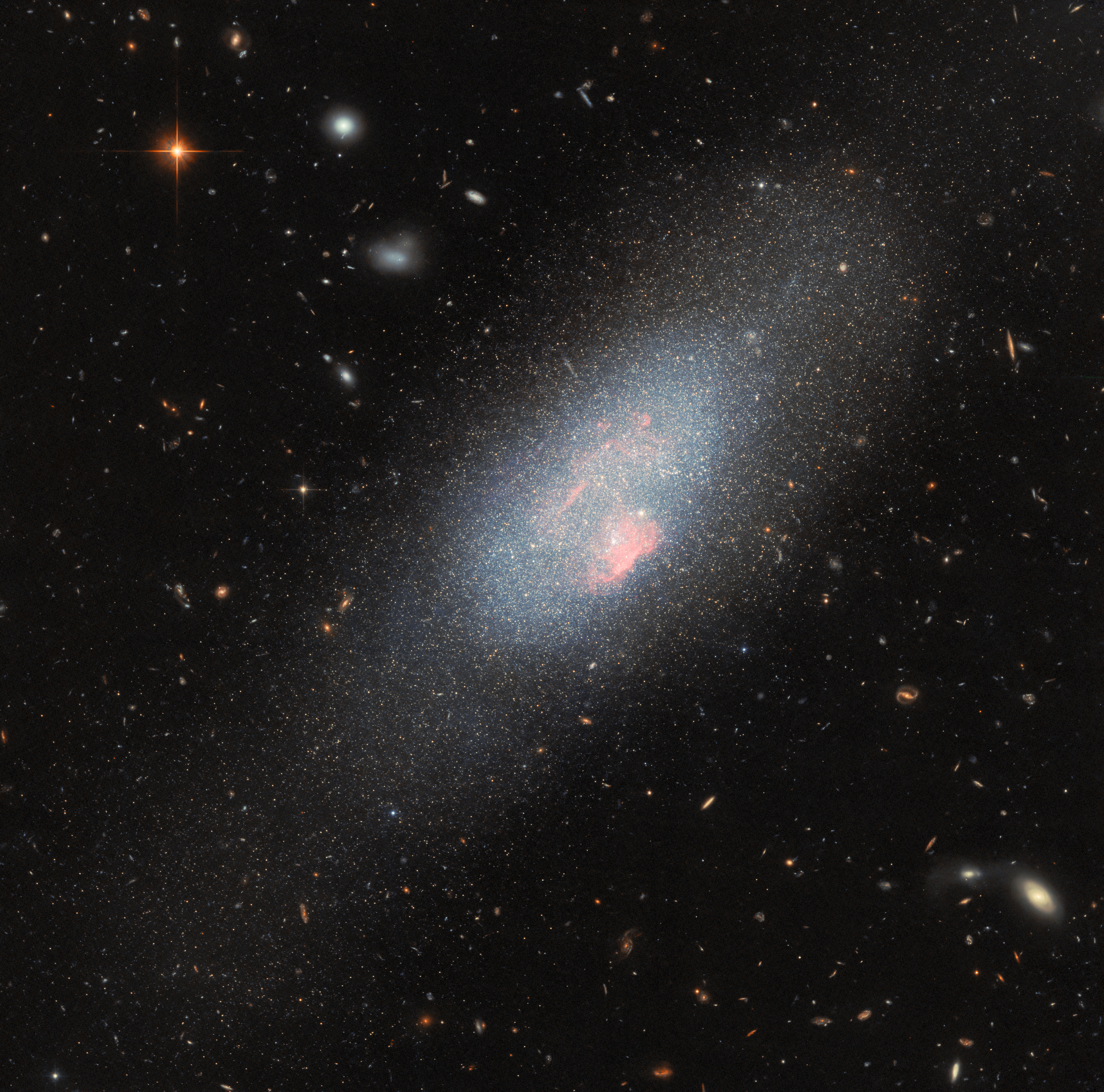
- UGC 6541 imaged by the Hubble Space Telescope

Observation data (J2000 epoch)
- Constellation: Ursa Major
- Right ascension: 11^{h} 33^{m} 28.9488^{s}
- Declination: +49° 14′ 13.012″
- Redshift: 0.000833±0.00000200
- Heliocentric radial velocity: 250±1 km/s
- Distance: 15.15 ± 2.10 Mly (4.644 ± 0.644 Mpc)
- Apparent magnitude (V): 14.50

Characteristics
- Type: Im
- Size: ~5,700 ly (1.76 kpc) (estimated)
- Apparent size (V): 1.2′ × 0.7′

Other designations
- HOLM 263A, MCG +08-21-053, Mrk 178, PGC 035684, CGCG 242-046

UGC 6541 (also known as Mrk 178) is a blue compact dwarf galaxy in the constellation of Ursa Major. Its velocity with respect to the cosmic microwave background is 455±14 km/s, which is too small to use to obtain a distance using Hubble's law. However, 10 non-redshift measurements give a mean distance of 15.15 ± 2.10 Mly (4.644 ± 0.644 Mpc). The first known reference to this galaxy comes from Erik Holmberg's A Study of Double and Multiple Galaxies Together with Inquiries into some General Metagalactic Problems, published in 1937, where UGC 6541 and UGC 6538 are listed together as Holm 263. However, since UGC 6538 is about 10 times further away, at a distance of 158.3 ± 11.1 Mly (48.55 ± 3.41 Mpc), the alignment is purely optical.

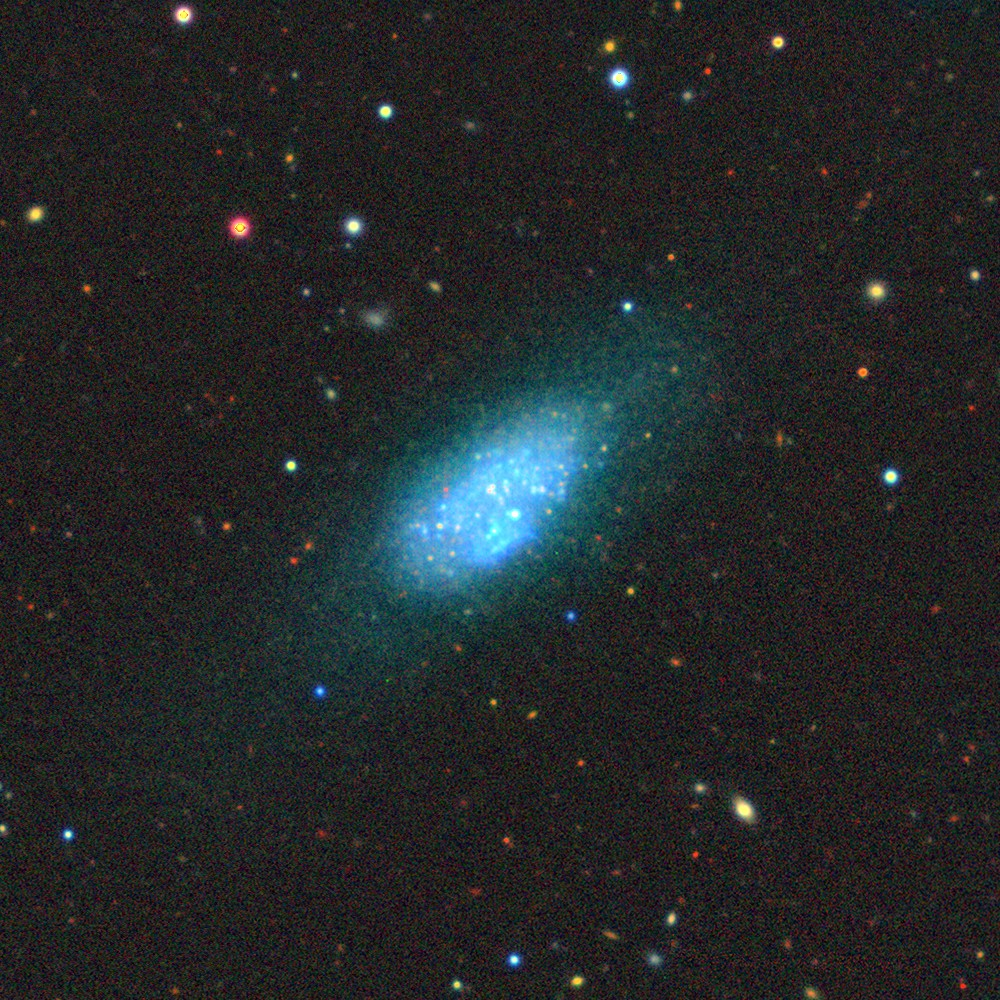
UGC 6541 imaged by Legacy Surveys

UGC 6541 has a possible active galactic nucleus, i.e. it has a compact region at the center of a galaxy that emits a significant amount of energy across the electromagnetic spectrum, with characteristics indicating that this luminosity is not produced by the stars. UGC 6541 is a galaxy whose nucleus shines brightly in the ultraviolet and is listed in the Markarian catalogue as Mrk 178.

The stellar and gas components of UGC 6541 have been extensively studied. An integrated H I intensity map shows a broken ring-like structure. Other integrated H I intensity maps show that this galaxy has a highly irregular shape to its gaseous disk. A detailed study of the Wolf-Rayet population revealed a large number of Wolf-Rayet stars in its brightest stellar component. The stellar population has been studied in detail, indicating that this galaxy had a higher star formation rate 500 million years ago compared to its current rate, and that this galaxy has an old underlying stellar population.
