= Phoenix Dwarf =

Galaxy in the constellation of Phoenix

Phoenix Dwarf Galaxy
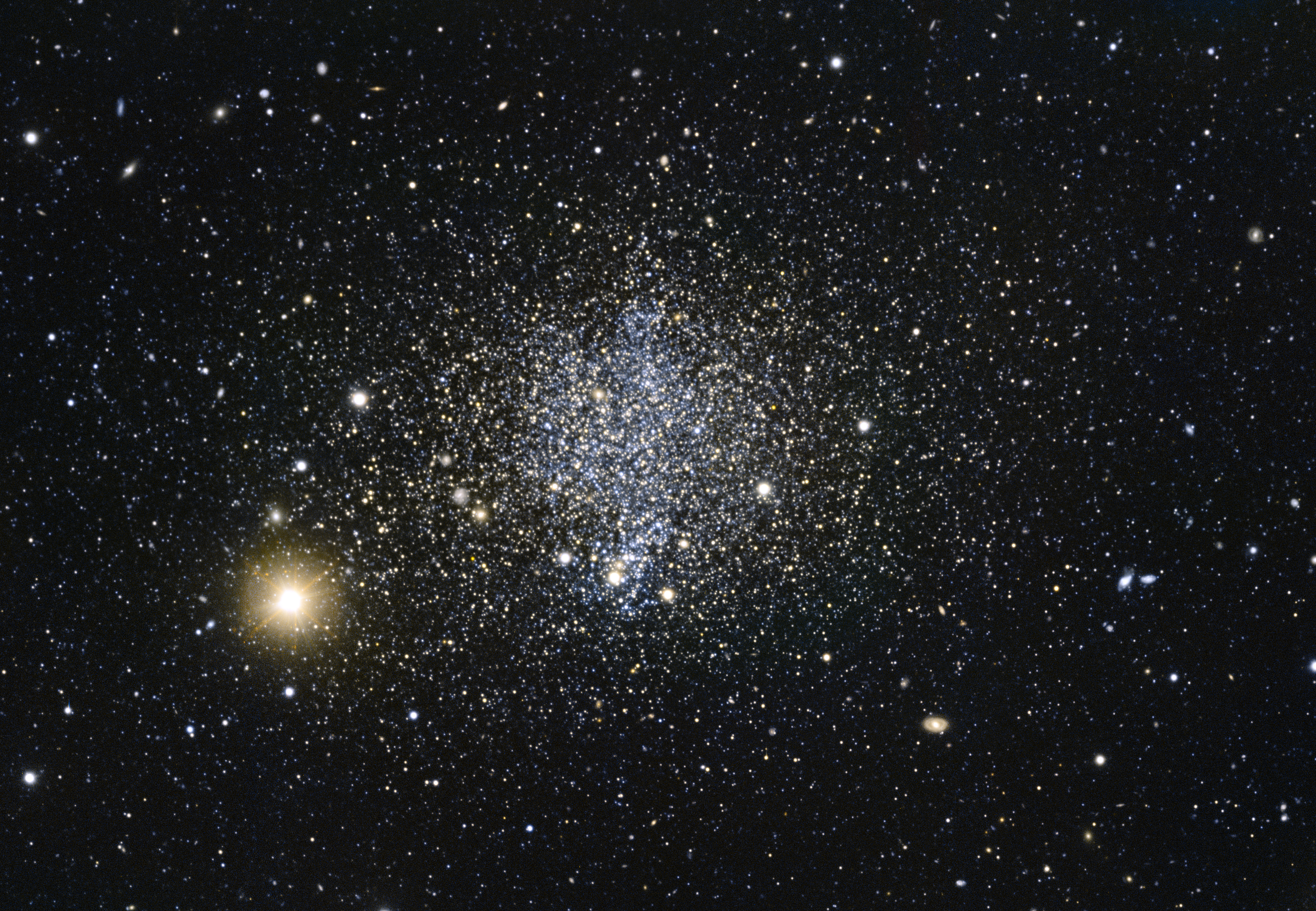
- Phoenix Dwarf by the Very Large Telescope

Observation data (J2000 epoch)
- Constellation: Phoenix
- Right ascension: 01^{h} 51^{m} 06.3^{s}
- Declination: −44° 26′ 41″
- Redshift: 60 ± 30 km/s
- Distance: 1.44 ± 0.07 Mly (440 ± 20 kpc)
- Apparent magnitude (V): 13.1

Characteristics
- Type: IAm
- Apparent size (V): 4′.9 × 4′.1
- Notable features: -

Other designations
- ESO 245- G 007, PGC 6830

The Phoenix Dwarf is a dwarf irregular galaxy discovered in 1976 by Hans-Emil Schuster and Richard Martin West and mistaken for a globular cluster. It is currently 1.44 Mly away from Earth. Its name comes from the fact that it lies within the constellation Phoenix.

== Characteristics ==
The Phoenix Dwarf has an inner part of young stars which is stretched in an east-west direction and an outer part of mainly old stars that is stretched north-south. The central region's rate of star formation seems to have been relatively constant across time (Martínez-Delgado et al. 1999). In 1999, St-Germain et al. discovered a H I region of about 10^{5} M_{☉} just to the west of Phoenix. Its radial velocity is −23 km/s and may be physically associated with Phoenix if it is found to have a similar radial velocity.
