= M85-HCC1 =

Ultracompact dwarf galaxy that is the densest galaxy known

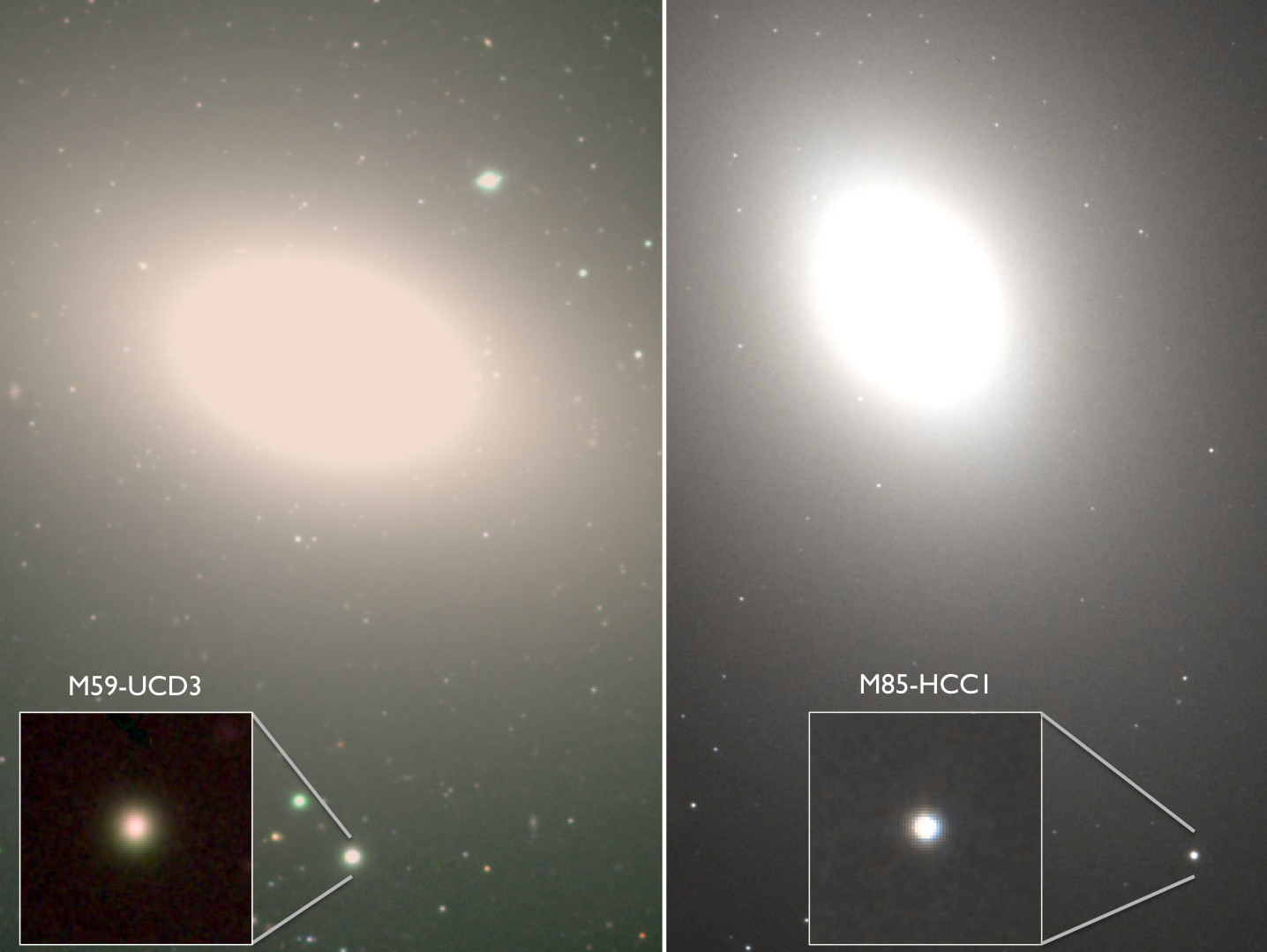
- Images of two ultracompact dwarf galaxies. M59-UCD3 is in the inset to the left, while M85-HCC1 is in the inset to the right.

Observation data (J2000 epoch)
- Constellation: Coma Berenices
- Right ascension: 12^{h} 25^{m} 22.842^{s}
- Declination: +18° 10′ 53.67″
- Heliocentric radial velocity: 658 ± 4
- Apparent magnitude (V): 18.80 ± 0.03
- Absolute magnitude (V): −12.55 ± 0.07

Characteristics
- Mass: (1.2±0.1)×10^{7} M_{☉}
- Half-light radius (physical): 1.85 ± 0.9 pc

Other designations
- 2MASS J12252287+1810539, SDSS J122522.84+181053.6

M85-HCC1 is an ultracompact dwarf galaxy with a star density 1,000,000 times that of the solar neighbourhood, lying near the galaxy Messier 85. As of 2015, it is the densest galaxy known.

== See also ==
- List of most massive galaxies

== See also ==
- M59-UCD3 (second-densest galaxy known, as of 2015)
- M60-UCD1 (another dense galaxy)
