= Satellite galaxy =

Galaxy that orbits a larger galaxy due to gravitational attraction

Satellite galaxies of the Milky Way

A satellite galaxy is a smaller companion galaxy that travels on bound orbits within the gravitational potential of a more massive and luminous host galaxy (also known as the primary galaxy). Satellite galaxies and their constituents are bound to their host galaxy, in the same way that planets within the Solar System are gravitationally bound to the Sun. While most satellite galaxies are dwarf galaxies, satellite galaxies of large galaxy clusters can be much more massive. The Milky Way is orbited by about fifty satellite galaxies, the largest of which is the Large Magellanic Cloud.

Moreover, satellite galaxies are not the only astronomical objects that are gravitationally bound to larger host galaxies (see globular clusters). For this reason, astronomers have defined galaxies as gravitationally bound collections of stars that exhibit properties that cannot be explained by a combination of baryonic matter (i.e. ordinary matter) and Newton's laws of gravity. For example, measurements of the orbital speed of stars and gas within spiral galaxies result in a velocity curve that deviates significantly from the theoretical prediction. This observation has motivated various explanations such as the theory of dark matter and modifications to Newtonian dynamics. Therefore, despite also being satellites of host galaxies, globular clusters should not be mistaken for satellite galaxies. Satellite galaxies are not only more extended and diffuse compared to globular clusters, but are also enshrouded in massive dark matter halos that are thought to have been endowed to them during the formation process.

Satellite galaxies generally lead tumultuous lives due to their chaotic interactions with both the larger host galaxy and other satellites. For example, the host galaxy is capable of disrupting the orbiting satellites via tidal and ram pressure stripping. These environmental effects can remove large amounts of cold gas from satellites (i.e. the fuel for star formation), and this can result in satellites becoming quiescent in the sense that they have ceased to form stars. Moreover, satellites can also collide with their host galaxy resulting in a minor merger (i.e. merger event between galaxies of significantly different masses). On the other hand, satellites can also merge with one another resulting in a major merger (i.e. merger event between galaxies of comparable masses). Galaxies are mostly composed of empty space, interstellar gas and dust, and therefore galaxy mergers do not necessarily involve collisions between objects from one galaxy and objects from the other, however, these events generally result in much more massive galaxies. Consequently, astronomers seek to constrain the rate at which both minor and major mergers occur to better understand the formation of gigantic structures of gravitationally bound conglomerations of galaxies such as galactic groups and clusters.

== History ==
=== Early 20th century ===
Prior to the 20th century, the notion that galaxies existed beyond the Milky Way was not well established. In fact, the idea was so controversial at the time that it led to what is now heralded as the "Shapley-Curtis Great Debate" aptly named after the astronomers Harlow Shapley and Heber Doust Curtis that debated the nature of "nebulae" and the size of the Milky Way at the National Academy of Sciences on April 26, 1920. Shapley argued that the Milky Way was the entire universe (spanning over 100,000 lightyears or 30 kiloparsec across) and that all of the observed "nebulae" (currently known as galaxies) resided within this region. On the other hand, Curtis argued that the Milky Way was much smaller and that the observed nebulae were in fact galaxies similar to the Milky Way. This debate was not settled until late 1923 when the astronomer Edwin Hubble measured the distance to M31 (currently known as the Andromeda galaxy) using Cepheid Variable stars. By measuring the period of these stars, Hubble was able to estimate their intrinsic luminosity and upon combining this with their measured apparent magnitude he estimated a distance of 300 kpc, which was an order-of-magnitude larger than the estimated size of the universe made by Shapley. This measurement verified that not only was the universe much larger than previously expected, but it also demonstrated that the observed nebulae were actually distant galaxies with a wide range of morphologies (see Hubble sequence).

=== Modern times ===
Despite Hubble's discovery that the universe was teeming with galaxies, a majority of the satellite galaxies of the Milky Way and the Local Group remained undetected until the advent of modern astronomical surveys such as the Sloan Digital Sky Survey (SDSS) and the Dark Energy Survey (DES). In particular, the Milky Way is currently known to host 59 satellite galaxies (see satellite galaxies of the Milky Way), of which two known as the Large Magellanic Cloud and Small Magellanic Cloud have been observable in the Southern Hemisphere with the unaided eye since ancient times. Nevertheless, modern cosmological theories of galaxy formation and evolution predict a much larger number of satellite galaxies than what is observed (see missing satellites problem). However, more recent high resolution simulations have demonstrated that the current number of observed satellites pose no threat to the prevalent theory of galaxy formation.

Animation illustrating the discovery history of satellite galaxies of the Milky Way over the last 100 years. The classical satellite galaxies are in blue (labeled with their names), SDSS-discoveries are in red, and more recent discoveries (mostly with DES) are in green.

=== Motivations to study satellite galaxies ===
Spectroscopic, photometric and kinematic observations of satellite galaxies have yielded a wealth of information that has been used to study, among other things, the formation and evolution of galaxies, the environmental effects that enhance and diminish the rate of star formation within galaxies and the distribution of dark matter within the dark matter halo. As a result, satellite galaxies serve as a testing ground for prediction made by cosmological models.

== Classification of satellite galaxies ==
As mentioned above, satellite galaxies are generally categorized as dwarf galaxies and therefore follow a similar Hubble classification scheme as their host with the minor addition of a lowercase "d" in front of the various standard types to designate the dwarf galaxy status. These types include dwarf irregular (dI), dwarf spheroidal (dSph), dwarf elliptical (dE) and dwarf spiral (dS). However, out of all of these types it is believed that dwarf spirals are not satellites, but rather dwarf galaxies that are only found in the field.

=== Dwarf irregular satellite galaxies ===
Dwarf irregular satellite galaxies are characterized by their chaotic and asymmetric appearance, low gas fractions, high star formation rate and low metallicity. Three of the closest dwarf irregular satellites of the Milky Way include the Small Magellanic Cloud, Canis Major Dwarf, and the newly discovered Antlia 2.

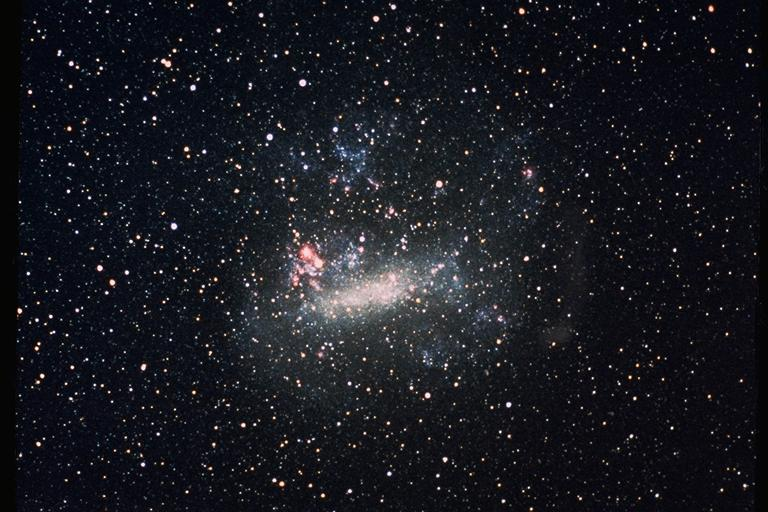
The Large Magellanic Cloud, the Milky Way's largest satellite galaxy, and fourth largest in the Local Group. This satellite is also classified as a transition type between a dwarf spiral and dwarf irregular.

=== Dwarf elliptical satellite galaxies ===
Dwarf elliptical satellite galaxies are characterized by their oval appearance on the sky, disordered motion of constituent stars, moderate to low metallicity, low gas fractions and old stellar population. Dwarf elliptical satellite galaxies in the Local Group include NGC 147, NGC 185, and NGC 205, which are satellites of our neighboring Andromeda galaxy.

=== Dwarf spheroidal satellite galaxies ===
Dwarf spheroidal satellite galaxies are characterized by their diffuse appearance, low surface brightness, high mass-to-light ratio (i.e. dark matter dominated), low metallicity, low gas fractions and old stellar population. Moreover, dwarf spheroidals make up the largest population of known satellite galaxies of the Milky Way. A few of these satellites include Hercules, Pisces II and Leo IV, which are named after the constellation in which they are found.

=== Transitional types ===
As a result of minor mergers and environmental effects, some dwarf galaxies are classified as intermediate or transitional type satellite galaxies. For example, Phoenix and LGS3 are classified as intermediate types that appear to be transitioning from dwarf irregulars to dwarf spheroidals. Furthermore, the Large Magellanic Cloud is considered to be in the process of transitioning from a dwarf spiral to a dwarf irregular.

== Formation of satellite galaxies ==
According to the standard model of cosmology (known as the ΛCDM model), the formation of satellite galaxies is intricately connected to the observed large-scale structure of the Universe. Specifically, the ΛCDM model is based on the premise that the observed large-scale structure is the result of a bottom-up hierarchical process that began after the recombination epoch in which electrically neutral hydrogen atoms were formed as a result of free electrons and protons binding together. As the ratio of neutral hydrogen to free protons and electrons grew, so did fluctuations in the baryonic matter density. These fluctuations rapidly grew to the point that they became comparable to dark matter density fluctuations. Moreover, the smaller mass fluctuations grew to nonlinearity, became virialized (i.e. reached gravitational equilibrium), and were then hierarchically clustered within successively larger bound systems.

The gas within these bound systems condensed and rapidly cooled into cold dark matter halos that steadily increased in size by coalescing together and accumulating additional gas via a process known as accretion. The largest bound objects formed from this process are known as superclusters, such as the Virgo Supercluster, that contain smaller clusters of galaxies that are themselves surrounded by even smaller dwarf galaxies. Furthermore, in this model dwarfs galaxies are considered to be the fundamental building blocks that give rise to more massive galaxies, and the satellites that are observed around these galaxies are the dwarfs that have yet to be consumed by their host.

=== Accumulation of mass in dark matter halos ===
A crude yet useful method to determine how dark matter halos progressively gain mass through mergers of less massive halos can be explained using the excursion set formalism, also known as the extended Press-Schechter formalism (EPS). Among other things, the EPS formalism can be used to infer the fraction of mass $M_2$ that originated from collapsed objects of a specific mass at an earlier time $t_1 < t_2$ by applying the statistics of Markovian random walks to the trajectories of mass elements in $(S,\delta)$-space, where $S = \sigma^2(M)$ and $\delta = {\rho(x) - \bar{\rho} \over \bar{\rho} }$ represent the mass variance and overdensity, respectively.

In particular the EPS formalism is founded on the ansatz that states "the fraction of trajectories with a first upcrossing of the barrier $\delta_S = \delta_{critical}(t)$ at $S > S_1 = \sigma^2(M_1)$ is equal to the mass fraction at time $t$ that is incorporated in halos with masses $M<M_1$". Consequently, this ansatz ensures that each trajectory will upcross the barrier $\delta_S = \delta_{critical}(t)$ given some arbitrarily large $S$, and as a result it guarantees that each mass element will ultimately become part of a halo.

Furthermore, the fraction of mass $M_2$ that originated from collapsed objects of a specific mass at an earlier time $t_1 < t_2$ can be used to determine average number of progenitors at time $t_1$ within the mass interval $(M_1, M_1 + dM_1)$ that have merged to produce a halo of $M_2$ at time $t_2$. This is accomplished by considering a spherical region of mass $M_2$ with a corresponding mass variance $S_2 = \sigma^2(M_2)$ and linear overdensity $\delta_2 = \delta_c(t_2) = {\delta_c \over D(t_2)}$, where $D(t_2)$ is the linear growth rate that is normalized to unity at time $t_2$ and $\delta_c$ is the critical overdensity at which the initial spherical region has collapsed to form a virialized object. Mathematically, the progenitor mass function is expressed as:
$$N(M_1,t_1|M_2,t_2)\operatorname{dM_1} = \frac{M_2}{M_1}f_{PS}(\nu_{12})\Bigg|{\operatorname{d}\ln(\nu_{12}) \over \operatorname{d}\ln(M_1)}\Bigg| \operatorname{dM_1}$$
where $\nu_{12} = { \delta_1 - \delta_2 \over \sqrt{S_1 - S_2}}$ and $f_{PS}(\nu_{12}) = \sqrt{2 \over \pi}\nu_{12}\exp({-\nu_{12}^2 \over 2})$ is the Press-Schechter multiplicity function that describes the fraction of mass associated with halos in a range $\ln(\nu_{12})$.

Various comparisons of the progenitor mass function with numerical simulations have concluded that good agreement between theory and simulation is obtained only when $\Delta t = t_2 - t_1$ is small, otherwise the mass fraction in high mass progenitors is significantly underestimated, which can be attributed to the crude assumptions such as assuming a perfectly spherical collapse model and using a linear density field as opposed to a non-linear density field to characterize collapsed structures. Nevertheless, the utility of the EPS formalism is that it provides a computationally friendly approach for determining properties of dark matter halos.

=== Halo merger rate ===
Another utility of the EPS formalism is that it can be used to determine the rate at which a halo of initial mass M merges with a halo with mass between M and M+ΔM. This rate is given by

$$\mathcal{P}(\Delta M | M,t)\operatorname{d}\ln\Delta M \operatorname{d} \ln t =  \frac{1}{\sqrt{2\pi}}\Bigg[\frac{S_{1}}{(S_1 - S_2)}\Bigg]^{3/2} \exp \Bigg[- \frac{\delta_c^2(S_1 - S_2)}{2S_1 S_2}\Bigg]\Bigg|\frac{\operatorname{d} \ln \delta_c}{\operatorname{d} \ln t}\Bigg| \Bigg|\frac{\operatorname{d} \ln S_2}{\operatorname{d} \ln \Delta M}\Bigg| \frac{\delta_c}{\sqrt{S_2}} \mathrm{d} \ln t \, \mathrm{d} \ln \Delta M$$

where $S_1 = \sigma^2(M)$, $S_2 = \sigma^2(M + \Delta M)$. In general the change in mass, $\Delta M$, is the sum of a multitude of minor mergers. Nevertheless, given an infinitesimally small time interval $\operatorname{dt}$ it is reasonable to consider the change in mass to be due to a single merger events in which $M_1$ transitions to $M_2$.

== Galactic cannibalism (minor mergers) ==
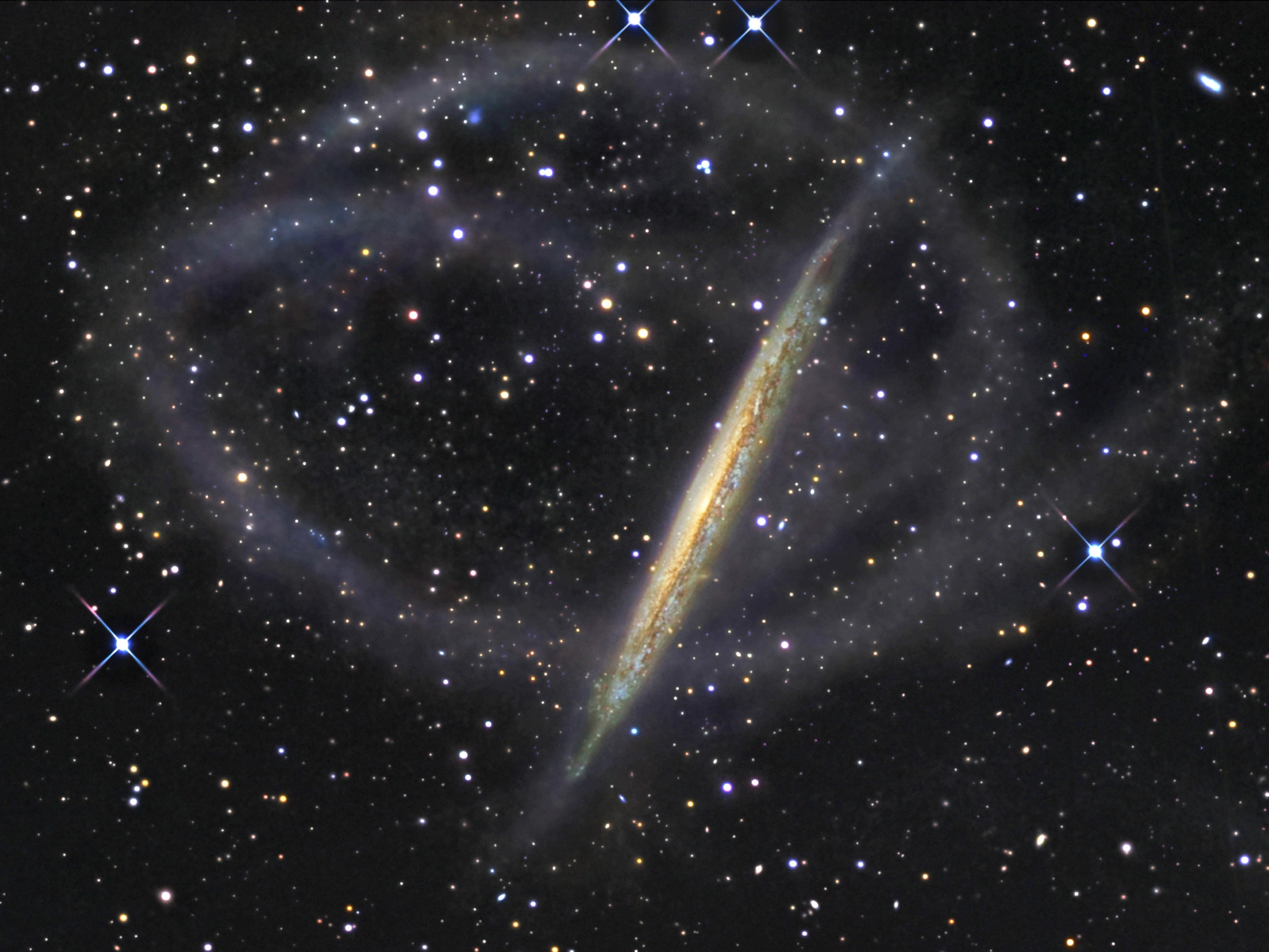
Remnants of a minor merger can be observed in the form of a stellar stream falling onto the galaxy NGC 5907.

Throughout their lifespan, satellite galaxies orbiting in the dark matter halo experience dynamical friction and consequently descend deeper into the gravitational potential of their host as a result of orbital decay. Throughout the course of this descent, stars in the outer region of the satellite are steadily stripped away due to tidal forces from the host galaxy. This process, which is an example of a minor merger, continues until the satellite is completely disrupted and consumed by the host galaxies. Evidence of this destructive process can be observed in stellar debris streams around distant galaxies.

=== Orbital decay rate ===
As satellites orbit their host and interact with each other they progressively lose small amounts of kinetic energy and angular momentum due to dynamical friction. Consequently, the distance between the host and the satellite progressively decreases in order to conserve angular momentum. This process continues until the satellite ultimately mergers with the host galaxy. Furthermore, If we assume that the host is a singular isothermal sphere (SIS) and the satellite is a SIS that is sharply truncated at the radius at which it begins to accelerate towards the host (known as the Jacobi radius), then the time $t_{\mathrm fric}$ that it takes for dynamical friction to result in a minor merger can be approximated as follows:
$$t_\mathrm{fric} = \frac{2.34}{\ln\Lambda} \frac{\sigma^{2}_{\mathcal M}}{\sigma^{3}_{\mathrm s}} r_{\mathrm i} = \frac{2.7 \  \mathrm{Gyr}}{\ln \Lambda}\frac{r_{\mathrm i}}{30 \  \mathrm{kpc}} \bigg( \frac{\sigma_{\mathcal M}}{200 \ \mathrm{km} \ \mathrm{s^{-1}}} \bigg)^2 \bigg(\frac{ 100 \mathrm{ \ km \ s^{-1}}}{\sigma_{\mathrm s}} \bigg)^3$$
where $r_i$ is the initial radius at $t = 0$, $\sigma_{\mathcal M}$ is the velocity dispersion of the host galaxy, $\sigma_{\mathrm s}$ is the velocity dispersion of the satellite and $\ln\Lambda$ is the Coulomb logarithm defined as $\ln\Lambda = \ln\Big( \frac{b_{\mathrm{max}}}{\mathrm{max}(r_ \mathrm h,GM/v_{\mathrm{typ}}^2)}\Big)$ with $b_{\max}$, $r_ \mathrm h$ and $v_\mathrm{typ}^2$ respectively representing the maximum impact parameter, the half-mass radius and the typical relative velocity. Moreover, both the half-mass radius and the typical relative velocity can be rewritten in terms of the radius and velocity dispersion such that $r_{\mathrm h} = \frac{\sigma_{\mathrm s}}{2^{3/2}\sigma_{\mathcal M}}r$ and $\frac{GM}{v^2_\mathrm{typ}} = \frac{\sqrt 2 \sigma_{\mathrm s}^2}{\sigma^3_\mathcal M}r$. Using the Faber-Jackson relation, the velocity dispersion of satellites and their host can be estimated individually from their observed luminosity. Therefore, using the equation above it is possible to estimate the time that it takes for a satellite galaxy to be consumed by the host galaxy.

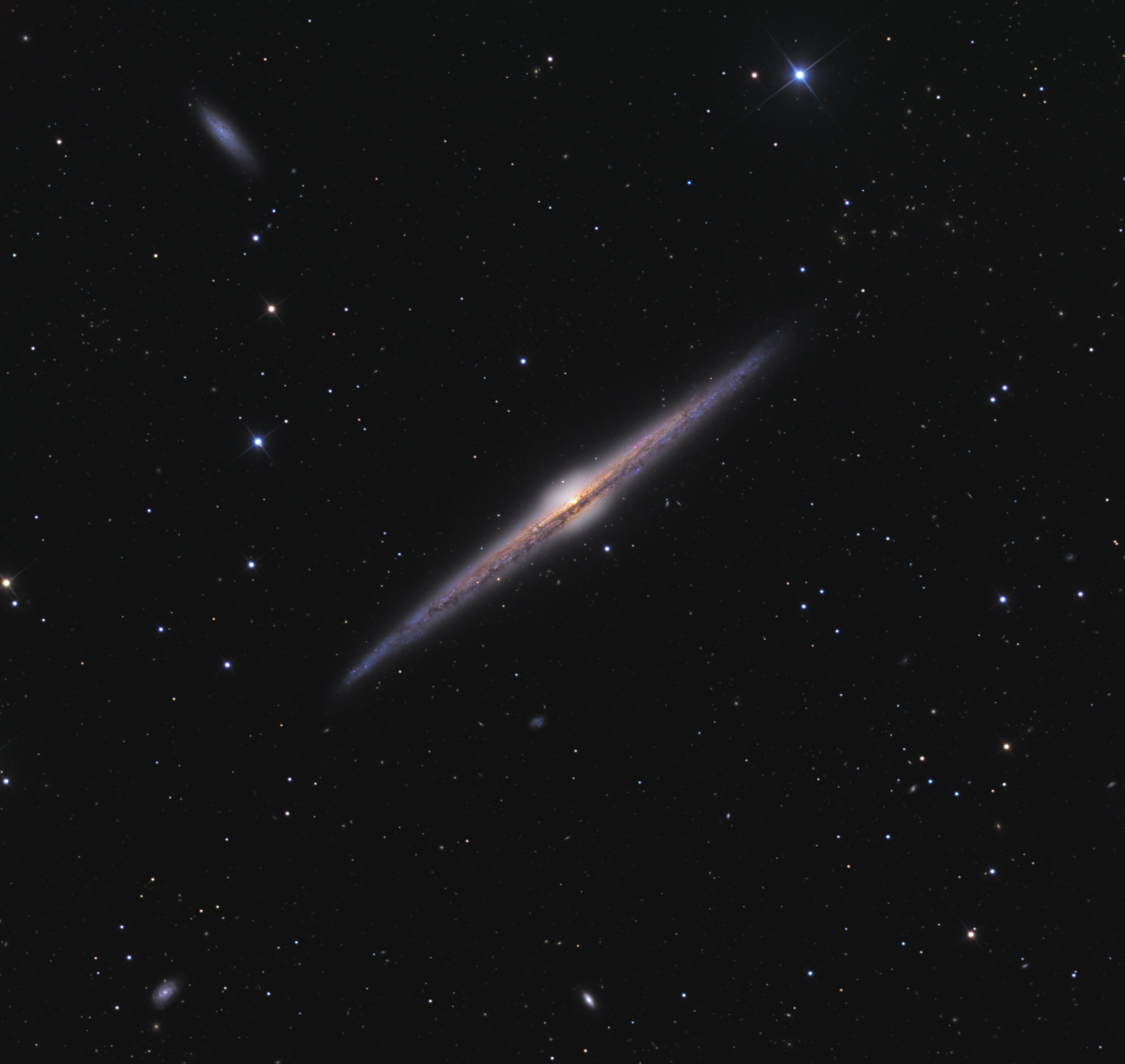
An edge-on photo of the Needle Galaxy (NGC 4565) that demonstrates the observed thick disk and thin disk components of satellite galaxies.

=== Minor merger driven star formation ===
In 1978, pioneering work involving the measurement of the colors of merger remnants by the astronomers Beatrice Tinsley and Richard Larson gave rise to the notion that mergers enhance star formation. Their observations showed that an anomalous blue color was associated with the merger remnants. Prior to this discovery, astronomers had already classified stars (see stellar classifications) and it was known that young, massive stars were bluer due to their light radiating at shorter wavelengths. Furthermore, it was also known that these stars live short lives due to their rapid consumption of fuel to remain in hydrostatic equilibrium. Therefore, the observation that merger remnants were associated with large populations of young, massive stars suggested that mergers induced rapid star formation (see starburst galaxy). Since this discovery was made, various observations have verified that mergers do indeed induce vigorous star formation. Despite major mergers being far more effective at driving star formation than minor mergers, it is known that minor mergers are significantly more common than major mergers so the cumulative effect of minor mergers over cosmic time is postulated to also contribute heavily to burst of star formation.

=== Minor mergers and the origins of thick disk components ===
Observations of edge-on galaxies suggest the universal presence of a thin disk, thick disk and halo component of galaxies. Despite the apparent ubiquity of these components, there is still ongoing research to determine if the thick disk and thin disk are truly distinct components. Nevertheless, many theories have been proposed to explain the origin of the thick disk component, and among these theories is one that involves minor mergers. In particular, it is speculated that the preexisting thin disk component of a host galaxy is heated during a minor merger and consequently the thin disk expands to form a thicker disk component.

== See also ==
- Dwarf galaxy
- Dwarf spheroidal galaxy
- Dwarf elliptical galaxy
- Galaxy merger
- Orbital decay
- Tidal stripping
- Hubble sequence
- Starburst galaxy
- Galactic tide
- Interacting galaxy
- Satellite galaxies of the Milky Way
- Satellite galaxies of Andromeda
- Ram pressure
