= Leo V (dwarf galaxy) =

Galaxy

Leo V Dwarf Galaxy
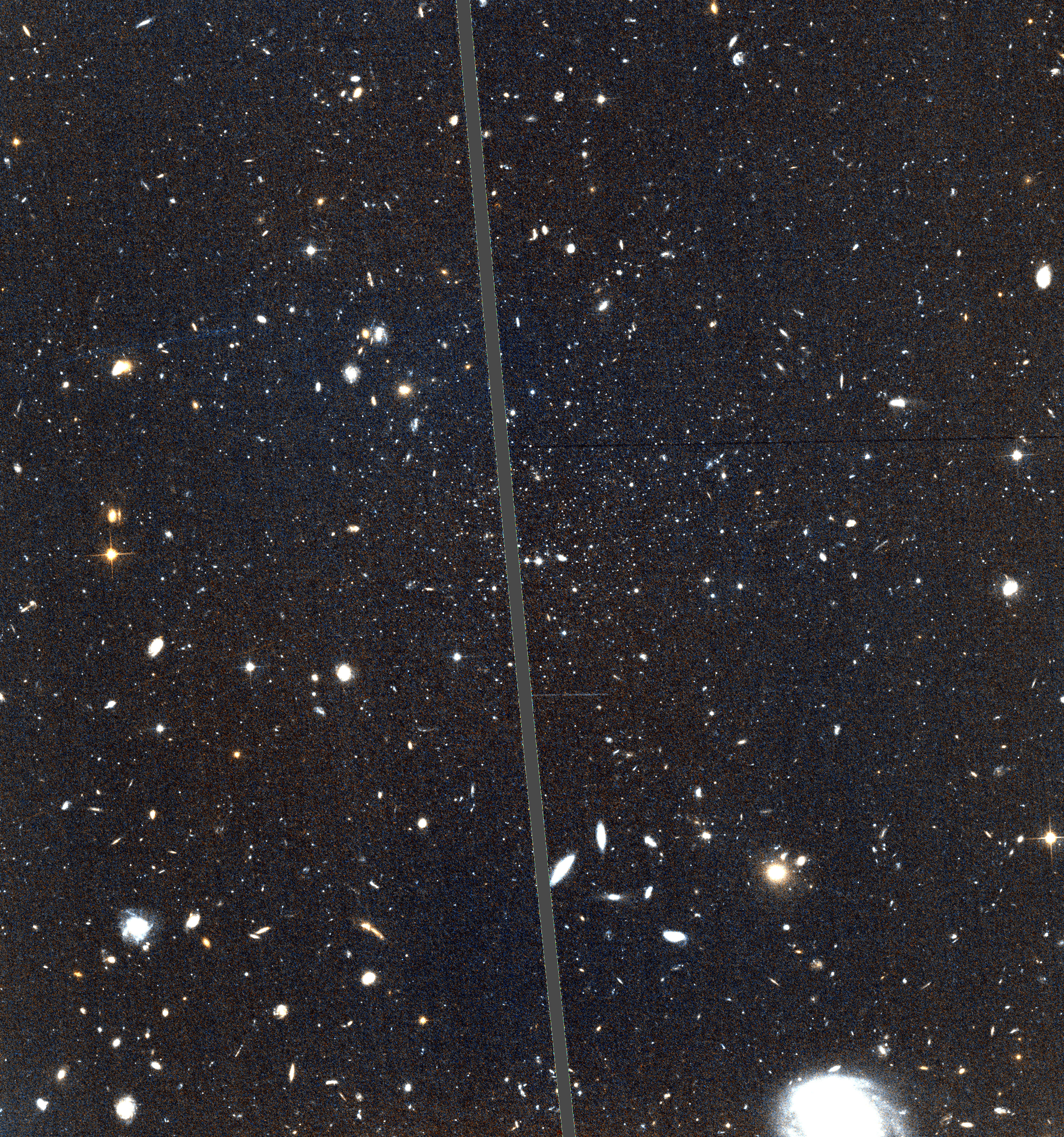
- Leo V with Hubble (faint stars in the middle)

Observation data (J2000 epoch)
- Constellation: Leo
- Right ascension: 11^{h} 31^{m} 9.6^{s}
- Declination: +02° 13′ 12″
- Distance: 585 kly (180 kpc); 570 ± 30 kly (175 ± 9 kpc)
- Apparent magnitude (V): 16 ± 0.4

Characteristics
- Type: DSph
- Apparent size (V): 5.2 ± 1.2′

Other designations
- Leo V, PGC 4713563

Leo V is a dwarf spheroidal galaxy situated in the constellation Leo and discovered in 2007 in the data obtained by the Sloan Digital Sky Survey. The galaxy is located at a distance of about 180 kpc from the Sun and moves away from the Sun with the velocity of about 173 km/s. It is classified as a dwarf spheroidal galaxy (dSph) meaning that it has an approximately spherical shape with the half-light radius of about 130 pc. (Note: From other sources the absolute magnitude is about −4.3 and the half-light radius of 40 pc.)

Leo V is one of the smallest and faintest satellites of the Milky Way—its integrated luminosity is about 10,000 times that of the Sun (absolute visible magnitude of about −5.2 ± 0.4), which is much lower than the luminosity of a typical globular cluster. However, its mass is about 330 thousand solar masses, which means that Leo's V mass to light ratio is around 75. A relatively high mass to light ratio implies that Leo V is dominated by dark matter. The stellar population of Leo V consists mainly of old stars formed more than 12 billion years ago. The metallicity of these stars is also very low at [Fe/H] ≈ −2.0 ± 0.2, which means that they contain 100 times less heavy elements than the Sun.

The galaxy is located only 3 degrees away from another Milky Way satellite, Leo IV. The latter is also closer to the Sun by 20 kpc. These two galaxies may be physically associated with each other. There is evidence that they are connected by a star bridge.
