= M60-UCD1 =

Galaxy in the constellation Virgo

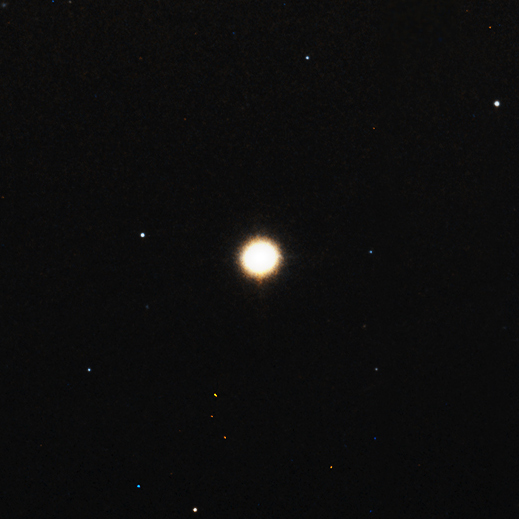
- A picture of M60-UCD1 taken by the Hubble Space Telescope

Observation data (J2000.0 epoch)
- Constellation: Virgo
- Right ascension: 12^{h} 43^{m} 35.976^{s}
- Declination: 11° 32^{m} 4.92^{s}
- Redshift: 0.004263±0.0
- Heliocentric radial velocity: 1,278±0 km/s
- Galactocentric velocity: 1,229±2 km/s
- Distance: 48.60 ± 3.262 Mly (14.9 ± 1.0 Mpc)h^{−1}_{0.6774} (Comoving)
- Group or cluster: M60 Group
- Apparent magnitude (V): 14.2

Characteristics
- Mass: (2.0±0.3)×10^{8} (dynamical mass) M_{☉}
- Size: 158 ± 3.26 ly (48.4 ± 1.0 pc) (Half-light diameter)
- Half-light radius (physical): 78.9 ± 1.63 ly (24.2 ± 0.5 pc)

Other designations
- M60-UCD1, SDSS J124335.96+113204.6

M60-UCD1 is an ultracompact dwarf galaxy. It is 49 million light years from Earth, close to Messier 60 (M60, NGC 4649) in the Virgo Cluster. Half of its stellar mass is in the central sphere 160 light years in diameter.

== Characteristics ==
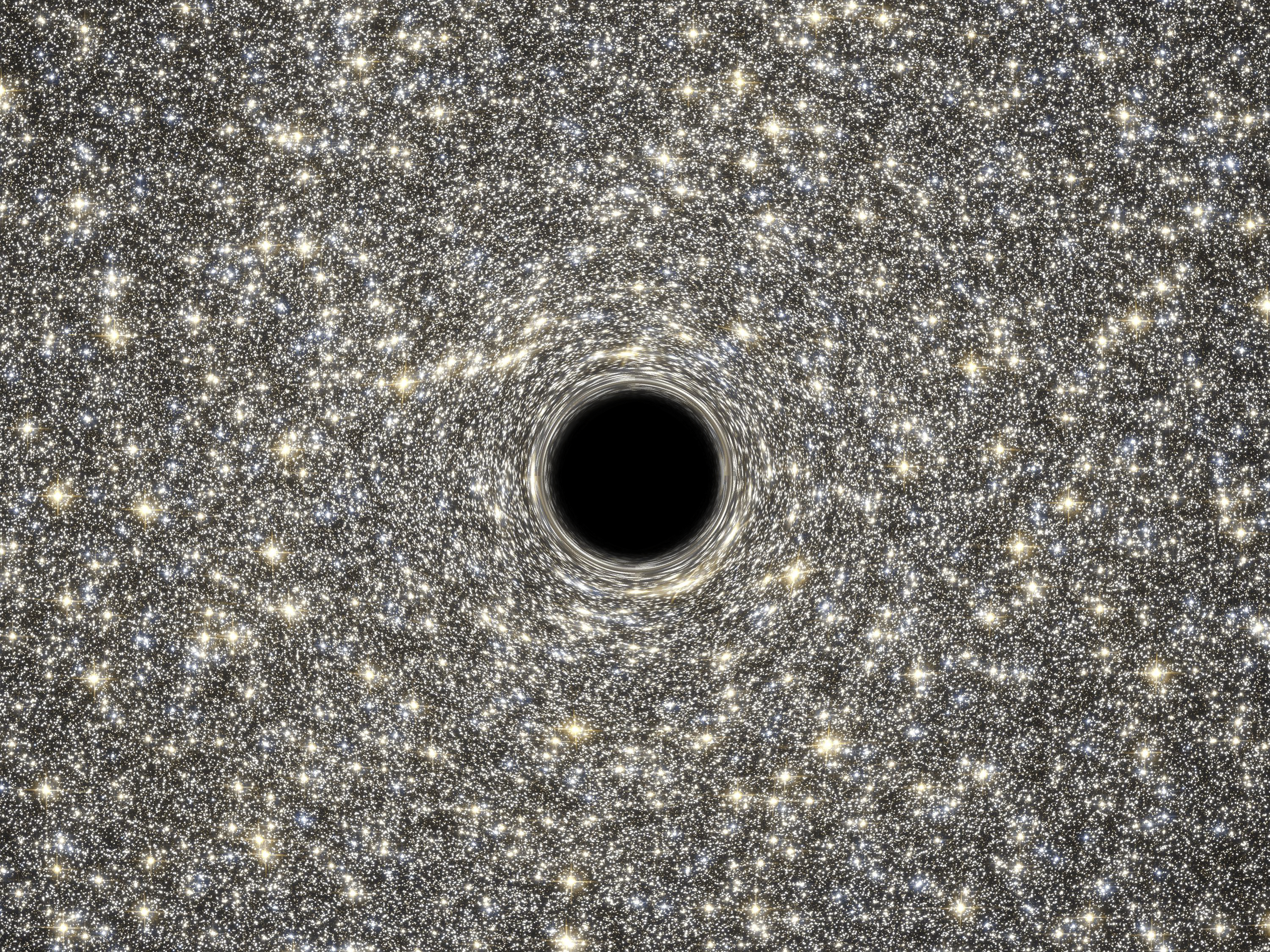
Artist's concept of supermassive black hole within M60-UCD1.

M60-UCD1's dynamical mass is 200±30 million solar masses (M_{☉}). Colours and lack of colour gradients indicate a uniform stellar population about 14.5±0.5 billion years old (indistinguishable from the age of the Universe). Their metallicity is similar to that of the Sun. The orbital velocity dispersion of the innermost stars exceeds 100 km/s, due to the gravity of a dense mass concentration. The galactic nucleus contains a bright and variable X-ray source, presumably a supermassive black hole with a mass of 20 million M_{☉} (10% of the dynamical mass of the entire galaxy). With this proportion of the mass of the black hole to that of the whole galaxy, it is one of the most black hole dominated galaxies known.

M60-UCD1 is believed to be the stripped core of a much more massive galaxy, whose mass was stripped in an encounter with M60 some 10 billion years ago. It may yet be absorbed completely by M60, its central black hole merging with M60's as well. The galaxy may have once had some 10 billion stars.

As of 2013, it is possibly the densest known galaxy with over one hundred stars per cubic light-year. As of 2014, it is the smallest and least massive galaxy known to host a central black hole. It was previously known as the most massive ultracompact dwarf galaxy known.

== See also ==
- M85-HCC1 – densest galaxy known, as of 2015.
