= Leo IV (dwarf galaxy) =

Galaxy in the constellation Leo

Leo IV Dwarf Galaxy
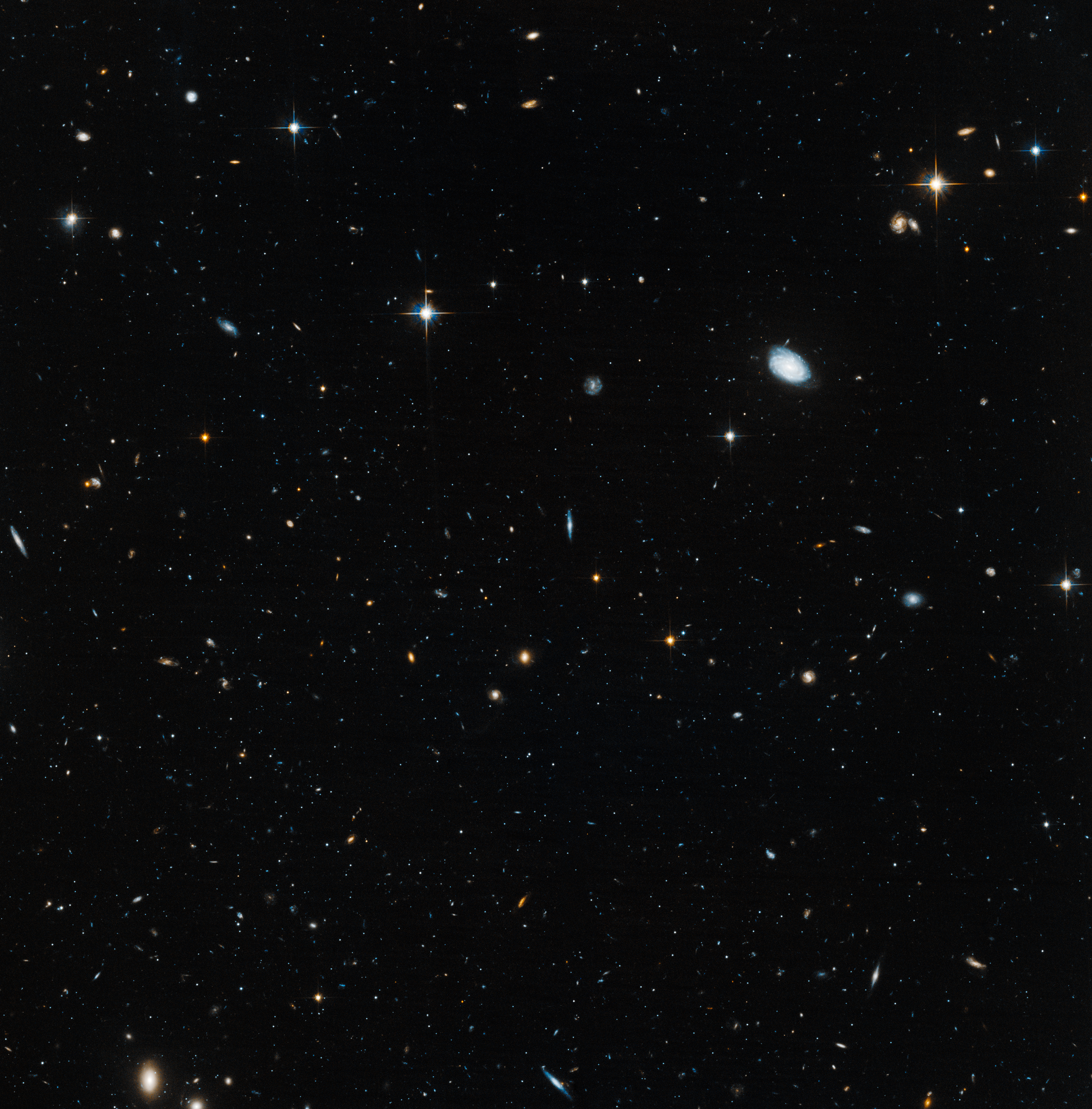
- View of the sparse stars of Leo IV, hardly distinguishable from the background.

Observation data (J2000 epoch)
- Constellation: Leo
- Right ascension: 11^{h} 32^{m} 57^{s}
- Declination: −00° 32′ 00″
- Distance: 520+49 −45 kly (160+15 −14 kpc); 154±4 kpc
- Apparent magnitude (V): 15.9±0.5

Characteristics
- Type: dSph
- Apparent size (V): 5.7′

Other designations
- Leo IV, PGC 4713561

Leo IV is a dwarf spheroidal galaxy situated in the constellation Leo, discovered in 2006 in the data obtained by the Sloan Digital Sky Survey. The galaxy is located at the distance of about 160 kpc from the Sun and moves away from the Sun with the velocity of about 130 km/s. It is classified as a dwarf spheroidal galaxy (dSph) meaning that it has an approximately round shape with the half-light radius of about 130 pc. (Note: From other sources the half-radius is around 160 pc.)

Leo IV is one of the smallest and faintest satellites of the Milky Way; its integrated luminosity is about 15000 times that of the Sun (absolute visible magnitude of −5.5±0.3), which is much lower than the luminosity of a typical globular cluster. However, its mass is about 1.5 million solar masses, which means that Leo's mass to light ratio is around 150. A high mass to light ratio implies that Leo IV is dominated by the dark matter.

The stellar population of Leo IV consists mainly of old stars formed more than 12 billion years ago. The metallicity of these old stars is also very low at [Fe/H] ≈ −2.58 ± 0.75, which means that they contain 400 times less heavy elements than the Sun. The observed stars were primarily red giants, although a number of Horizontal branch stars including three RR Lyrae variable stars were also discovered. (Note: The distance to Leo IV measured using RR Lyrae stars is 154±4 kpc.) The stars of Leo IV were probably among the first stars to form in the Universe. Nevertheless, the detailed study of the stellar population revealed the presence of a small number of much younger stars with the age of about 2 billion years or less. This discovery points to a complicated star formation history of this galaxy. Currently there is no star formation in Leo IV. The measurements have so far failed to detect any neutral hydrogen in it—the upper limit is just 600 solar masses.

In 2008, another galaxy called Leo V was discovered in the vicinity of Leo IV. The former is located 20 kpc further from the Milky Way than the latter and 3 degrees (~ 10 kpc) away from it. These two galaxies may be physically associated with each other.
