= Amateur astronomy =

Hobby of watching the sky and stars

Amateur astronomers watch the night sky during the Perseid meteor shower.

Amateur astronomy is a hobby where participants enjoy observing, studying, or imaging celestial objects in the sky using the unaided eye, binoculars, telescopes, and other gadgets. Although scientific research may not be their primary goal, some amateur astronomers contribute to citizen science by monitoring variable stars, double stars, sunspots, and occultations of stars by the Moon or asteroids, as well as by discovering transient astronomical events, such as comets, galactic novae or supernovae in other galaxies.

Amateur astronomers do not use the field of astronomy as their primary source of income or support, as well as typically having no professional degree in astrophysics or advanced academic training in the subject. Most amateur astronomers are hobbyists, while others have a high degree of experience in astronomy and may often assist and work alongside professional astronomers. Many astronomers have studied the sky throughout history in an amateur framework; however, since the beginning of the twentieth century, professional astronomy has become a clearly distinguished activity from amateur astronomy and associated activities.

Amateur astronomers typically view the sky at night, when most celestial objects and astronomical events are visible, but others observe during the daytime by viewing the Sun and solar eclipses. Some observe the sky using nothing more than their eyes or binoculars, while more dedicated amateurs often use portable telescopes or telescopes situated in their private or club observatories. However, light pollution has made amateur astronomy increasingly difficult to observe celestial objects, as sky glow washes out darkness and minimizes visibility. Amateurs commonly join amateur astronomical societies, which can advise, educate, or guide individuals towards ways of finding and observing celestial objects. Astronomical societies also promote the science of astronomy among the general public.

== Objectives ==
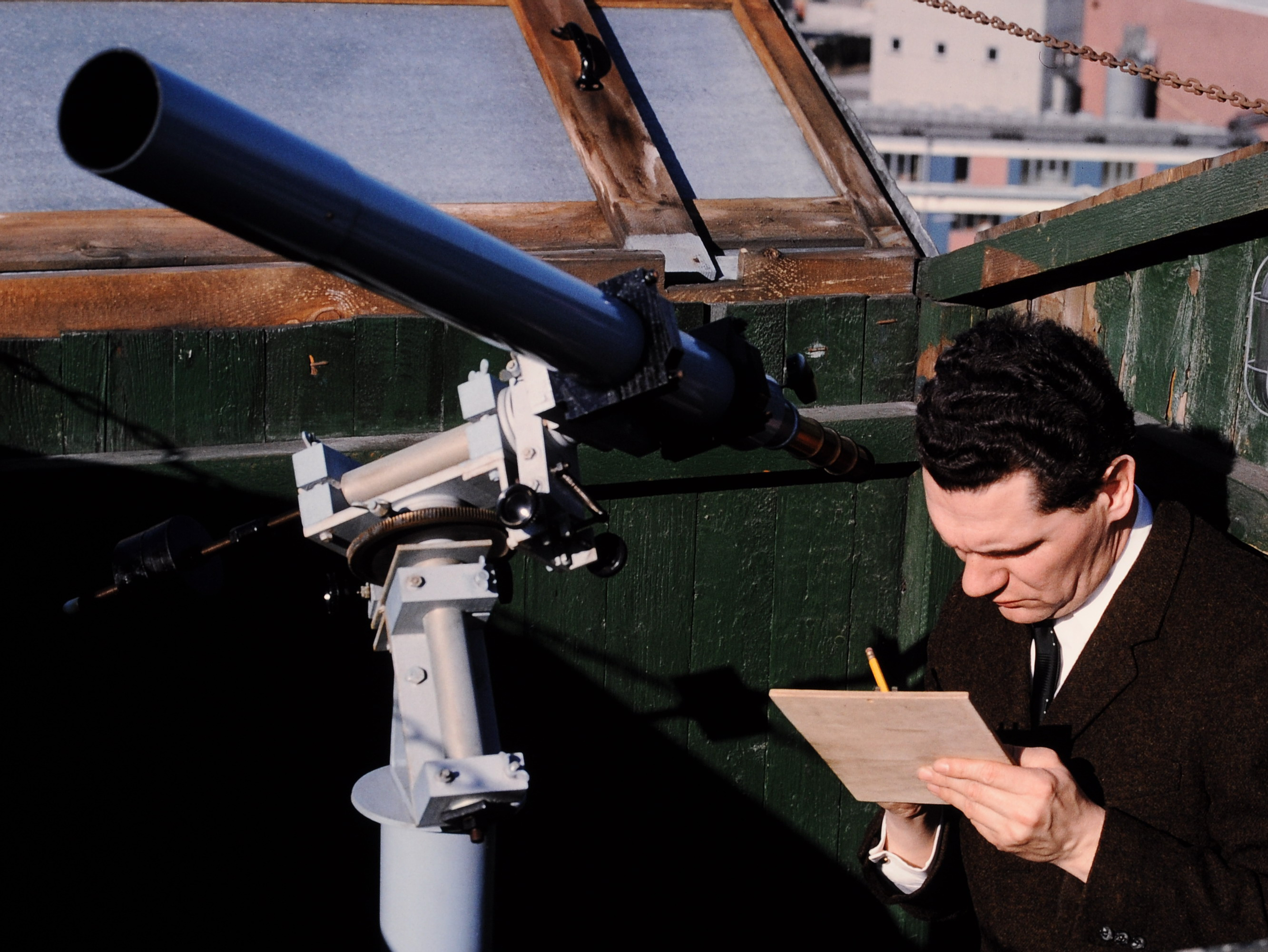
Amateur astronomer recording observations of the sun.

Collectively, amateur astronomers observe a variety of celestial objects and phenomena. Common targets of amateur astronomers include the Sun, the Moon, planets, stars, comets, meteor showers, and a variety of deep sky objects such as star clusters, galaxies, and nebulae. Amateur astronomers purse their work in order to educate the public, make contributions to the scientific world, and express their passion. Many amateurs like to specialize in observing particular objects, types of objects, or types of events which interest them.

One branch of amateur astronomy, amateur astrophotography, involves the taking of photos of the night sky. Astrophotography has become more popular with the introduction of far easier to use equipment including digital cameras, DSLR cameras and relatively sophisticated purpose built high quality CCD cameras and CMOS cameras.

Most amateur astronomers work at visible wavelengths, but a small minority experiment with wavelengths outside the visible spectrum. An early pioneer of radio astronomy was Grote Reber, an amateur astronomer who constructed the first purpose-built radio telescope in the late 1930s to follow up on the discovery of radio wavelength emissions from space by Karl Jansky. Non-visual amateur astronomy includes the use of infrared filters on conventional telescopes, and also the use of radio telescopes. Some amateur astronomers use home-made radio telescopes, while others use radio telescopes that were originally built for astronomical research but have since been made available for use by amateurs. The One-Mile Telescope is one such example.

Sidewalk astronomy — the practice of setting up telescopes for public viewing — aims at educating and engaging the public with astronomy. In addition to increasing interest in astronomy and science in general, sidewalk astronomy raises awareness of light pollution issues.

== History ==
The history of amateur astronomy dates back to early civilizations where the practice of observing celestial objects became a device that assisted in predicting atmospheric patterns to help enable proactive decisions on developing agriculture. Civilizations like the Babylonians, Chaldeans, and ancient Egyptians created calendars, predicted eclipse dates, and separated day and night through ancient amateur astronomers using simple tools and the naked eye to track celestial bodies. Popularizing in the mid-nineteenth century, amateur astronomy gained millions of participants evolving from wealthy "Grand Amateurs" and the more accessible equipment after World War II.

== Common tools ==
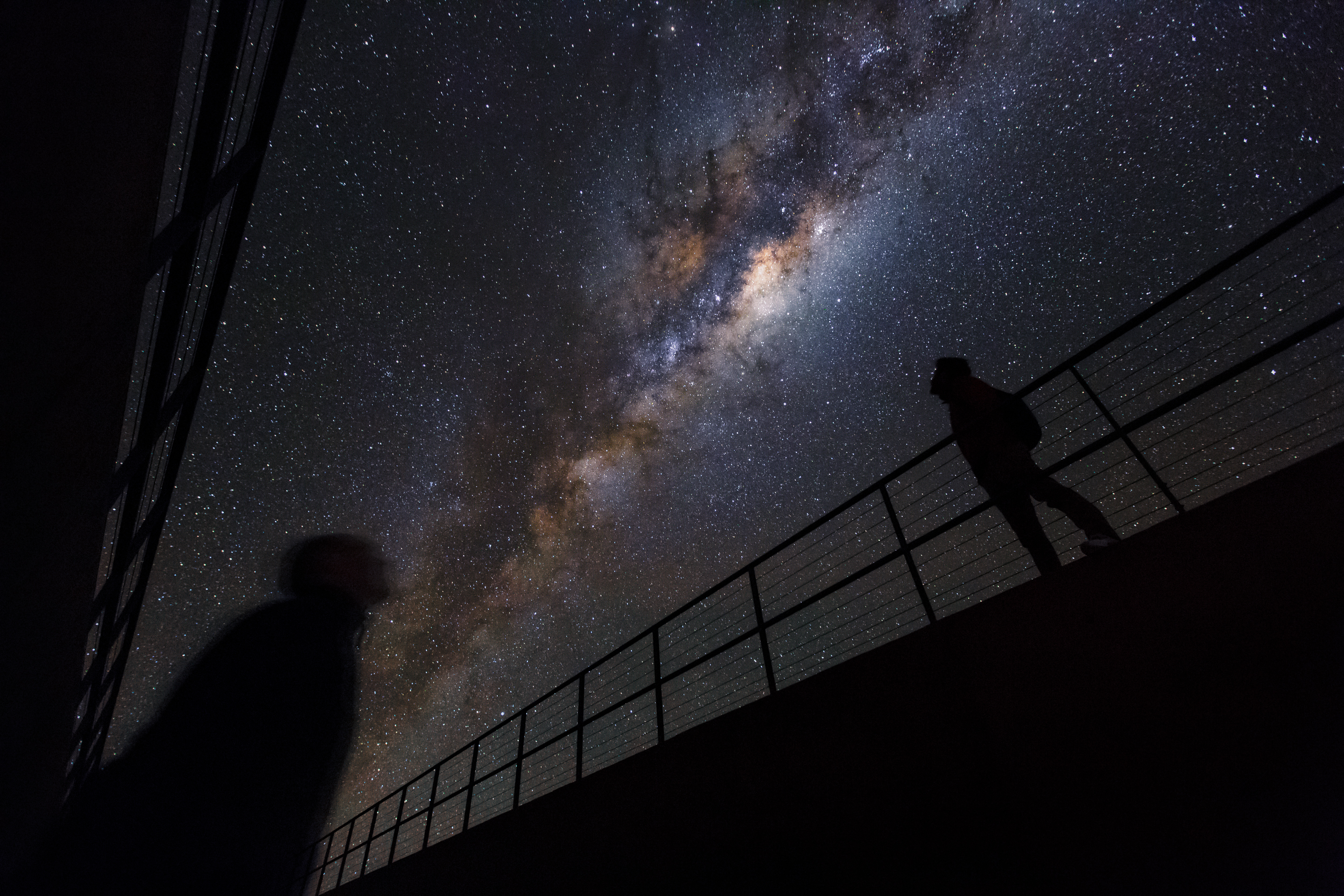
Places like Paranal Observatory offer crystal clear skies for observing astronomical objects with or without instruments.

Amateur astronomers use a range of instruments to study the sky, depending on a combination of their interests and resources. Methods include simply looking at the night sky with the naked eye, using binoculars, and using a variety of optical telescopes of varying power and quality, as well as additional sophisticated equipment, such as cameras, to study light from the sky in both the visual and non-visual parts of the spectrum. To further improve studying the visual and non-visual part of the spectrum, amateur astronomers go to rural areas to get away from light pollution. Commercial telescopes are available, new and used, but it is also common for amateur astronomers to build (or commission the building of) their own custom telescopes. Some people even focus on amateur telescope making as their primary interest within the hobby of amateur astronomy. More advanced methods of locating objects in the sky include telescope mounts with setting circles, which allow pointing to targets in the sky using celestial coordinates, and GOTO telescopes, which are fully automated telescopes that are capable of locating objects on demand (having first been calibrated).

=== Simple equipment ===
Although specialized and experienced amateur astronomers tend to acquire more specialized and powerful equipment over time, relatively simple equipment is often preferred for certain tasks. Binoculars, for instance, although generally of lower power than the majority of telescopes, also tend to provide a wider field of view and are more portable, which is preferable for looking at some objects in the night sky. Recent smartphone models have a "night mode" option when taking pictures that allows users to increase exposure, which refers to the period of time the picture is being taken. This optimizes focus on light in the frame which is why it is used primarily at night.

=== Beginner telescopes ===
Beginner telescopes, commonly used by amateur astronomers to observe celestial objects in more detail, are a more powerful tool compared to other amateur equipment such as binoculars. Amateur astronomers often use four main types of optical telescopes: reflectors, refractors, hybrid, and Dobsonian telescopes. Reflector telescopes utilize mirrors while refractors use lenses, these combine to create the hybrid telescope, which uses a combination of both mirrors and lenses. The Dobsonian is a type of reflector with the addition of a base or mount.

GOTO telescopes have become more popular since the 1980s as technology has improved and prices have been reduced. With these computer-driven telescopes, the user typically enters the name of the item of interest and the mechanics of the telescope point the telescope towards that item automatically. They have several notable advantages for amateur astronomers intent on research. For example, GOTO telescopes tend to be faster for locating items of interest than star hopping, allowing more time for studying of the object. GOTO also allows manufacturers to add equatorial tracking to mechanically simpler alt-azimuth telescope mounts, allowing them to produce an overall less expensive product. GOTO telescopes usually have to be calibrated using alignment stars to provide accurate tracking and positioning. Several telescope manufacturers have recently developed telescope systems that are calibrated with the use of built-in GPS, decreasing the time it takes to set up a telescope at the start of an observing session.

=== Remote-controlled telescopes ===
With the development of fast internet in the last part of the 20th century along with advances in computer controlled telescope mounts and CCD cameras, "remote telescope" astronomy is now a viable means for amateur astronomers not aligned with major telescope facilities to partake in research and deep sky imaging. This enables anyone to control a telescope a great distance away in a dark location. The observer can image through the telescope using CCD cameras. The digital data collected by the telescope is then transmitted and displayed to the user by means of the Internet. An example of a digital remote telescope operation for public use via the Internet is the Bareket Observatory, and there are telescope farms in New Mexico, Australia and Atacama in Chile.

=== Star charts ===
Amateur astronomers also use star charts that, depending on experience and intentions, may range from simple planispheres through to star atlases with detailed charts of the entire night sky. A range of astronomy software is also available and used by amateur astronomers, including software that generates maps of the sky, software to assist with astrophotography, observation scheduling software, and software to perform various calculations pertaining to astronomical phenomena.

=== Setting circles ===
Setting circles are angular measurement scales that can be placed on the two main rotation axes of some telescopes. Since the widespread adoption of digital setting circles, any classical engraved setting circle is now specifically identified as an "analog setting circle" (ASC). By knowing the coordinates of an object (usually given in equatorial coordinates), the telescope user can use the setting circle to align (i.e., point) the telescope in the appropriate direction before looking through its eyepiece. A computerized setting circle is called a "digital setting circle" (DSC). Although digital setting circles can be used to display a telescope's RA and Dec coordinates, they are not simply a digital read-out of what can be seen on the telescope's analog setting circles. As with go-to telescopes, digital setting circle computers (commercial names include Argo Navis, Sky Commander, and NGC Max) contain databases of tens of thousands of celestial objects and projections of planet positions.

To find a celestial object in a telescope equipped with a DSC computer, one does not need to look up the specific RA and Dec coordinates in a book or other resource, and then adjust the telescope to those numerical readings. Rather, the object is chosen from the electronic database, which causes distance values and arrow markers to appear in the display that indicate the distance and direction to move the telescope. The telescope is moved until the two angular distance values reach zero, indicating that the telescope is properly aligned. When both the RA and Dec axes are thus "zeroed out", the object should be in the eyepiece. Many DSCs, like go-to systems, can also work in conjunction with laptop sky programs.

Computerized systems provide the further advantage of computing coordinate precession. Traditional printed sources are subtitled by the epoch year, which refers to the positions of celestial objects at a given time to the nearest year (e.g., J2005, J2007). Most such printed sources have been updated for intervals of only about every fifty years (e.g., J1900, J1950, J2000). Computerized sources, on the other hand, are able to calculate the right ascension and declination of the "epoch of date" to the exact instant of observation.

=== Observing logs ===
Amateur astronomers often like to keep records of their observations, which usually takes the form of an observing log. Observing logs typically record details about which objects were observed and when, as well as describing the details that were seen. Sketching is sometimes used within logs, and photographic records of observations have also been used in recent times. The information gathered is used to help studies and interactions between amateur astronomers in yearly gatherings. Although not professional information or credible, it is a way for the hobby lovers to share their new sightings and experiences.

=== Mobile apps ===
The advent of mobile applications for use in smartphones has led to the creation of many dedicated apps. These apps allow any user to easily locate celestial objects of interest by simply pointing the smartphone device in that direction in the sky. These apps make use of the inbuilt hardware in the phone, such as GPS location and gyroscope. Useful information about the pointed object like celestial coordinates, the name of the object, its constellation, etc. are provided for a quick reference. Some paid versions give more information. These apps are gradually getting into regular use during observing, for the alignment process of telescopes.

=== The internet ===
The popularity of imaging among amateurs has led to large numbers of web sites being written by individuals about their images and equipment. Much of the social interaction of amateur astronomy occurs on mailing lists or discussion groups. Discussion group servers host numerous astronomy lists. A great deal of the commerce of amateur astronomy, the buying and selling of equipment, occurs online. Many amateurs use online tools to plan their nightly observing sessions, using tools such as the Clear Sky Chart.

== Common techniques ==
While a number of interesting celestial objects are readily identified by the naked eye, sometimes with the aid of a star chart, many others are so faint or inconspicuous that technical means are necessary to locate them. Although many methods are used in amateur astronomy, most are techniques that are adaptations of core practices.

=== Star hopping ===
Star hopping is a method often used by amateur astronomers with low-tech equipment such as binoculars or a manually driven telescope. It involves the use of maps (or memory) to locate known landmark stars, and "hopping" between them, often with the aid of a finderscope. Because of its simplicity, star hopping is a very common method for finding objects that are close to naked-eye stars.

== Imaging techniques ==
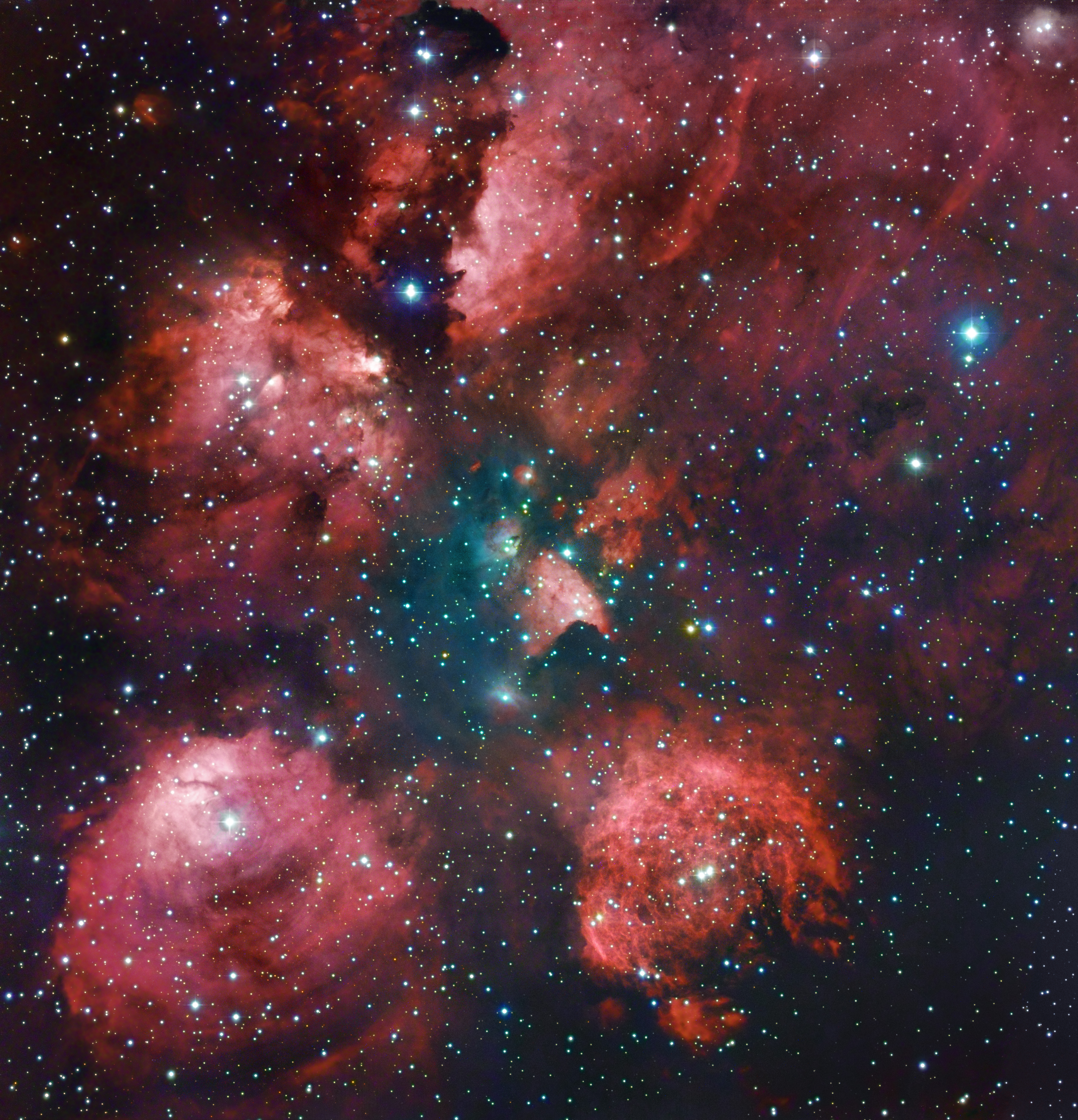
An image of the Cat's Paw Nebula created combining the work of professional and amateur astronomers. The image is the combination of the 2.2-metre MPG/ESO telescope of the La Silla Observatory in Chile and a 0.4-meter amateur telescope.

Amateur astronomers engage in many imaging techniques including film, DSLR, LRGB, and CCD astrophotography. DSLR (digital single-lens reflex) cameras, such as the Canon EOS 60D camera, provide a cost-effective, consumer-grade alternative to CCDs, capable of achieving ideal outcomes for MAD (median absolute deviation). LRGB produce high-quality, cleaner images, allowing amateur astronomers to acquire fine color detail by combining a RGB color images and greyscale images. CCD cameras are widely used due to their fast exposures, sensitivity, dynamic range, less hardware, and linear response, allowing amateur astronomers to capture vague celestial objects. Because CCD imagers are linear, image processing may be used to subtract away the effects of light pollution, which has increased the popularity of astrophotography in urban areas. Narrowband filters may also be used to minimize light pollution.

== Light pollution ==
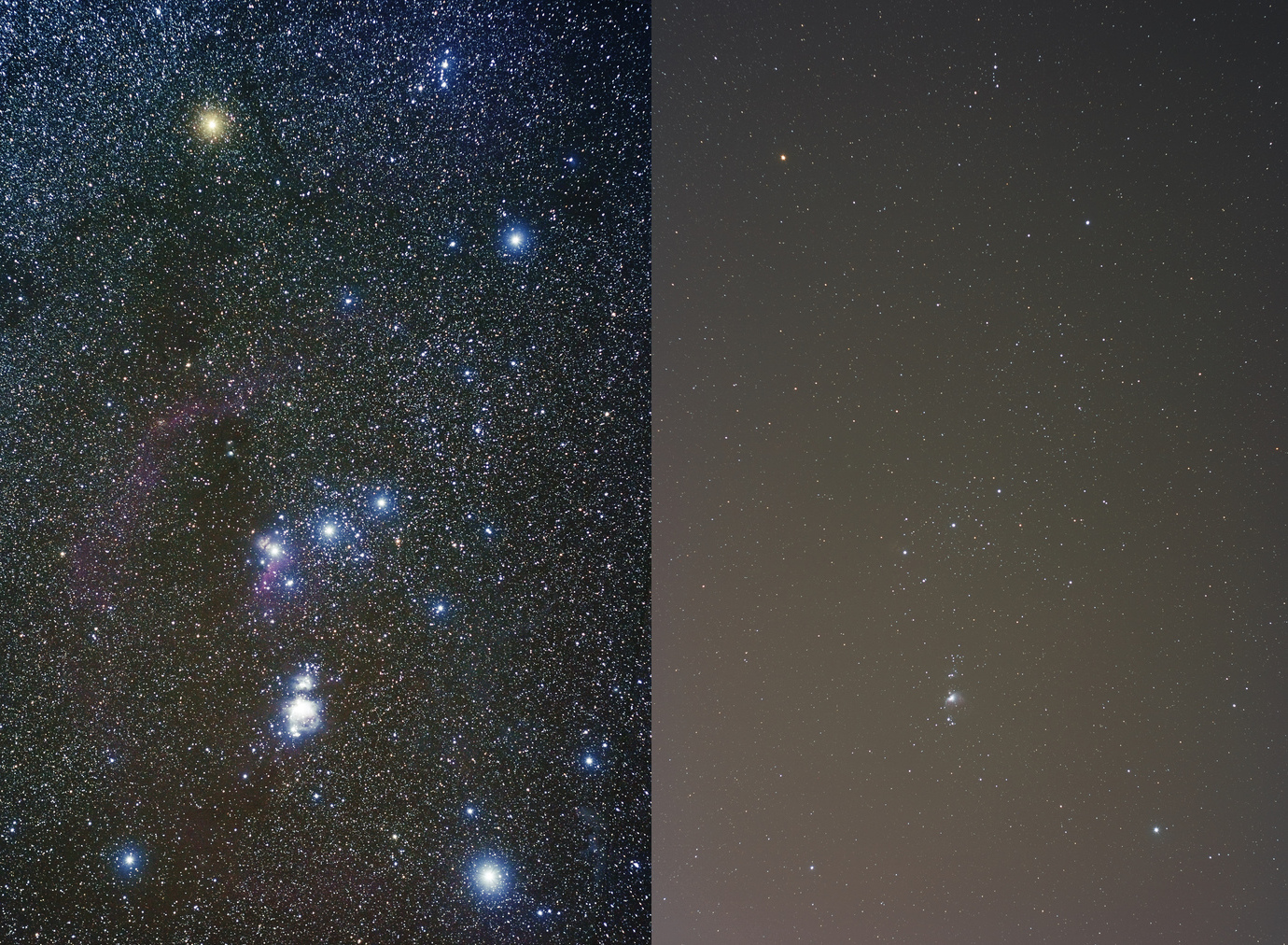
This image contains two side-by-side pictures of the night sky comparing the effects of light pollution on the visibility of celestial objects.

In recent times, increasing light pollution, radio interference, and satellite activity have had a negative effect on the outcomes of amateur astronomers' observations and work, limiting their potential contributions or findings of scientific discoveries. Urban lighting has had particularly detrimental effects on amateur astronomers by light trespass compromising their observatories and ruining the correct lighting conditions for photographic observations.

== Scientific research ==
Although not the main goal of amateur astronomers, scientific research is possible, and many amateurs successfully contribute to the knowledge base of astronomy. Astronomy is sometimes promoted as one of the few remaining sciences for which amateurs can still contribute useful data. To recognize this, the Astronomical Society of the Pacific annually gives Amateur Achievement Awards for significant contributions to astronomy by amateurs.

The majority of scientific contributions by amateur astronomers are in the area of data collection. In particular, this applies where large numbers of amateur astronomers with small telescopes are more effective than the relatively small number of large telescopes that are available to professional astronomers. Several organizations, such as the American Association of Variable Star Observers and the British Astronomical Association, exist to help coordinate these contributions.

Amateur astronomers often contribute toward activities such as monitoring the changes in brightness of variable stars and supernovae, helping to track asteroids, and observing occultations to determine both the shape of asteroids and the shape of the terrain on the apparent edge of the Moon as seen from Earth. With more advanced equipment, but still cheap in comparison to professional setups, amateur astronomers can measure the light spectrum emitted from astronomical objects, which can yield high-quality scientific data if the measurements are performed with due care. A relatively recent role for amateur astronomers is searching for overlooked phenomena (e.g., Kreutz Sungrazers) in the vast libraries of digital images and other data captured by Earth and space based observatories, much of which is available over the Internet.

In the past and present, amateur astronomers have played a major role in discovering new comets. The introduction of projects such as the Lincoln Near-Earth Asteroid Research and Near Earth Asteroid Tracking projects has meant that most comets are now discovered by automated systems long before it is possible for amateurs to see them.

== Societies ==
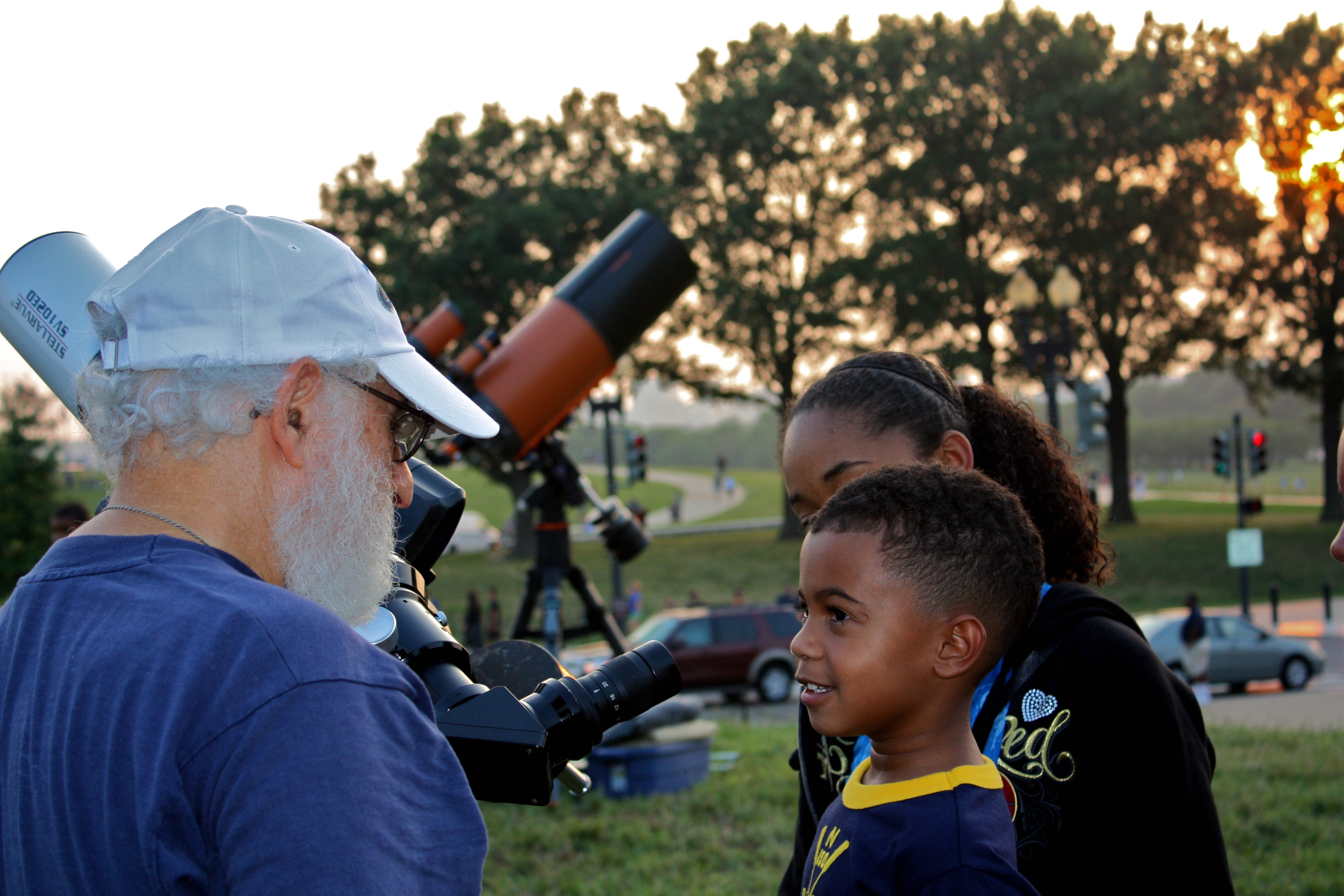
Amateur astronomy groups are often involved in outreach to introduce astronomy to the general public

There are a large number of amateur astronomical societies around the world, that serve as a meeting point for those interested in amateur astronomy. Members range from active observers with their own equipment to "armchair astronomers" who are simply interested in the topic. Societies range widely in their goals and activities, which may depend on a variety of factors such as geographic spread, local circumstances, size, and membership. For example, a small local society located in dark countryside may focus on practical observing and star parties, whereas a large one based in a major city might have numerous members but be limited by light pollution and thus hold regular indoor meetings with guest speakers instead. Major national or international societies generally publish their own academic journal or newsletter, and some hold large multi-day meetings akin to a scientific conference or convention. They may also have sections devoted to particular topics, such as lunar observation or amateur telescope making.

== Notable contributions by amateur astronomers ==
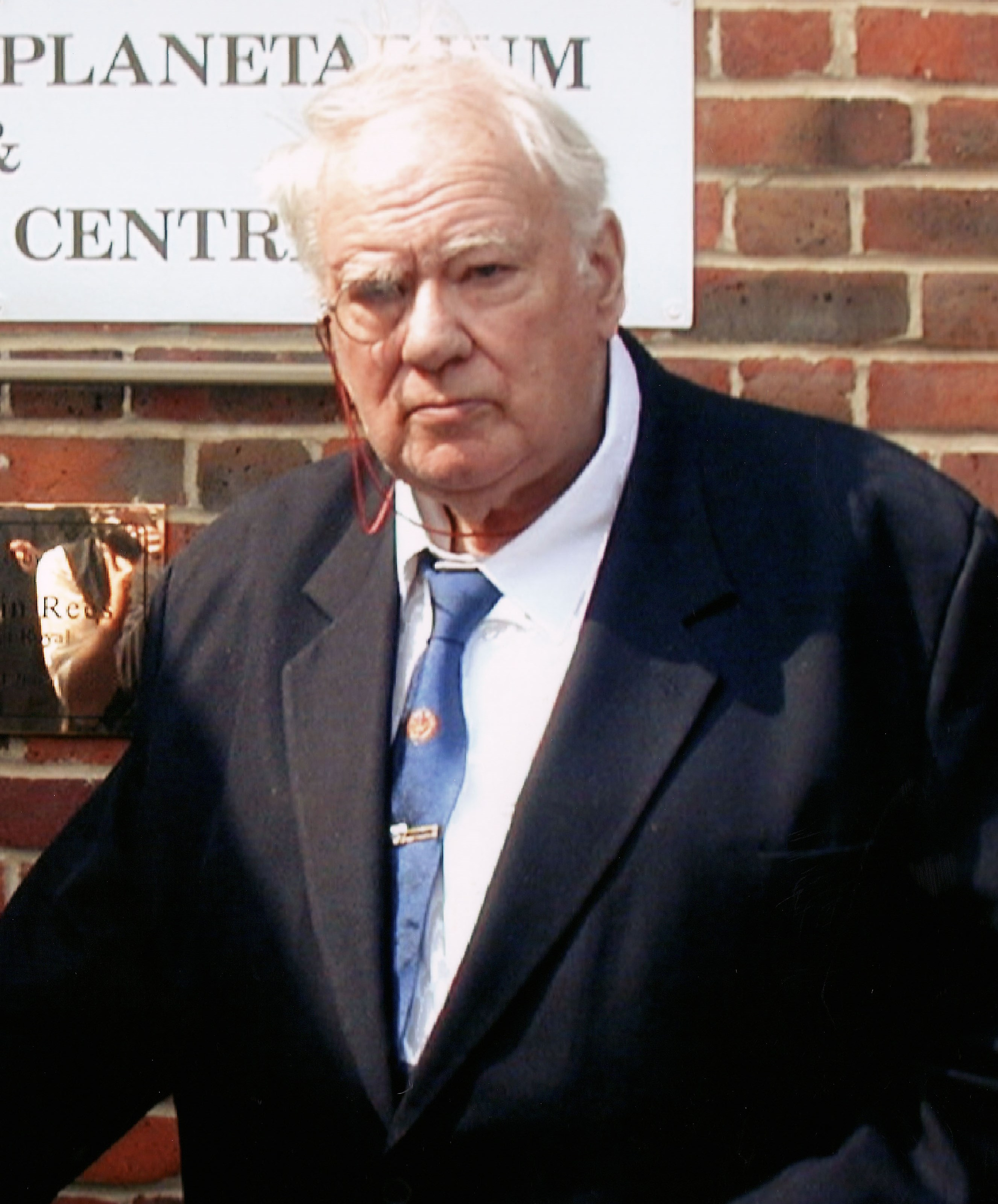
Sir Patrick Moore was one of the world's leading popularisers of astronomy.

There have been many significant scientific, technological, and cultural contributions made by amateur astronomers:

- George Alcock, one of the most successful visual discoverers of comets and novae.
- John E. Bortle, authored "Comet Digest" in Sky and Telescope magazine and the monthly AAVSO circular for the American Association of Variable Star Observers. Created the Bortle scale to quantify the darkness of the night sky.
- Robert Burnham Jr. (1931–1993), author of the Celestial Handbook.
- Andrew Ainslie Common (1841–1903), built his own very large reflecting telescopes and demonstrated that photography could record astronomical features invisible to the human eye.
- Robert E. Cox (1917–1989), who conducted the "Gleanings for ATMs" column in Sky & Telescope magazine for 21 years.
- John Dobson (1915–2014), promoter of astronomy whose name is associated with the Dobsonian telescope.
- Robert Owen Evans (1937–2022) was an amateur astronomer who currently holds the all-time record for visual discoveries of supernovae.
- Giuseppe Donatiello, discovered twelve nearby dwarf galaxies in the Local Volume including the first galaxy to be named after its non-professional discoverer and three ultrafaint dwarf galaxies in the Local Group (Pisces VII, Pegasus V/Andromeda XXXIV and Andromeda XXXVI).
- Will Hay, comedian and actor, who discovered a white spot on Saturn.
- Walter Scott Houston (1912–1993) who wrote the "Deep-Sky Wonders" column in Sky & Telescope magazine for almost 50 years.
- Albert G. Ingalls (1888–1958), editor of Amateur Telescope Making, Vols. 1–3 and "The Amateur Scientist".
- David H. Levy discovered or co-discovered 22 comets including Comet Shoemaker-Levy 9, the most for any individual.
- Sir Patrick Moore (1923–2012), presenter of the BBC's long-running The Sky at Night and author of many books on astronomy.
- Jack Newton (1942-2025), Canadian developer of cold camera astrophotography; founder of the dark sky Arizona Sky Village.
- Russell W. Porter (1871–1949) founded Stellafane and has been referred to as a "founder" of amateur telescope making.
- Grote Reber (1911–2002), pioneer of radio astronomy constructing the first purpose-built radio telescope and conducted the first sky survey in the radio frequency.

=== Citizen science projects ===
Amateur astronomers and other non-professionals make contributions through ongoing citizen science projects:

- XO Project, an international team of amateur and professional astronomers tasked with identifying extrasolar planets.
- Many amateur astronomers contribute to scientific discoveries as part of the citizen science Zooniverse project.

== Prizes recognizing amateur astronomers ==
- Amateur Achievement Award of Astronomical Society of the Pacific
- Chambliss Amateur Achievement Award

== See also ==
- Caldwell catalogue – A list of astronomical objects for observation by amateur astronomers compiled by Sir Patrick Caldwell-Moore.
- Clear Sky Chart – Weather forecasts designed for amateur astronomers.
- List of astronomical societies
- List of telescope parts and construction
- Messier catalogue – A set of astronomical objects catalogued by the French astronomer Charles Messier in 1771, which is still used by many amateurs as an observing list.
- Observation
- Observational astronomy
- School Astronomical Olympiad by Correspondence
- Sidewalk astronomy
- Star party
