= Andromeda II =

Dwarf spheroidal galaxy in the constellation Andromeda

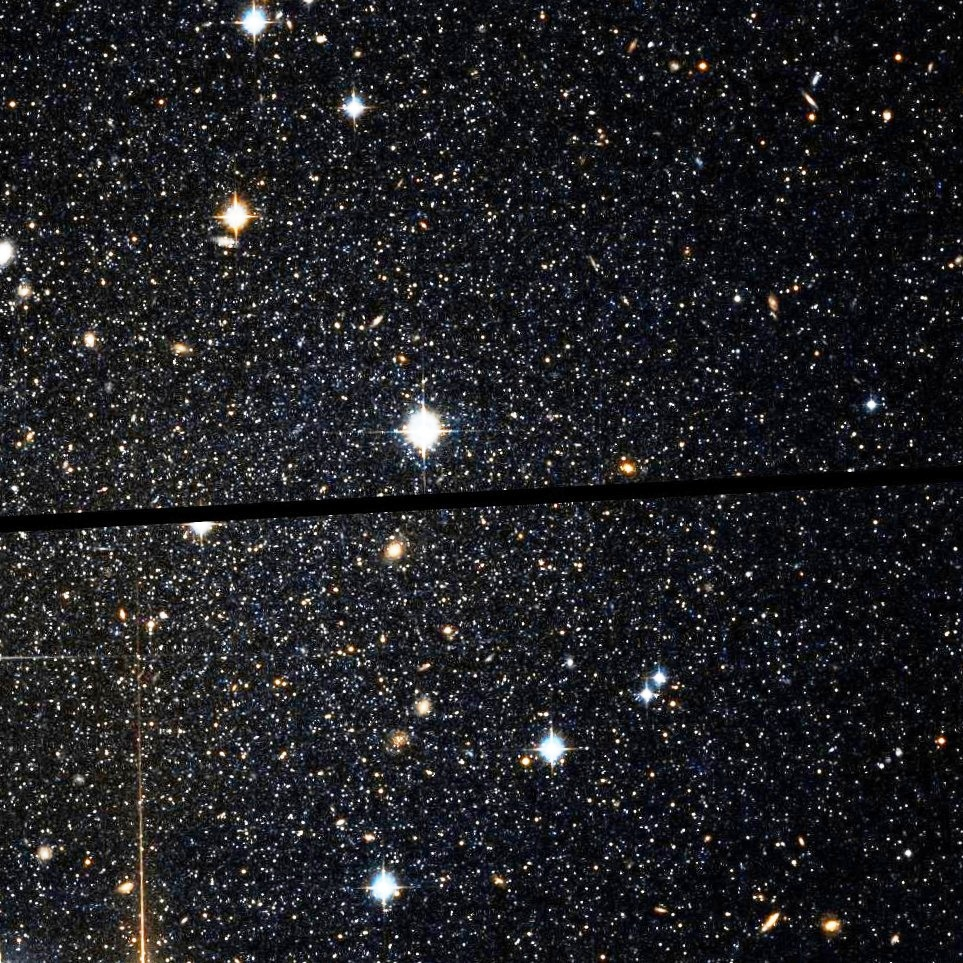
- Andromeda II, as taken by the Hubble Space Telescope

Observation data (J2000 epoch)
- Constellation: Pisces
- Right ascension: 01^{h} 16^{m} 29.8^{s}
- Declination: +33° 25′ 09″
- Redshift: −188 ± 3 km/s
- Distance: 2.22 ± 0.07 Mly (680 ± 20 kpc)
- Apparent magnitude (V): 13.5

Characteristics
- Type: dSph
- Apparent size (V): 3.6′ × 2.52′
- Notable features: Unlikely satellite galaxy of M31

Other designations
- Andromeda II Dwarf Spheroidal, PGC 4601, And II

Andromeda II (And II) is a dwarf spheroidal galaxy about 2.22 Mly away in the constellation Pisces. While part of the Local Group, it does not lie close enough to be a satellite of the Triangulum Galaxy. It is more likely to be a satellite of Andromeda Galaxy, due to its higher mass.

It was discovered by Sidney Van den Bergh in a survey of photographic plates taken with the Palomar 48-inch (1.2 m) Schmidt telescope in 1970 and 1971, together with Andromeda I, Andromeda III, and the presumable non- or background galaxy Andromeda IV.

== Nomenclature ==
Andromeda II has also been given the alias Pisces II by Martin et al. (2009), who also proposed aliases for several other satellite galaxies of the Andromeda Galaxy However, that name was later used by a different group unaware of these names, for a separate galaxy.

== Spectra observations ==
Using the Keck telescope, Côté et al. 1999 observed spectra for seven stars inside Andromeda II. From this data, they found an average velocity V_{r} of −188 ± 3 km/s and velocity dispersion of 9.2 ± 2.6 km/s. This gives a mass to light ratio of M/L_{v} of 21^{+14}_{−10} solar units which implies that And II contains a significant amount of dark matter. Also in 1999, Côté, Oke, & Cohen used the Keck to measure the spectra of 42 red giants. From this, they deduced an average metallicity of <[Fe/H]> = −1.47 ± 0.19 and a dispersion of 0.35 ± 0.10 dex.

In 1999, Da Costa et al. studied the color-magnitude diagram of And II and discovered that most of stars in And II have ages between 6 and 9 Gyr. However, the observation of RR Lyrae variables and blue horizontal-branch stars demonstrates the existence of a population segment with an age greater than 10 Gyr. And II differs from And I in that it does not show a radial gradient in horizontal-branch morphology. Additionally, the dispersion in abundance is significantly larger in And II as compared to And I. This implies that these two dwarf spheroidal companions to the Andromeda galaxy have very different evolutionary histories. This raises the question of whether there is a correlation between a radial horizontal-branch gradient and the metallicity dispersion between dwarf spheroidal galaxies.

== History ==
And II appears to be in the possession of a stellar stream, a feature that is indicative of a merger event in the past. The characteristics of And II can best be explained by the merger of two disky dwarf galaxies, some 5 billion years ago.

== See also ==
- List of Andromeda's satellite galaxies
