= WXP =

WXP may refer to:

- Windows XP, computer operating system
- WXP (software), weather data software
