= Giuseppe Donatiello =

Italian amateur astronomer (b. 1967)

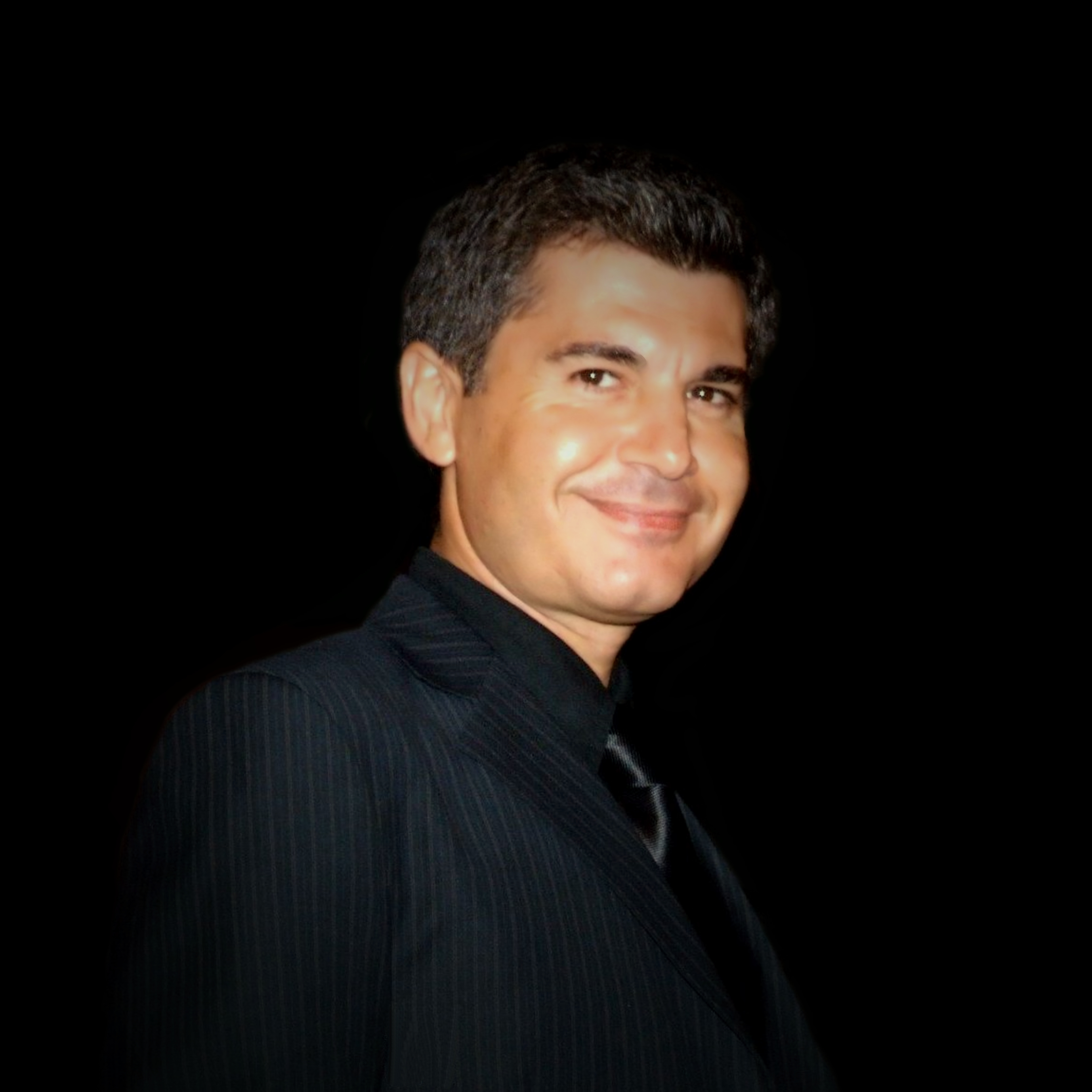
- Giuseppe Donatiello in 2017
- Born: December 14, 1967 (age 57); Italy
- Occupation: Amateur astronomer

Notes
- Discoverer of twelve nearby dwarf galaxies in the Local Volume

Giuseppe Donatiello (born 14 December, 1967) is an Italian amateur astronomer. He is known for discovering twelve nearby dwarf galaxies in the Local Volume, including three in the Local Group. He is the principal investigator and coordinator of the National Deep Sky Research Section of the Italian Amateur Astronomers Union.

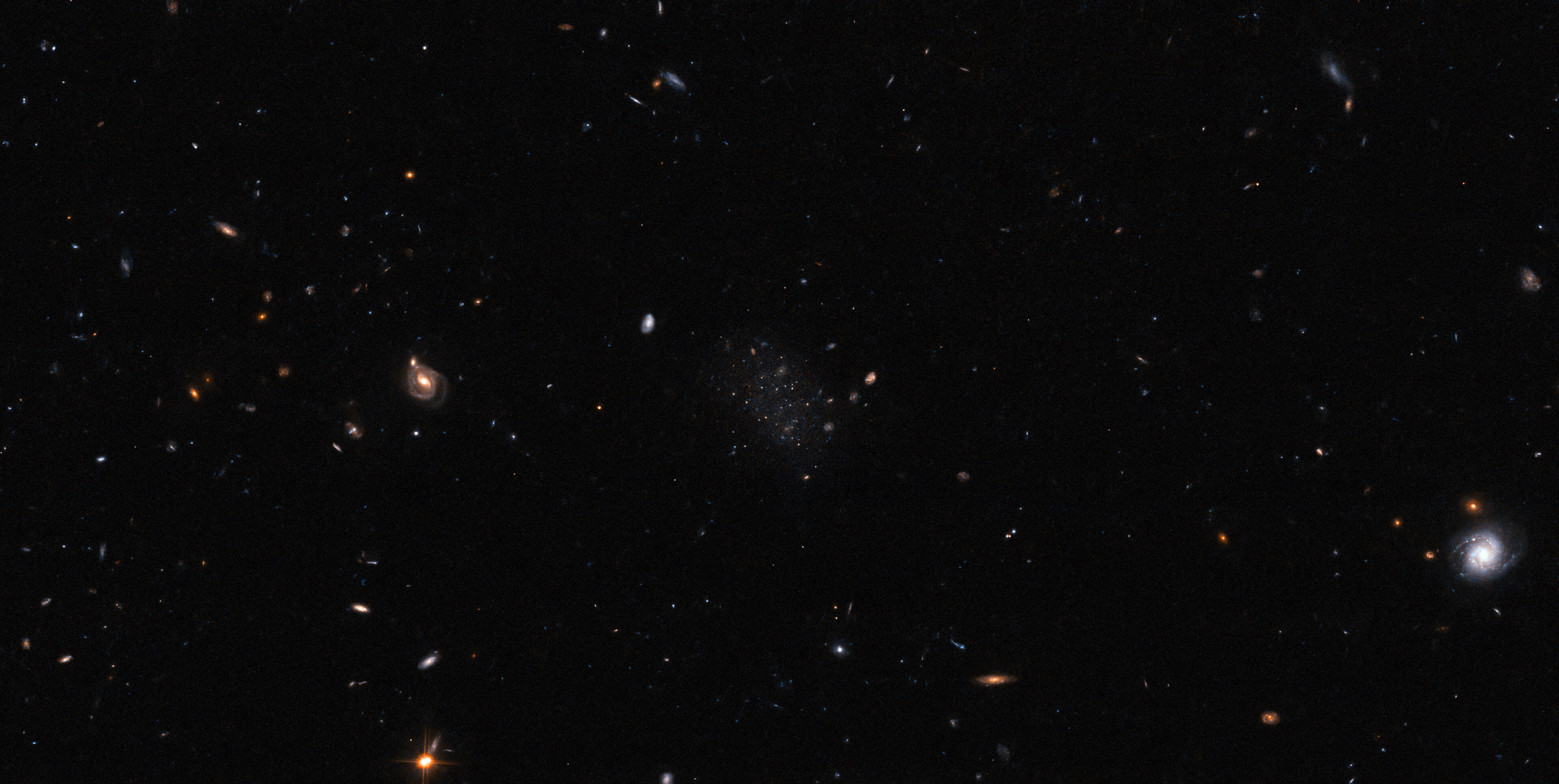
Donatiello II dwarf galaxy imaged by the Hubble Space Telescope.

== Contributions ==
Donatiello has identified 12 different galaxies within the Local Volume since 2016, when he discovered a dwarf galaxy 10 million light years away in the constellation of Andromeda; it was named Donatiello I and is the first galaxy to be named after an amateur astronomer.

In 2020, he discovered the ultra-faint dwarf galaxy named Pisces VII/Triangulum III, identified as a possible satellite galaxy of the Triangulum Galaxy (Messier 33 or NGC 598). Pisces VII is the first Local Group galaxy to be discovered by an amateur astronomer

Then in 2021, Donatiello discovered three new satellite galaxies of the Sculptor Galaxy (NGC 253); all were later observed and confirmed as satellites of the Sculptor galaxy by the Hubble Space Telescope and named Donatiello II, III, and IV as his namesake.

In 2022, he discovered an ultra-faint dwarf satellite galaxy of the Andromeda Galaxy (Messier 31 or NGC 224), which was named Pegasus V/Andromeda XXXIV (Peg V/And XXXIV). Pegasus V was later found to be particularly ancient, and serves as a potential fossil of early star formation.

In 2024, the discovery of five more satellite galaxies of the Sculptor Galaxy was announced; these new objects were named Donatiello V, VI, VII, VIII and IX.

In 2025, the discovery of a giant stellar stream in the spiral galaxy Messier 61 was reported. Although scientific confirmation came from images from the Vera C. Rubin Observatory, Donatiello had already reported its presence in 2020 in his own ultra-deep images.

In 2026, the discovery of Andromeda XXXVI, another ultra-faint dwarf galaxy of the Andromeda Galaxy, was announced.

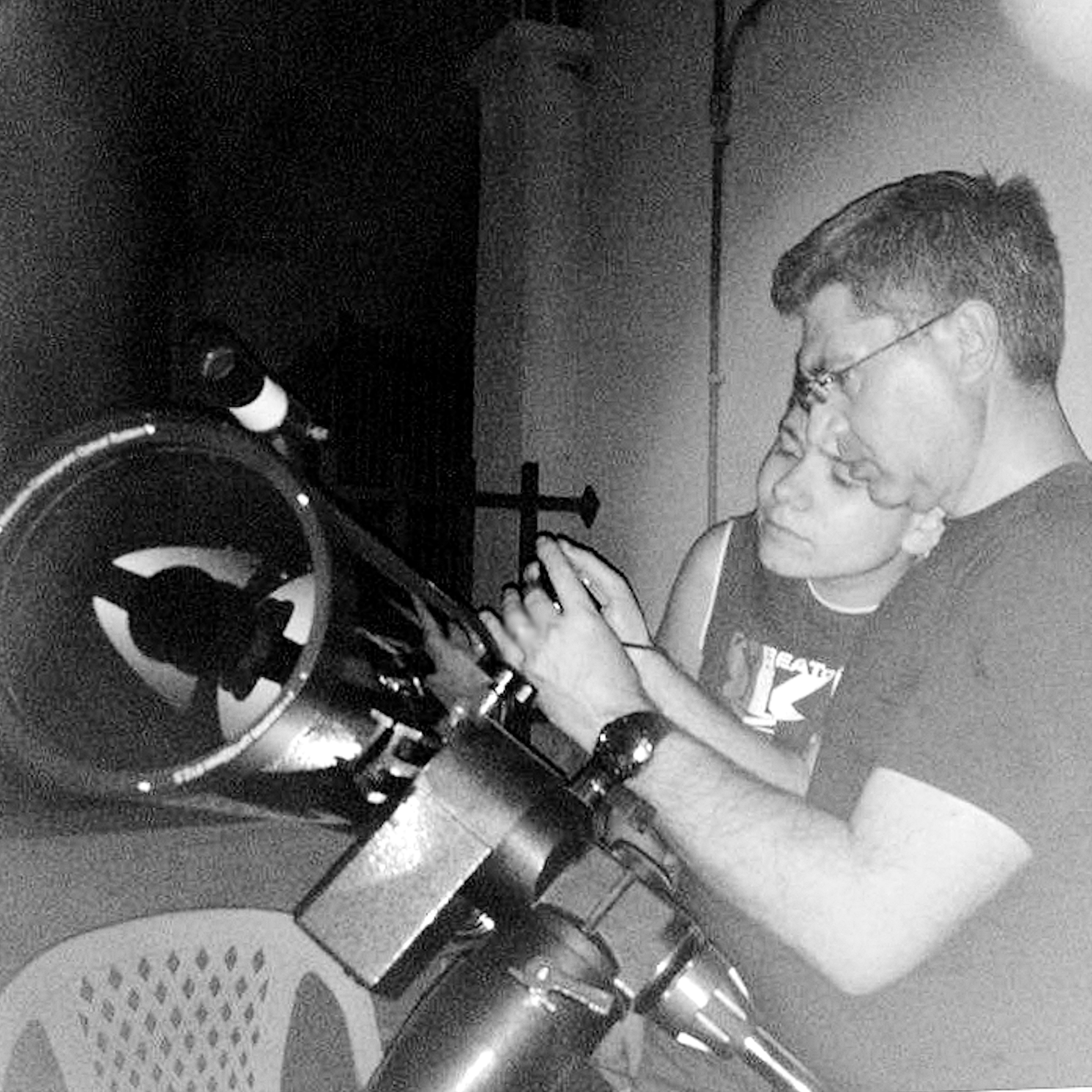
Night-vision image of Donatiello and his son using a Maksutov-Cassegrain reflecting telescope on 21 June, 2016.

Donatiello has also discovered some candidates for potential planetary nebulae and the participation in the discovery and analysis of several dozen stellar streams.

== See also ==
- Dwarf galaxy
- Donatiello I
- Pisces VII/Triangulum III
- Pegasus V/Andromeda XXXIV
- Sculptor Galaxy
- Amateur astronomy
- List of astronomical objects named after people
