= Donatiello I =

Dwarf spheroidal galaxy located in the constellation Andromeda

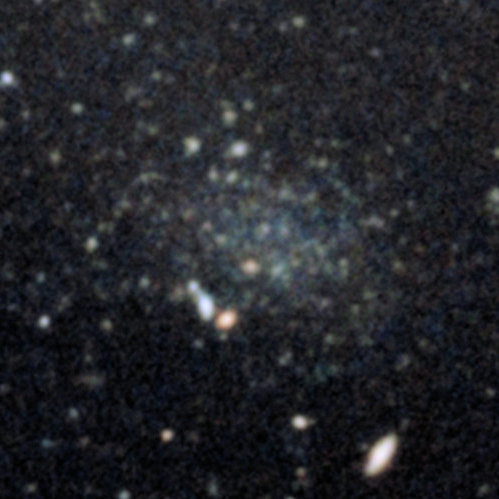
- Long-exposure photograph of Donatiello I (Note: Photograph taken with the Device Optimized for the Low Resolution (DOLoRes) instrument on the Galileo National Telescope, using 35 exposures lasting 180 seconds each, with two different optical filters, on 27 November 2016.)

Observation data (J2000 epoch)
- Constellation: Andromeda
- Right ascension: 01^{h} 11^{m} 40.37^{s}
- Declination: +34° 36′ 3.2″
- Distance: 2.5−3.5 Mpc
- Absolute magnitude (V): −8.3±0.3

Characteristics
- Type: Dwarf spheroidal
- Apparent size (V): 0′.96 ± 0.30
- Half-light radius (physical): 442±157 pc

Donatiello I, also known as Mirach's Goblin, is a dwarf spheroidal galaxy in the constellation Andromeda, located between 8.1 and 11.4 million light-years from Earth. It is a possible satellite galaxy of the dwarf lenticular galaxy NGC 404, "Mirach's Ghost", which is situated 60 arcminutes away. It is otherwise one of the most isolated dwarf spheroidal galaxies known, being separated from NGC 404 by around 211,000 light-years. The galaxy is named after its discoverer, Italian amateur astronomer and astrophotographer Giuseppe Donatiello, who sighted the galaxy in a 2016 review of his archival long exposures from 2010 and 2013. Follow-up observations with the Roque de los Muchachos Observatory led to a scientific paper on its discovery being published in December 2018.

== Nomenclature ==
Donatiello I is named after its discoverer, Italian amateur astronomer and astrophotographer Giuseppe Donatiello, and is abbreviated to "Do I". The galaxy's nickname, "Mirach's Goblin", is a reference to the nearby dwarf lenticular galaxy NGC 404, with which it may be physically associated. NGC 404 is nicknamed "Mirach's Ghost" due to its proximity to the second magnitude star Mirach.

== Characteristics ==
Donatiello I is a dwarf spheroidal galaxy at an estimated distance from Earth between 2.5 and 3.5 megaparsecs, or 8.1 and 11.4 million light-years, outside the Local Group. Its luminosity is around 200,000 times greater than that of the Sun, with an absolute magnitude of around −8.3 and a surface brightness of 26 magnitudes per square arcsecond. Its effective radius is roughly estimated to be 400 parsecs, while its ellipticity is around 0.7. Donatiello I is one of the most isolated dwarf spheroidals known, and is a possible satellite galaxy of its nearest neighbor, NGC 404, which is located around 65 kiloparsecs away from it, or 211,000 light-years. (Note: Surmised from NGC 404's tip of the red-giant branch (TRGB) distance from Earth, which is 3.1 megaparsecs, Donatiello I and NGC 404 are separated by 65 kiloparsecs.) Donatiello I could have either been involved in, or affected by, a possible merger between NGC 404 and an irregular dwarf galaxy around 900 million years ago. Like similar dwarf spheroidal galaxies orbiting the Milky Way Galaxy and Andromeda Galaxy, Donatiello I is populated with metal-poor red dwarfs, with no active star formation occurring.

== Observation ==
Location of Donatiello I in the constellation Andromeda (circled)

Donatiello I lies in the constellation Andromeda, at a right ascension of 01^{h} 11^{m} 40.37^{s} and declination of +34° 36′ 3.2″, in the J2000 epoch. In the galactic coordinate system, it is located at a longitude of 127.65° and a latitude of −28.08°. It is situated 60 arcminutes away from Mirach, and 72.4 arcminutes away from NGC 404. Its apparent diameter is roughly 60 arcseconds, (Note: Surmised from its apparent radius of 0′.48 ± 0.15, Donatiello I's apparent diameter from Earth is 0′.96 ± 0.30, which is equal to 57.6±18 seconds of arc.) while its surface brightness is around 27 magnitudes per square arcsecond. Amateur astronomer and astrophotographer Giuseppe Donatiello first sighted the galaxy in 2016 while surveying an archived 6000-second exposure of an area around the Andromeda Galaxy taken on 5–7 November 2010 and 5 October 2013 in the Pollino National Park, with a custom-built 12.7 centimetre telescope. Donatiello intended to capture stellar streams and dwarf galaxies around Andromeda that had been reported at the time.

The discovery was corroborated using images from the Sloan Digital Sky Survey's ninth data release, which showed a faint object in the same area, and was announced by Donatiello on 23 September 2016, via a post on Facebook. Donatiello collaborated with a team led by David Martínez-Delgado of Heidelberg University, after Delgado had come across Donatiello's post, to make further observations of the galaxy with the Roque de los Muchachos Observatory's Galileo National Telescope and Gran Telescopio Canarias in La Palma, Spain, on 27 November 2016. The team's scientific paper on the discovery and their follow-up observations was submitted to the journal Astronomy & Astrophysics in April 2018, and was accepted and published in December 2018, with a preprint released on arXiv in October. Further detailed observations with the Hubble Space Telescope have been suggested by the paper's authors as a way to better determine the galaxy's distance from Earth and its relationship with NGC 404, along with Donatiello I's size and mass.

== See also ==
- List of galaxies named after people
- List of nearest galaxies
