= Pegasus V =

Dwarf satellite galaxy of Andromeda

Pegasus V/Andromeda XXXIV
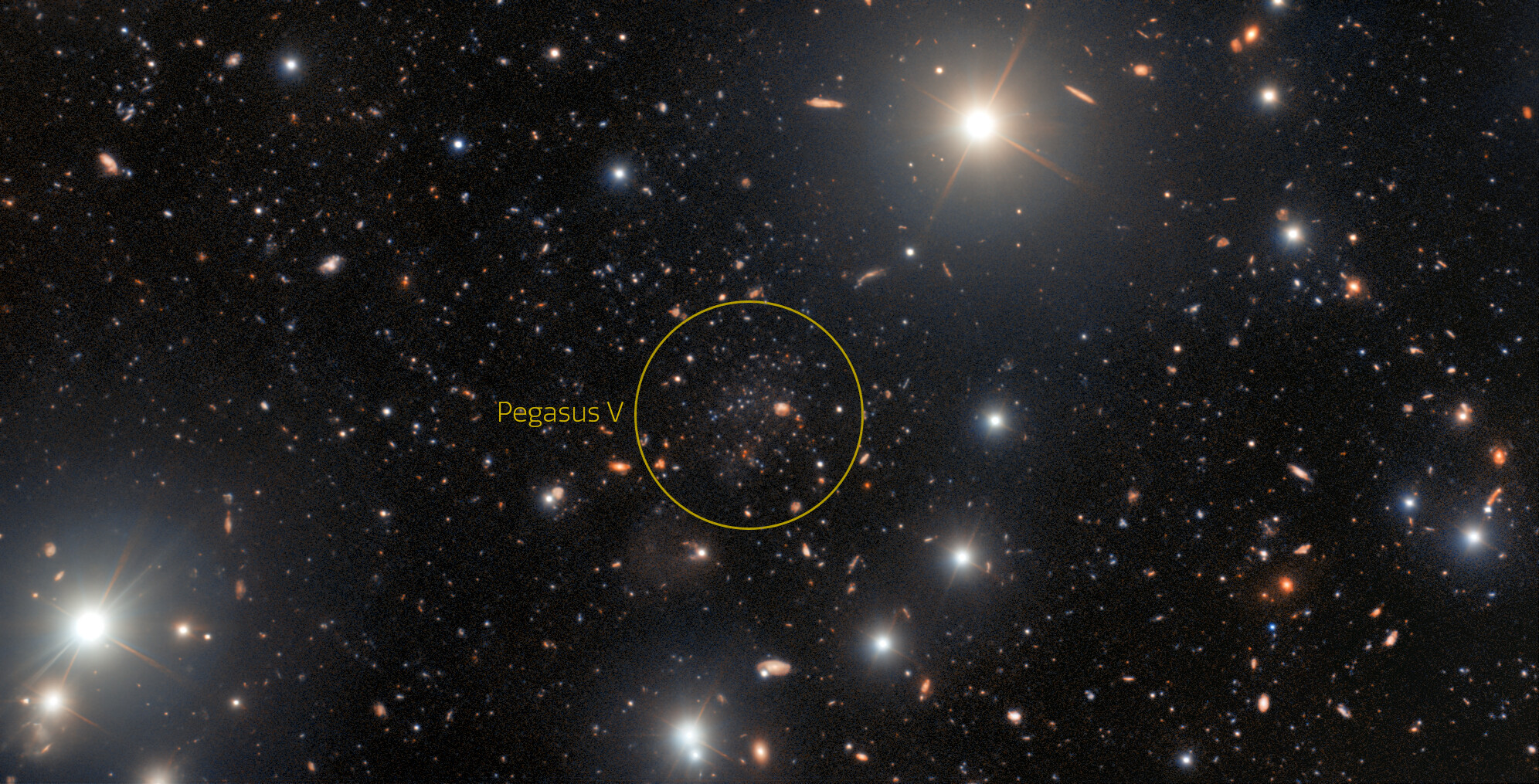
- Gemini Observatory photograph of Pegasus V/Andromeda XXXIV, circled in yellow.

Observation data
- Constellation: Pegasus
- Right ascension: 23^{h} 18^{m} 27.8^{s}
- Declination: +33° 21′ 32″
- Distance: 692 kpc (2.26 Mly)
- Apparent magnitude (V): 18.93 ± 0.43
- Absolute magnitude (V): -6.3 ± 0.2
- Surface brightness: 2.8+0.6 −0.4×10^{4} L_{☉}

Characteristics
- Mass: 4.1+0.16 −0.11 M_{☉}
- Half-light radius (physical): 87+40 −54
- Half-light radius (apparent): 0.44+0.2 −0.1

Pegasus V (Peg V), or Andromeda XXXIV (And XXXIV), is an ultra-faint dwarf galaxy and a minor satellite of the Andromeda Galaxy, located in the constellation Pegasus. Discovered by amateur astronomer Giuseppe Donatiello in 2022, it is one of the faintest objects in the Local Group.

== Discovery ==
Pegasus V was first identified by the Italian amateur astronomer Giuseppe Donatiello in 2022 as an unresolved over density of stars in the Andromeda constellation whilst he was analyzing the DESI Legacy Imaging Survey, conducted by the M4 Telescope; it was confirmed in April 2022 after further observations by the Gemini Observatory.

== Nomenclature ==
The galaxy's two names are derived from its location in the night sky, with Pegasus V referring to its location in the namesake constellation of Pegasus and Andromeda XXXIV its status as a satellite of the Andromeda Galaxy.

== Characteristics ==
Pegasus V is an ultra-faint dwarf galaxy, primarily composed of older metal-poor stars and very limited star formation, thus providing evidence that Pegasus V may be a remnant of an older, fossil group galaxies. Furthermore, its very small structure is consistent with open globular clusters within Andromeda's galactic halo; as a result, some astronomers have proposed it to be an open cluster rather than a dwarf galaxy.

Pegasus V orbits the Andromeda galaxy's galactic halo very closely, and has a very high apparent magnitude relative to Andromeda's other satellite galaxies.

== See also ==
- Messier 32
- Messier 110
