= List of Andromeda's satellite galaxies =

Collections of galaxies around Messier 31

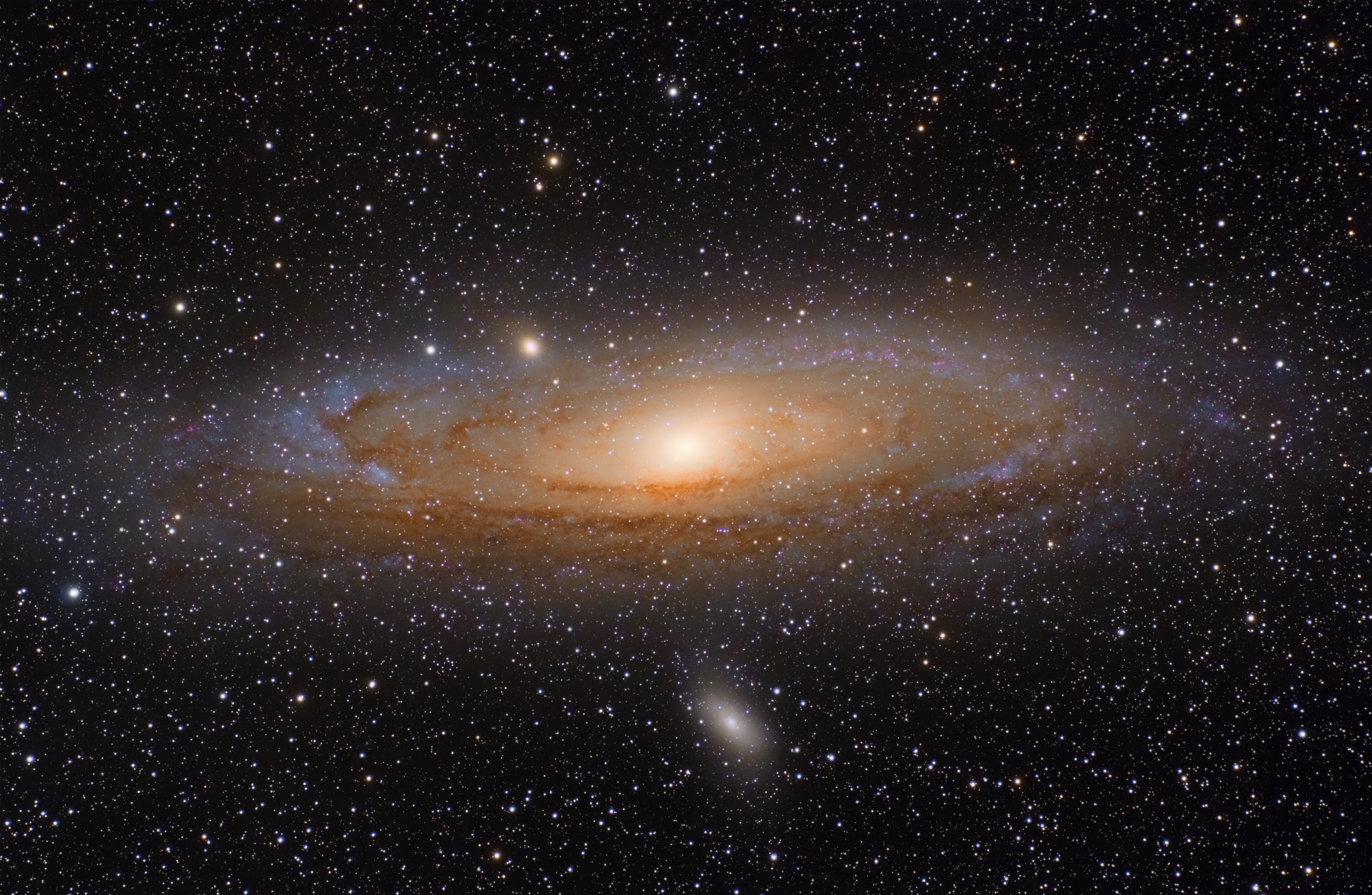
The Andromeda Galaxy with M110 at the bottom and M32 to the upper left of the core.

The Andromeda Galaxy (M31) has satellite galaxies just like the Milky Way. Orbiting M31 are at least 35 dwarf galaxies: the brightest and largest is M110, which can be seen with a basic telescope. The second-brightest and closest one to M31 is M32. The other galaxies are fainter, and were mostly discovered starting from the 1970s.

On January 11, 2006, it was announced that Andromeda Galaxy's faint companion galaxies lie on or close to a single plane running through the Andromeda Galaxy's center. This unexpected distribution is not obviously understood in the context of current models for galaxy formation. The plane of satellite galaxies points toward a nearby group of galaxies (M81 Group), possibly tracing the large-scale distribution of dark matter.

It is unknown whether the Triangulum Galaxy is a satellite of Andromeda.

== Table of known satellites ==
Andromeda Galaxy's satellites are listed here by discovery (orbital distance is not known). Andromeda IV is not included in the list, as it was discovered to be roughly 10 times further than Andromeda from the Milky Way in 2014, and therefore a completely unrelated galaxy.

Andromeda Galaxy's satellites
| Name | Type | Distance from Sun (million ly) | Right Ascension (Note: RA and DEC values marked in italics are rough estimates.) | Declination | Absolute Magnitude | Apparent magnitude | Mass-to-light ratio | 3D distance to M31 (kly) | Year discovered | Notes |
|---|---|---|---|---|---|---|---|---|---|---|
| M32 | dE2 | 2.48 | 00^{h} 42^{m} 41.877^{s} | +40° 51′ 54.71″ | | +8.1 | | | 1749 | |
| M110 | dE6 | 2.69 | 00^{h} 40^{m} 22.054^{s} | +41° 41′ 08.04″ | −16.5 | +8.5 | | | 1773 | |
| NGC 185 | dE5 | 2.01 | 00^{h} 38^{m} 57.523^{s} | +48° 20′ 14.86″ | | +10.1 | | | 1787 | |
| NGC 147 | dE5 | 2.2 | 00^{h} 33^{m} 12.131^{s} | +48° 30′ 32.82″ | | +10.5 | | | 1829 | |
| Andromeda I | dSph | 2.43 | 00^{h} 45^{m} 39.264^{s} | +38° 02′ 35.17″ | −11.8 | +13.6 | 31 ± 6 | | 1970 | |
| Andromeda II (Note: Martin et al. (2009) gave aliases to several satellite galaxies of the Andromeda Galaxy that are located in Pisces. However, the name Pisces II was later used for a different galaxy that is a satellite of the Milky Way, so it is not used here.) | dSph | 2.13 | 01^{h} 16^{m} 28.136^{s} | +33° 25′ 50.36″ | −12.6 | +13.5 | 13 ± 3 | | 1970 | |
| Andromeda III | dSph | 2.44 | 00^{h} 35^{m} 31.777^{s} | +36° 30′ 04.19″ | −10.2 | +15.0 | 19 ± 12 | | 1970 | |
| Andromeda V | dSph | 2.52 | 01^{h} 10^{m} 16.952^{s} | +47° 37′ 40.12″ | −9.6 | +15.9 | 78 ± 50 | | 1998 | |
| Pegasus Dwarf Spheroidal (Andromeda VI) | dSph | 2.55 | 23^{h} 51^{m} 46.516^{s} | +24° 34′ 55.69″ | −11.5 | +14.2 | 12 ± 5 | | 1998 | |
| Cassiopeia Dwarf (Andromeda VII) | dSph | 2.49 | 23^{h} 26^{m} 33.321^{s} | +50° 40′ 49.98″ | −13.3 | +12.9 | 7.1 ± 2.8 | | 1998 | |
| Andromeda VIII | dSph | 2.7 | 00^{h} 42^{m} 06^{s} | +40° 37′ 00″ | | +9.1 | | | 2003 | Tidally disrupting; identification unclear |
| Andromeda IX | dSph | 2.5 | 00^{h} 52^{m} 52.493^{s} | +43° 11′ 55.66″ | −8.3 | +16.2 | | 127.2 | 2004 | |
| Andromeda X | dSph | 2.9 | 01^{h} 06^{m} 34.740^{s} | +44° 48′ 23.31″ | −8.1 | +16.1 | 63 ± 40 | 332.7 | 2005 | |
| Andromeda XI | dSph | | 00^{h} 46^{m} 20^{s} | +33° 48′ 05″ | −7.3 | | | | 2006 | |
| Andromeda XII | dSph | | 00^{h} 47^{m} 27^{s} | +33° 22′ 29″ | −6.4 | | | | 2006 | |
| Andromeda XIII (Pisces III) | dSph | | 00^{h} 51^{m} 49.555^{s} | +33° 00′ 31.40″ | −6.9 | | | | 2006 | |
| Andromeda XIV (Pisces IV) | dSph | | 00^{h} 41^{m} 35.219^{s} | +29° 41′ 45.87″ | −8.3 | | 102 ± 71 | | 2007 | |
| Andromeda XV | dSph | | 01^{h} 14^{m} 18.7^{s} | +38° 07′ 02.9″ | −9.4 | | | | 2007 | |
| Andromeda XVI (Pisces V) | dSph | 2.143 | 00^{h} 59^{m} 29.843^{s} | +32° 22′ 27.96″ | −9.2 | | | 580.6 | 2007 | |
| Andromeda XVII | dSph | | 00^{h} 37^{m} 07^{s} | +44° 19′ 20″ | −8.5 | | | 313.1 | 2008 | |
| Andromeda XVIII | dSph/Sm | | 00^{h} 02^{m} 15.184^{s} | +45° 05′ 19.78″ | | | | 515.3 | 2008 | |
| Andromeda XIX | dSph | | 00^{h} 19^{m} 32.1^{s} | +35° 02′ 37.1″ | −9.3 | | | | 2008 | |
| Andromeda XX | dSph | | 00^{h} 07^{m} 30.530^{s} | +35° 07′ 45.94″ | −6.3 | | | 512.1 | 2008 | |
| Andromeda XXI | dSph | | 23^{h} 54^{m} 47.7^{s} | +42° 28′ 15″ | −9.9 | | | 472.9 | 2009 | |
| Andromeda XXII | dSph | | 00^{h} 27^{m} 40^{s} | +28° 05′ 25″ | −7.0 | | | 910 | 2009 | |
| Andromeda XXIII | dIrr | | 01^{h} 29^{m} 21.944^{s} | +38° 43′ 05.97″ | | | | 427.3 | 2011 | |
| Andromeda XXIV | | | 01^{h} 18^{m} 30^{s} | +46° 21′ 58″ | | | | 401.2 | 2011 | |
| Andromeda XXV | | | 00^{h} 30^{m} 08.9^{s} | +46° 51′ 07″ | | | | 319.6 | 2011 | |
| Andromeda XXVI | | | 00^{h} 23^{m} 45.6^{s} | +47° 54′ 58″ | | | | 489.2 | 2011 | |
| Andromeda XXVII | | | 00^{h} 37^{m} 27.1^{s} | +45° 23′ 13″ | | | | | 2011 | Tidally disrupted |
| Andromeda XXVIII | dSph | | 22^{h} 32^{m} 41.449^{s} | +31° 12′ 59.10″ | −8.8 | | | | 2011 | |
| Andromeda XXIX | dIrr | | 23^{h} 58^{m} 55.440^{s} | +30° 45′ 22.09″ | | | | 636 | 2011 | |
| Andromeda XXX (Cassiopeia II) | dSph? | | 00^{h} 36^{m} 34.9^{s} | +49° 38′ 48″ | | | | | | |
| Andromeda XXXI (Lacerta I) | dSph? | | 22^{h} 58^{m} 16.3^{s} | +41° 17′ 28″ | | | | | 2013 | |
| Andromeda XXXII (Cassiopeia III) | dSph? | 2.74 | 00^{h} 35^{m} 59.4^{s} | +51° 33′ 35″ | | | | 508 | 2013 | |
| Andromeda XXXIII (Perseus I) | dSph? | 2.41 | 03^{h} 01^{m} 23.6^{s} | +40° 59′ 18″ | | | | 1,140 | 2013 | |
| Andromeda XXXVI | dSph | | 01 16 39.91 | +47 39 13.3 | | | 64 ±30 | 388 | 2026 | A ultra-faint galaxy. Possibly the second most compact satellite of Andromeda. |
| Tidal Stream Northwest (Tidal Stream E and F) | | | 00^{h} 20^{m} 00^{s} | +46° 00′ 00″ | | | | | 2009 | |
| Tidal Stream Southwest | | | 00^{h} 30^{m} 00^{s} | +37° 30′ 00″ | | | | | 2009 | |
| Pegasus V galaxy (Peg V, Andromeda XXXIV) | d | 682 kpc (2.22 Mly) | 23^{h} 18^{m} 27.8^{s}±0.1 | +33° 21′ 32″±3 | −6.3 | | | 800 | 2022 | |
| Andromeda XXXV | | 3.02 | 00^{h} 26^{m} 38.6^{s} | +40° 06′ 29.3″ | -5.2 | | | 520 | 2025 | |
| Triangulum Galaxy (M33) (Note: It is uncertain whether it is a companion galaxy of the Andromeda Galaxy.) | SA(s)cd | 2.59 | 01^{h} 33^{m} 50.883^{s} | +30° 39′ 36.54″ | | +6.27 | | 750 | 1654? | Its relation to Andromeda is uncertain. |

== See also ==
- Satellite galaxies of the Milky Way
- List of nearest galaxies
- Local Group
