= Clear Sky Chart =

Weather forecast service for astronomers

Clear Sky Charts (called clocks until February 29, 2008) are web graphics which deliver weather forecasts designed specifically for astronomers. They forecast the cloud cover, transparency and astronomical seeing, parameters which are not forecast by civil or aviation forecasts. They forecast hourly data, but are limited to forecasting at most 48 hours into the future. Each individual chart provides data for only a 9 mile radius, and so are essentially point forecasts. There are clear sky chart forecasts for over 6100 locations, though the coverage area is limited to Canada, the USA and parts of Mexico and the Caribbean. Locations are typically cities, professional and public observatories, colleges and science centers. However there are also clear sky charts for star parties and backyard observatories.

Sample image of a clear sky clock for one particular observatory.

== History ==
In 2000, Allan Rahill, a meteorologist at the Canadian Meteorological Centre (CMC) and amateur astronomer, created a forecast processing step that took data from CMC's Global Element Multi-scale (GEM) forecast model and created a new forecast of cloud cover. Rahill specially designed his cloud forecast to consider the formation of cirrus clouds. The cirrus cloud modeling distinguishes Rahill's model from other cloud forecast models, as sufficient cirrus clouds to make a night unusable for astronomers are still called "clear" by civil weather forecasts.

In later years, Rahill added a forecast of astronomical transparency, which is a measure of how much starlight traverses the Earth's atmosphere when otherwise free of clouds. Rahill also added a forecast of astronomical seeing which uses forecast data of turbulence and temperature gradients in the atmosphere to forecast its optical steadiness.

In 2001, Attilla Danko, computer programmer and amateur astronomer, began to summarize Rahill's hundreds of forecast maps by displaying only one pixel, from each map, laid out in rows. The resulting meteogram, called a clear sky chart, showed all of Rahill's forecast data, but for only one location. Danko writes "It shows at a glance when, in the next 48 hours, we might expect clear and dark skies for one specific observing site". Danko accepts requests from observatories and private individuals to create new CSCs for locations not currently covered. However, since CMC's GEM model only covers North America, CSCs are limited to North America. In 2020, Danko added Norwegian/European forecast (ECMWF) information to some charts. Research continues as to which forecast is more reliable.

=== Name change ===
On February 29, 2008 Danko changed the name of the CSCs to "clear sky charts" to avoid any possibility of legal action on the part of Skyclock company of Michigan who owns a USA registered trademark on the name "SKYCLOCK". Danko's attorney opined that he was not infringing Skyclock Company's trademark, but also advised that changing the name was the "least painful" and least "expensive" solution. However, there continue to be references to the old name on web sites not controlled by the domain cleardarksky.com.

=== Alternative Services ===
Alternative services include 7timer (based on NOAA data) and Astrospheric (based on CMC data).

== Recognition ==
Rahill and Danko have received awards from meteorological and astronomical organizations:

- In 2010, the Astronomical Society of the Pacific awarded their Amateur Achievement Award to Allan Rahill on behalf of the Clear Sky Chart team composed of Allan Rahill and Attilla Danko.
- In 2009, Asteroid discoverer Andrew Lowe named asteroids 161693 Attilladanko (2006 HL46) and 171153 Allanrahill (2005 GL81) in recognition of Danko's and Rahill's forecasts.
- In 2004, the Canadian Meteorological and Oceanographic Society (CMOS) granted a citation to Rahill and Danko for a "vivid example of meteorology in support of astronomy".
- In 2005, the Royal Astronomical Society of Canada awarded Danko the Ken Chilton Prize in recognition of the "Clear Sky Clock".
- In 2003, the Astronomical League awarded Danko the Omega Centauri Award for making observing more efficient through the clear sky clock.

Since the clear sky charts terms of use permit non-commercial web sites to display clear sky chart images, they are most commonly recognized by private and club astronomy websites in North America.

Other Recognition:

- Asteroid Allanrahill
- Asteroid Attilladanko
