= List of Triangulum's suspected satellite galaxies =

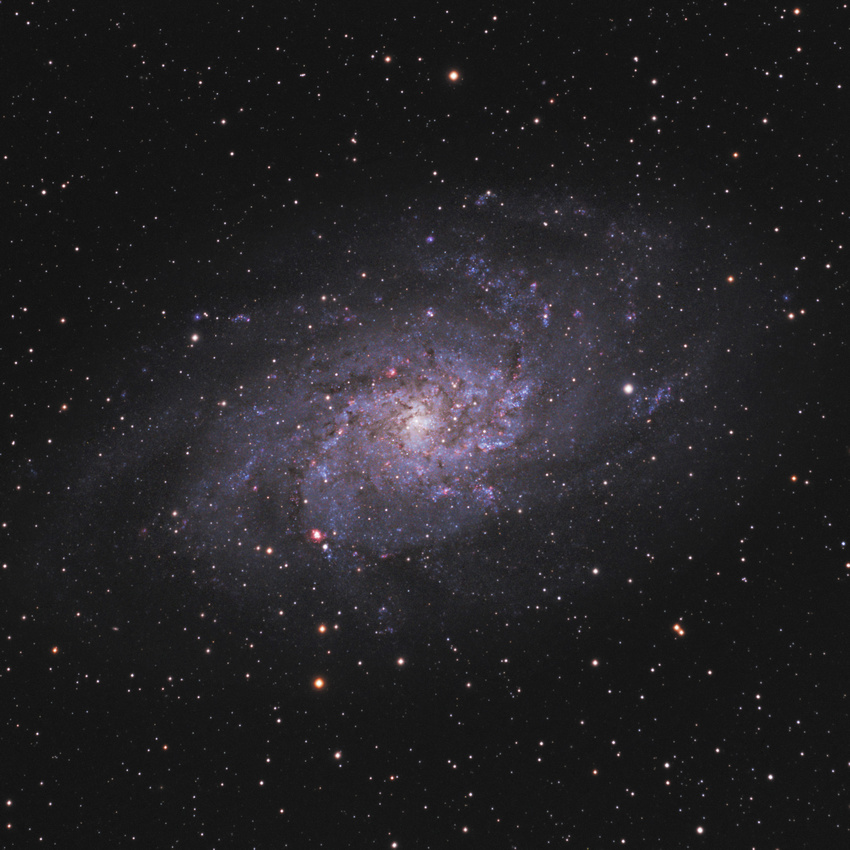
Triangulum Galaxy

The Triangulum subgroup is made up of the Triangulum Galaxy (M33) and its satellites. Although the Triangulum Galaxy does not have any proven satellite galaxies, a number of galaxies are suspected of being in the system.

== Andromeda XXII ==
Andromeda XXII is located much closer in projection to M33 than M31 (42 kiloparsecs (140 kly) vs. 224 kiloparsecs (730 kly)). This fact suggests that it might be the first Triangulum (M33) satellite ever discovered. However, it is currently catalogued as a satellite of Andromeda (M31).

== Pisces Dwarf ==
Pisces Dwarf is an irregular dwarf galaxy that is part of the Local Group. The galaxy is also suspected of being a satellite galaxy of the Triangulum Galaxy.

== Andromeda II ==
Andromeda II is a dwarf spheroidal galaxy about 2.22 Mly away in the constellation Andromeda. It is part of the Local group of galaxies and is a satellite galaxy of the Andromeda Galaxy (M31) but it is also situated closely to the Triangulum Galaxy (M33), it is not quite clear if it is a satellite of the one or the other galaxy.

== Pisces VII ==
Pisces VII, also known as Triangulum III, is an ultra-faint dwarf galaxy in the constellation of Pisces. Its distance has been found to be 2.99 Mly, meaning it is likely associated with the Triangulum Galaxy.

== Data ==
Name	Type	Distance from Sun (million ly)	Magnitude	Year discovered
Triangulum Galaxy	Spiral Sc	2.88	+6.27	1654?
Triangulum I (Andromeda XXII)				2009
Pisces Dwarf	Elliptical E3	2.51		1976
Andromeda II	Elliptical E3	2.13	+13	1970
Pisces VII (Triangulum III)	Dwarf UFD	2.99		2021
