= Meteorograph =

Meteorograph may refer to:

- Meteogram, a graphical presentation of weather variables with respect to time
- Barograph, a pressure recording device
- Thermo-hygrograph, a pressure and temperature recording device
