= XAND =

XAND or variant, may refer to:

- X And - X Andromedae, the variable star
- χ And - Chi Andromedae, the G8III star
- an alternative name for XNOR, a logic gate
- Xand van Tulleken, known as Dr Xand

== See also ==
- And X (Andromeda X), galaxy
- 10 And (10 Andromedae), star
