= Pisces VII (dwarf galaxy) =

Suspected satellite galaxy of Triangulum

Pisces VII/Triangulum III
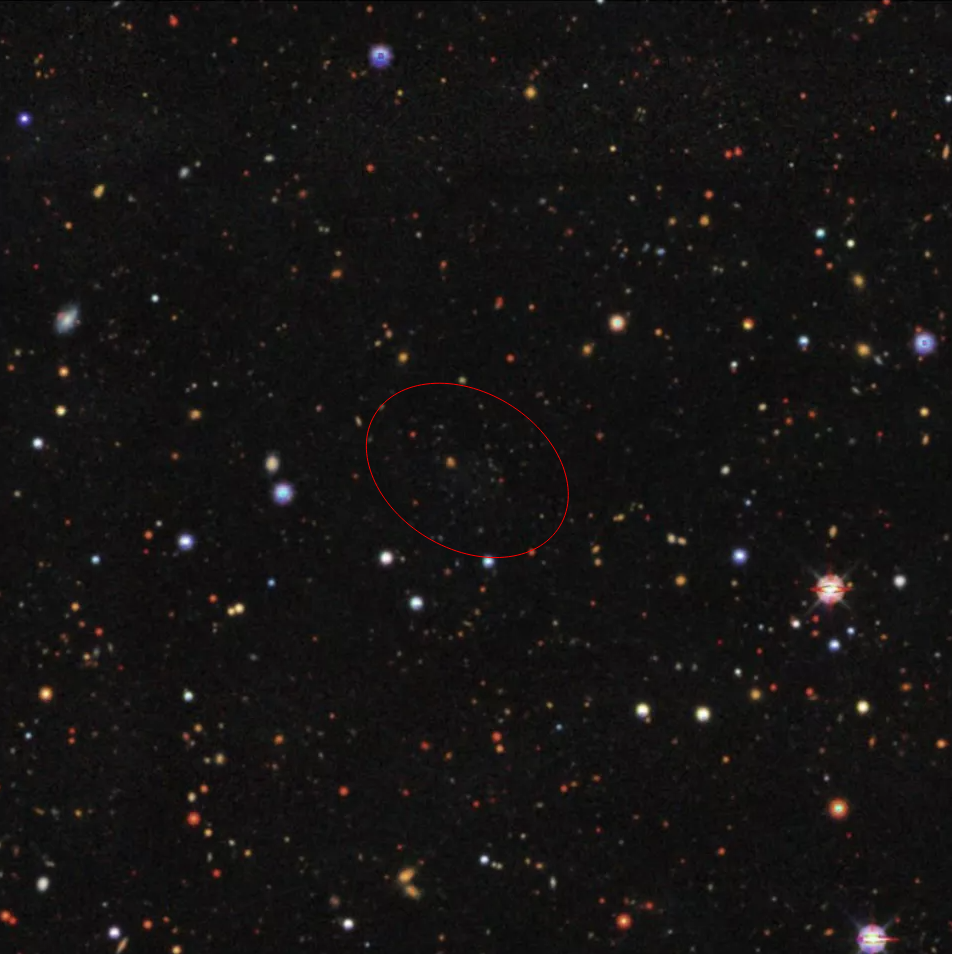
- Pisces VII/Triangulum III (circled in red), taken by the Dark Energy Spectroscopic Instrument (DESI) Legacy Imaging Survey (LSI)

Observation data (J2000 epoch)
- Constellation: Pisces
- Right ascension: 01^{h} 21^{m} 40.5^{s}
- Declination: +26° 23′ 24″
- Distance: 1,050 kpc (3.4 Mly)
- Apparent magnitude (V): 13.6 ± 2
- Absolute magnitude (V): -6.1 ± 2
- Surface brightness: 2.2+0.5 −0.7×10^{4} L_{☉}

Characteristics
- Mass: (2.0±0.1)×10^{4} M_{☉}
- Half-light radius (physical): 119 ± 48 parsecs

Pisces VII (Psc VII), or Triangulum III (Tri III), is an ultra-faint dwarf galaxy and a possible satellite of the Triangulum Galaxy (Messier 33 or NGC 598). It is likely a small elliptical or irregular galaxy, and is one of the faintest objects within the Local Group, with an apparent magnitude of only 13.6. It was first reported in 2020 by amateur astronomer Giuseppe Donatiello during a review of an astronomical survey, and was later confirmed by the Italian Galileo National Telescope, therefore making it first galaxy within the Local Group to have been discovered by an amateur astronomer.

== Discovery ==
Giuseppe Donatiello discovered Pisces VII in 2020 while analyzing the Dark Energy Camera Legacy Survey (DECaLS), a public astronomy survey conducted by the Cerro Tololo Inter-American Observatory using the Blanco 4m telescope. He reported it after identifying an unresolved over-density of stellar mass within the Pisces constellation; it was later confirmed by the Galileo National Telescope, making it the first Local Group object to have been discovered by an amateur astronomer.

== Nomenclature ==
Pisces VII or Triangulum III received both names from its location in the night sky; Pisces VII is derived from the galaxy's namesake constellation, Pisces, and is abbreviated as "Psc VII"; and Triangulum III, from its status as a suspected, unconfirmed satellite galaxy of Triangulum.

== Characteristics ==
Pisces VII is a small elliptical or irregular galaxy which is primarily composed of smaller, old red-dwarf stars, with a small population of younger blue giants; this has contributed to Pisces VII's unusually high apparent magnitude of 13.6±2, in spite of its relatively close proximity to Earth, and makes it one of the faintest objects within the Local Group at a solar luminosity of only 2.2×10^{4} L_{☉}, and an absolute magnitude of −6.1±2. It orbits 97 ± 6 kiloparsecs (316,372 ± 341.56 light years) away from Triangulum's galactic center, lying primarily within the galaxy's dark-matter halo.

Due to the slightly warped structure of Triangulum, it is theorized that it made a close flyby with the Andromeda Galaxy within the past few billion years, and thus it is likely that much of the matter of Pisces VII was tidally stripped and pulled into Andromeda, leaving a much dimmer, fainter structure.

== Observation ==
Location of Pisces VII/Triangulum III in the constellation Pisces (circled)

Pisces VII is visible in the namesake constellation of Pisces at a right ascension of 20^{h} 25^{m} 8.4^{s} and a declination of 26° 23′ 27.6″, in the J2000 epoch. Due to its high magnitude, it cannot be seen with the naked human eye, and is extremely difficult to resolve and observe with amateur telescopes.

== See also ==
- Giuseppe Donatiello
- List of Triangulum's suspected satellite galaxies
- Magellanic Clouds, dwarf satellite galaxies of the Milky Way
- Pisces II, dwarf satellite galaxy of the Milky Way
