= 4230 van den Bergh =

Hildian asteroid

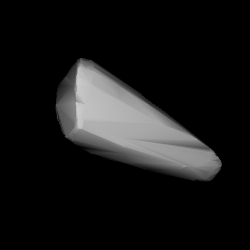
- van den Bergh modeled from its lightcurve

Discovery
- Discovered by: C. J. van Houten; I. van Houten-G. T. Gehrels (Palomar–Leiden survey)
- Discovery site: Palomar Obs.
- Discovery date: 19 September 1973

Designations
- Named after: Sidney Van den Bergh (Dutch–Canadian astronomer)
- Alternative designations: 1973 ST_{1} · 1978 JB_{2} 1979 OD
- Minor planet category: main-belt · (outer); Hilda · Schubart

Orbital characteristics
- Epoch 23 March 2018 (JD 2458200.5)
- Uncertainty parameter 0
- Observation arc: 65.60 yr (23,961 d)
- Aphelion: 4.4786 AU
- Perihelion: 3.4219 AU
- Semi-major axis: 3.9502 AU
- Eccentricity: 0.1338
- Orbital period (sidereal): 7.85 yr (2,868 d)
- Mean anomaly: 65.499°
- Mean motion: 0° 7^{m} 31.8^{s} / day
- Inclination: 3.0995°
- Longitude of ascending node: 160.47°
- Argument of perihelion: 20.889°

Physical characteristics
- Mean diameter: 28.461±0.777 km 37.75±2.9 km 42.63±2.24 km
- Synodic rotation period: 87.918±0.4071 h
- Geometric albedo: 0.021±0.002; 0.0259±0.005; 0.050±0.002
- Spectral type: C (assumed)
- Absolute magnitude (H): 11.70; 11.807±0.007 (R); 11.81±0.10

4230 van den Bergh (prov. designation: 1973 ST_{1}) is a highly elongated Hildian asteroid and member of the Schubart family from the outer regions of the asteroid belt. It was discovered on 19 September 1973, by Dutch astronomer couple Ingrid and Cornelis van Houten at Leiden Observatory, on photographic plates taken by Dutch–American astronomer Tom Gehrels at the Palomar Observatory, California. The assumed carbonaceous C-type asteroid has a very long rotation period of 88 hours and measures approximately 37 kilometers (23 miles) in diameter. It was named for Dutch–Canadian astronomer Sidney Van den Bergh.

== Orbit and classification ==
van den Bergh is a member of the Schubart family (002), a small family of a few hundred carbonaceous asteroids located in the dynamical region of the Hilda group. It orbits the Sun in the outer main-belt at a distance of 3.4–4.5 AU once every 7 years and 10 months (2,868 days; semi-major axis of 3.95 AU). Its orbit has an eccentricity of 0.13 and an inclination of 3° with respect to the ecliptic. The body's observation arc begins with a precovery taken at Palomar Observatory in November 1951, nearly 22 years prior to its official discovery observation. While the asteroid was discovered during the second Palomar–Leiden Trojan survey, it did not receive a "T"-prefixed survey designation.

== Naming ==
This minor planet was named after Sidney Van den Bergh (born 1929), Dutch-born Canadian astronomer and former director of the Dominion Astrophysical Observatory. Van den Bergh was the vice president of the International Astronomical Union from 1976 to 1982. The official naming citation was published by the Minor Planet Center on 28 May 1991 (M.P.C. 18307).

== Physical characteristics ==
van den Bergh is an assumed, carbonaceous C-type asteroid, while its very low albedo (see below) is indicative for D- and P-types.

=== Rotation period ===
In August 2012, a rotational lightcurve of van den Bergh was obtained from photometric observations in the R-band by astronomers at the Palomar Transient Factory in California. Lightcurve analysis gave a long rotation period of 87.918 hours with a brightness amplitude of 1.09 magnitude, indicative of an elongated, non-spherical shape (U=2). A similarly strong brightness variation of 1.15 magnitude was measured in 2015. While not being a slow rotator, the asteroid's period is significantly longer than that measured for most asteroids.

=== Diameter and albedo ===
According to the surveys carried out by the Infrared Astronomical Satellite IRAS, the Japanese Akari satellite and the NEOWISE mission of NASA's Wide-field Infrared Survey Explorer, van den Bergh measures between 28.461 and 42.63 kilometers in diameter and its surface has an albedo between 0.021 and 0.050.

The Collaborative Asteroid Lightcurve Link adopts the results obtained by IRAS, that is, an albedo of 0.0259 and a diameter of 37.75 kilometers based on an absolute magnitude of 11.7.
