= Andromeda XXXVI =

Dwarf galaxy in constellation Andromeda

- Image of Andromeda XXXVI from Giuseppe Donatiello

Observation data (J2000 epoch)
- Constellation: Andromeda
- Right ascension: 01^{h} 16^{m} 40.3^{s}
- Declination: +47° 39′ 22″
- Distance: 776 kpc (2.53 Mly)
- Absolute magnitude (V): −5.9±0.1

Characteristics
- Type: dSph
- Half-light radius (physical): 208+98 −62 ly (64+30 −19 pc)
- Half-light radius (apparent): 0.284+0.132 −0.084
- Notable features: satellite galaxy of Andromeda Galaxy, one of the faintest discovered to date

Other designations
- And XXXVI, A36

Andromeda XXXVI (And XXXVI) is an ultra-faint dwarf spheroidal galaxy located at a distance of 776 kiloparsecs, or 2.53 million light-years, from the Sun in the constellation of Andromeda, within the Local Group. It is one of the faintest ultra-faint dwarf galaxies of M31 discovered to date.

== Discovery ==
Andromeda XXXVI was first identified by astrophotographer and amateur astronomer Giuseppe Donatiello during a visual inspection of archival public data from the Pan-Andromeda Archaeological Survey (PAndAS), conducted with the Canada-France-Hawaii Telescope, and subsequently confirmed through observations using the Gran Telescopio Canarias. The results were published in the scientific journal Astronomy & Astrophysics on June 25, 2026.

== Physical characteristics ==
Andromeda XXXVI is classified as an ultra-faint dwarf spheroidal galaxy with an effective half-light radius of 208+98
−62 light-years (64+30
−19 parsecs). The galaxy’s ellipticity is extremely low, approximately 0.015+0.032
−0.012, which gives its projection on the sky a nearly perfect spherical shape. The position angle of the major axis is θ = 78.6+29.7
−28.5. The absolute magnitude of the galaxy in the visible range is estimated at M_{V} = −5.9±0.1.

Its projected distance from the center of the Andromeda Galaxy is about 388,000 light-years. Given that the virial radius of M31’s gravitational influence is estimated at 850,000 light-years, Andromeda XXXVI lies deep within its halo and is a gravitationally bound satellite.

Color-magnitude diagram modeling indicates that the system's stellar population is approximately 12.5 billion years old, with a metallicity [Fe/H] = −2.5. Such a low abundance of elements heavier than helium suggests that the galaxy formed in the early Universe, underwent only a brief initial burst of star formation, and is completely devoid of the modern interstellar gas required to trigger the formation of new stars.

== See also ==
- List of Andromeda's satellite galaxies
- Dwarf spheroidal galaxy (dSph)
- Andromeda Galaxy
