= Andromeda IV =

Isolated irregular dwarf galaxy in the constellation of Andromeda

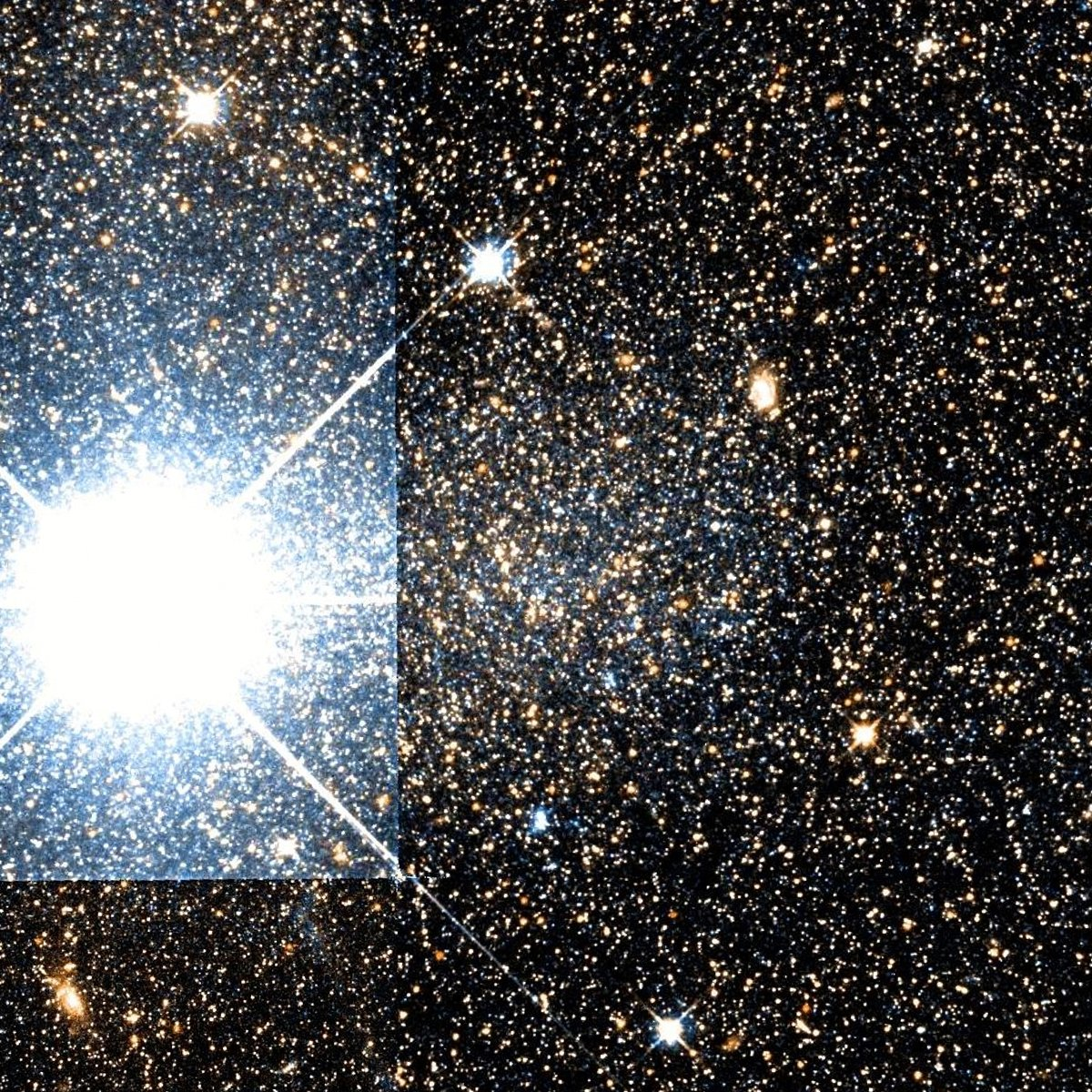
- Andromeda IV just about 30″ to the right from TYC 2801-551-1 star (mag: 10.3); HST

Observation data (J2000 epoch)
- Constellation: Andromeda
- Right ascension: 00^{h} 42^{m} 32.3^{s}
- Declination: +40° 34′ 19″
- Redshift: 256 ± 9 km/s
- Apparent magnitude (V): 16.6B

Characteristics
- Type: Dwarf irregular
- Apparent size (V): 1.3′ × 1.0′

Other designations
- And IV, PGC 2544

Andromeda IV (And IV) is an isolated irregular dwarf galaxy. The moderate surface brightness, a very blue color, low current star-formation rate and low metallicity are consistent with it being a small (background) dwarf irregular galaxy, perhaps similar to Local Group dwarfs such as IC 1613 and Sextans A. Arguments based on the observed radial velocity and the tentative detection of the RGB tip suggest that it lies well outside the confines of the Local Group.

Further study using the Hubble Space Telescope has shown it to be a solitary irregular dwarf galaxy. The galaxy is between 22 and 24 million light-years from Earth, and so is not close to the Andromeda Galaxy at all. The galaxy is severely isolated. The Holmberg diameter is 1,880 parsecs, but neutral atomic hydrogen gas extends more than eight times further out in a disk. The galaxy is very dark, and the baryonic mass to dark matter ratio is 0.11.

== History ==
It was discovered by Sidney van den Bergh in 1972.

== See also ==
- List of Andromeda's satellite galaxies
