= NGC 404 =

Galaxy in the constellation Andromeda

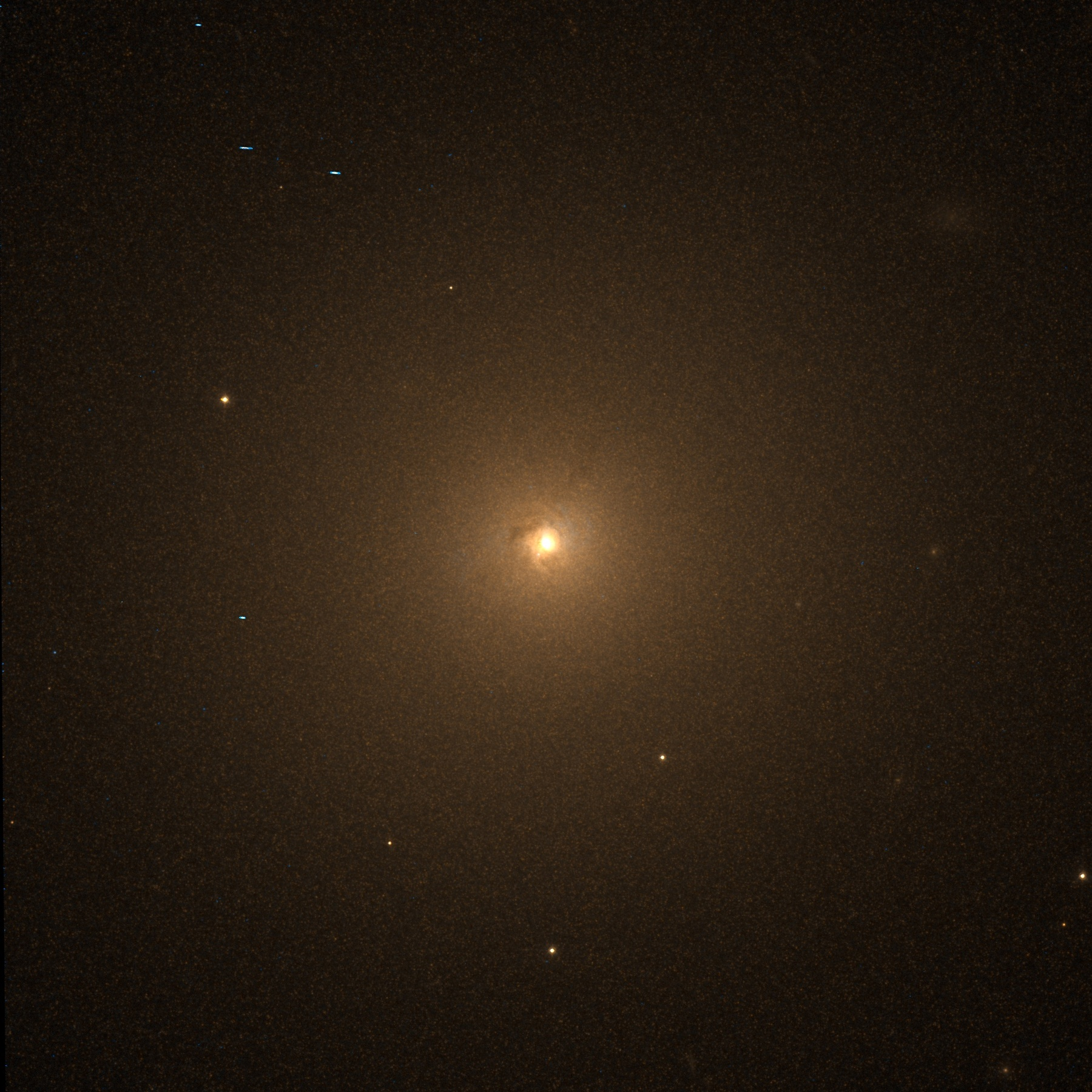
- NGC 404 by Hubble Space Telescope; 1.68′ view

Observation data (J2000 epoch)
- Constellation: Andromeda
- Right ascension: 01^{h} 09^{m} 27.0^{s}
- Declination: +35° 43′ 04″
- Redshift: −48 ± 9 km/s
- Distance: 10.0 ± 0.7 Mly (3.07 ± 0.21 Mpc)^{[a]}
- Apparent magnitude (V): 11.2

Characteristics
- Type: SA(s)0^{−}
- Apparent size (V): 3′.5 × 3′.5

Other designations
- UGC 718, PGC 4126

NGC 404, also known as the Lost Pearl Galaxy or Mirach's Ghost, is a field galaxy located about 10 million light years away in the constellation Andromeda. It was discovered by William Herschel in 1784, and is visible through small telescopes. NGC 404 lies just beyond the Local Group and does not appear gravitationally bound to it. It is located within 7 arc-minutes of second magnitude star Mirach, making it a difficult target to observe or photograph and granting it the nickname "Mirach's Ghost".

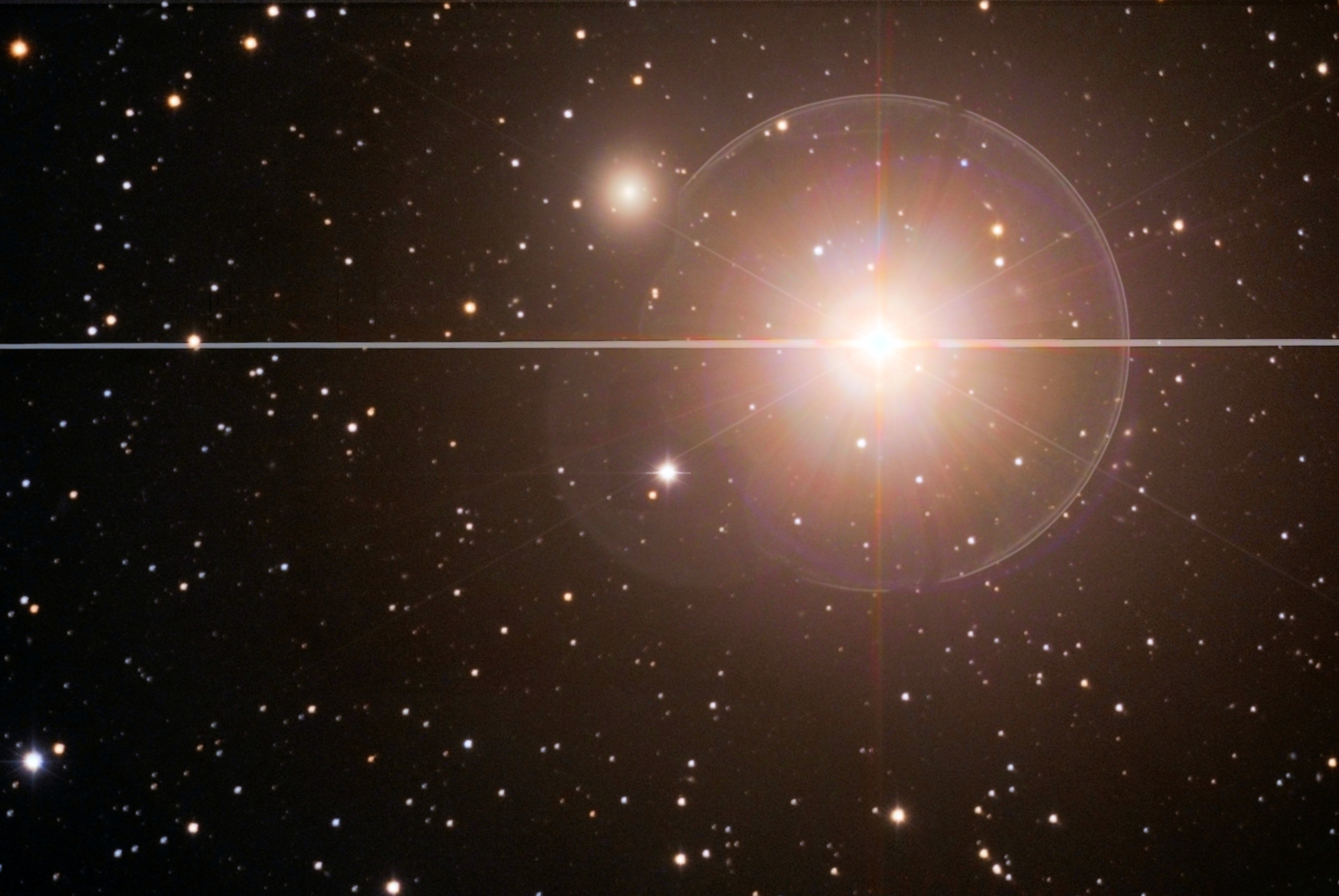
Mirach & NGC 404

== Physical characteristics ==
NGC 404 is a very isolated dwarf lenticular galaxy, a bit more luminous and smaller than the Small Magellanic Cloud. Unlike many other early-type galaxies, it is very rich in neutral hydrogen, most of it concentrated in a pair of large rings around it. It also has star formation both in its center and in its outermost regions, albeit at a low level.

Both the outer gas disk and its star formation are assumed to have been triggered by one or several mergers with smaller galaxies roughly 1 billion years ago and it has been proposed NGC 404 is a former spiral galaxy that was transformed into a lenticular one by that event.

== LINER emission ==
NGC 404 contains a low-ionization nuclear emission-line region (LINER), a type of region that is characterized by spectral line emission from weakly ionized atoms. A nuclear star cluster is also present as well as (likely) a supermassive black hole, with a mass of several tens of thousands solar masses.

== Distance measurements ==
At least two techniques have been used to measure distances to NGC 404. The infrared surface brightness fluctuations distance measurement technique estimates distances to spiral galaxies based on the graininess of the appearance of their bulges. The distance measured to NGC 404 using this technique in 2003 is 9.9 ± 0.5 Mly (3.03 ± 0.15 Mpc).

However, NGC 404 is close enough that red supergiants can be imaged as individual stars. The light from these stars and knowledge of how they should compare to nearby stars within the Milky Way galaxy allows for direct measurement of the distance to the galaxy. This method is referred to as the tip of the red giant branch (TRGB) method. The estimated distance to NGC 404 using this technique is 10.0 ± 1.2 Mly (3.1 ± 0.4 Mpc). Averaged together, these distance measurements give a distance estimate of 10.0 ± 0.7 Mly (3.07 ± 0.21 Mpc).^{[a]}

== Possible satellite ==
In 2018 a possible satellite designated Donatiello I was identified. Donatiello I is a dwarf spheroidal galaxy with little recent star formation. Difficulty in establishing the exact distance to the galaxy leaves its status as a satellite unconfirmed.

== Gallery ==
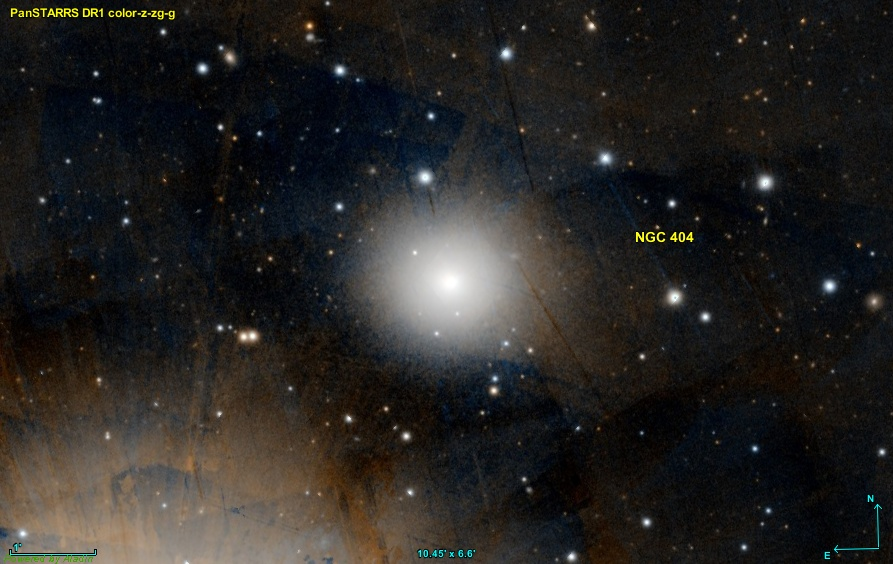
Pan-STARRS image of NGC 404

== Notes ==
1. average(3.03 ± 0.15, 3.1 ± 0.4) = ((3.03 + 3.1) / 2) ± ((0.15^{2} + 0.4^{2})^{0.5} / 2) = 3.07 ± 0.21
