= Andromeda I =

Dwarf galaxy in the constellation Andromeda

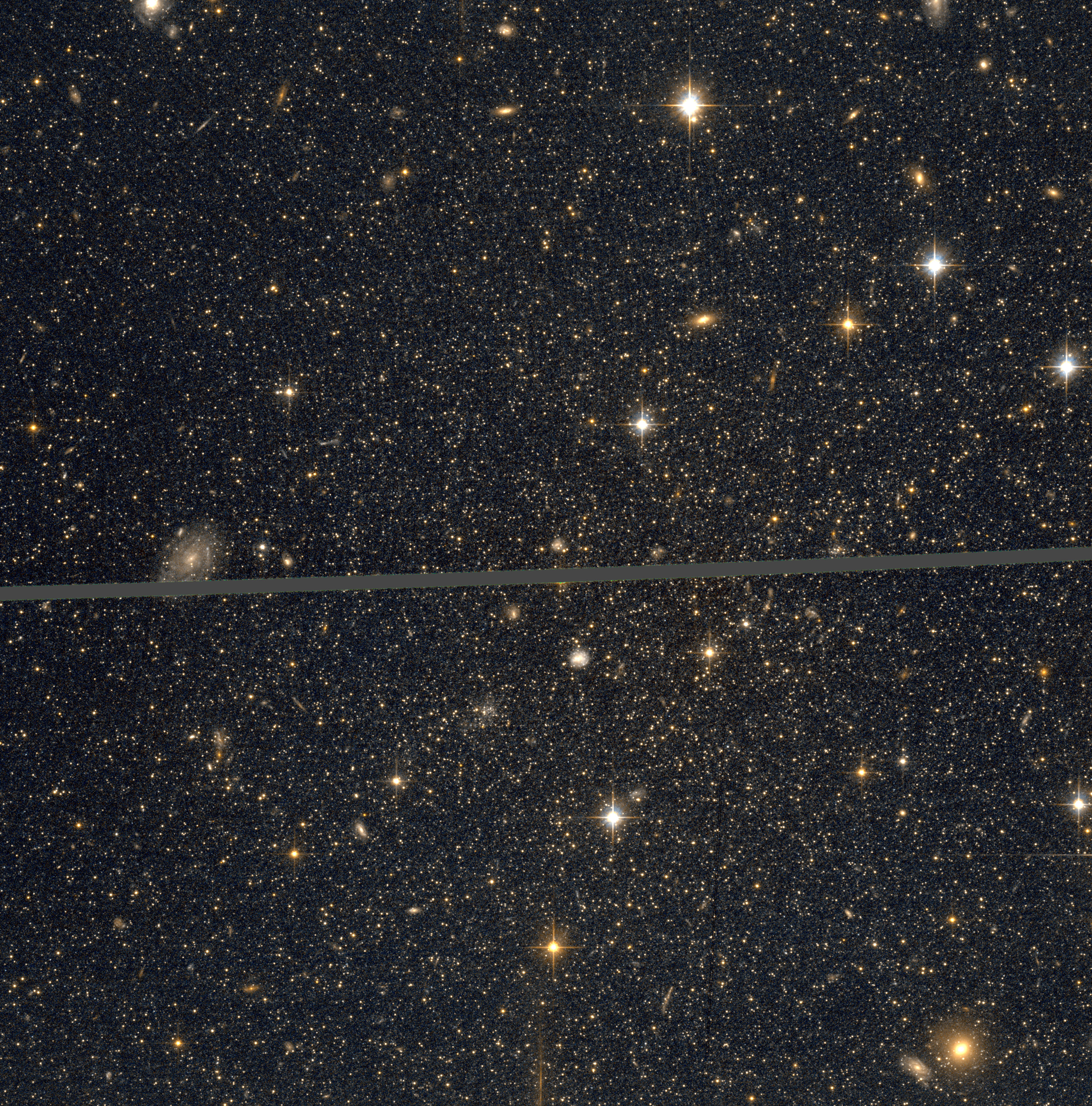
- Part of Andromeda I by the HST

Observation data (J2000 epoch)
- Constellation: Andromeda
- Right ascension: 00^{h} 45^{m} 39.8^{s}
- Declination: +38° 02′ 28″
- Redshift: -368 ± 11 km/s
- Distance: 2.40 ± 0.08 Mly (735 ± 23 kpc)
- Apparent magnitude (V): 13.6

Characteristics
- Type: dSph
- Apparent size (V): 2.5′ × 2.5′
- Notable features: satellite galaxy of M31

Other designations
- And I, Anon 0043+37, PGC 2666

Andromeda I is a dwarf spheroidal galaxy (dSph) about 2.40 million light-years away in the constellation Andromeda. Andromeda I is part of the local group of galaxies and a satellite galaxy of the Andromeda Galaxy (M31). It is roughly 3.5 degrees south and slightly east of M31. As of 2005, it is the closest known dSph companion to M31 at an estimated projected distance of ~40 kpc or ~150,000 light-years.

Andromeda I was discovered by Sidney van den Bergh in 1970 with the Mount Palomar Observatory 48-inch telescope. Further study of Andromeda I was done by the WFPC2 camera of the Hubble Space Telescope. This found that the horizontal branch stars, like other dwarf spheroidal galaxies were predominantly red. From this, and the abundance of blue horizontal branch stars, along with 99 RR Lyrae stars detected in 2005, lead to the conclusion there was an extended epoch of star formation. The estimated age is approximately 10 Gyr. The Hubble Space Telescope also found a globular cluster in Andromeda I, being the least luminous galaxy where such a cluster was found.

== See also ==
- Andromeda's satellite galaxies
