= Andromeda X =

Galaxy in constellation Andromeda

Observation data (J2000 epoch)
- Constellation: Andromeda
- Right ascension: 01^{h} 06^{m} 33.9^{s}
- Declination: +44° 48′ 16″
- Apparent magnitude (V): 16.1
- Absolute magnitude (V): -8.1

Characteristics
- Type: dSph
- Apparent size (V): 7 arcmin
- Notable features: satellite galaxy of the Andromeda Galaxy

Other designations
- And X, PGC 5056921

Andromeda X (And 10) is a dwarf spheroidal galaxy about 2.9 million light-years away from the Sun in the constellation Andromeda. Discovered in 2005 by Zucker et al., And X is a satellite galaxy of the Andromeda Galaxy (M31). Aided by the application of stellar photometry to data from the Sloan Digital Sky Survey similar to the Andromeda IX discovery, the new finding indicates that this type of extremely faint satellite might be common in the Local Group, potentially providing further support for hierarchical cold dark matter models.

== See also ==
- List of Andromeda's satellite galaxies
