= Andromeda III =

Dwarf spheroidal galaxy in the constellation Andromeda

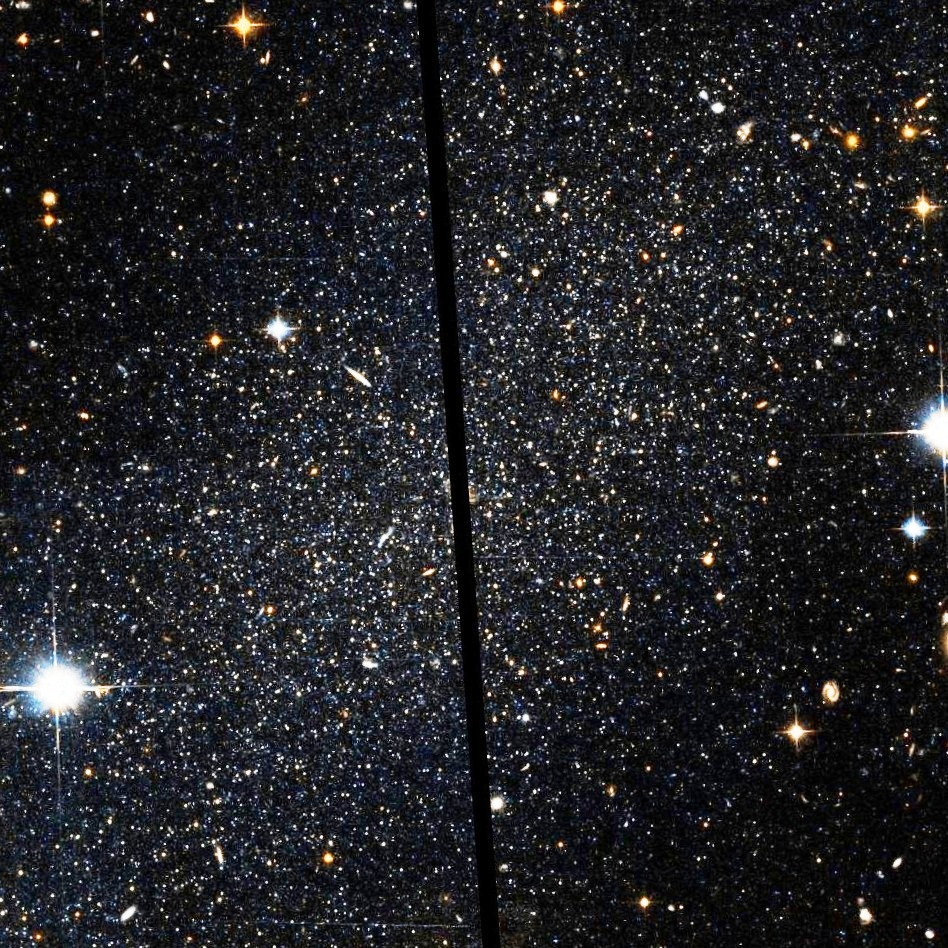

Observation data (J2000 epoch)
- Constellation: Andromeda
- Right ascension: 00^{h} 35^{m} 33.8^{s}
- Declination: +36° 29′ 52″
- Redshift: −351±9 km/s
- Distance: 2.44 ± 0.08 Mly (748 ± 25 kpc)
- Apparent magnitude (V): 15.0

Characteristics
- Type: dSph
- Size: 2.5 kly
- Apparent size (V): 4.5′ × 3.0′
- Notable features: satellite galaxy of M31

Other designations
- AndIII, RC2 Anon 0032+36, PGC 2121

Andromeda III is a dwarf spheroidal galaxy about 2.44 million light-years away in the constellation Andromeda. It is part of the Local Group and is a satellite galaxy of the Andromeda Galaxy (M31). The galaxy was discovered by Sidney van den Bergh on photographic plates taken in 1970 and 1971.

Observations of the dwarf galaxy using the WFPC2 in 2002 indicate that the bulk of the galaxy is around three billion years younger than the general population of globular clusters in our own galaxy. However, there are some older stars that are comparable in age to the Milky Way galactic clusters. There is no evidence for younger stars in this dwarf galaxy, suggesting no star formation is occurring. The dwarf galaxy is located at a distance of around 75 kpc from the center of M31. A total of 56 variable stars have been discovered in And III, including 51 RR Lyrae variables.

== See also ==
- List of Andromeda's satellite galaxies
