= Bareket Observatory =

Observatory in Modi'in-Maccabim-Re'ut, Israel

- Observatory code: B35
- Location: Modi'in-Maccabim-Re'ut, Israel
- Coordinates: 31.888189°N 35.031694°E
- Website: bareket-astro.com

Telescopes
- 15" f/2.8: 15" Astrograph reflector
- Newtonian 12" f/5.3: Planetary telescope, 12" prime focus reflector
- SCT 14" f/8.7: Remote controlled automated Internet robotic telescope

The Bareket Observatory (IAU code B35; 35.0317°N Parallax sinφ 0.84991 cosφ +0.52524) is an astronomical educational observatory owned and operated by the Bareket family. It is located east of the city of Maccabim, near Modiin, in central Israel.

== Equipment ==
The observatory developed the Israeli Internet Telescope, a robotic telescope system which enables students and teachers to have full control on its telescopic system, cooled CCD camera and CFW from their home or school, via the Internet. The Internet Telescope is offered free of charge to students and teachers in Israel as a part of the observatory's International Year of Astronomy 2009 activities, subject to usage regulations.

The observatory also has a 38 cm diameter astrograph telescope, which is a wide field reflector telescope mounted on a robotic computer-controlled equatorial mount. It is equipped with a cooled camera, a 10-position computerized filter wheel, photometric filters, and a spectrograph. The observatory's visitors use a variety of telescopes, including 8" and 11" Schmidt–Cassegrain telescopes (SCTs) and a special planetary 12" bino-reflector.

== Outreach and activities ==
The observatory offers open astronomy courses and classes.

As part of its mission to be an educational observatory (not one dedicated to research only), the organization provides astronomy instruction and public observation sessions, and also do so in remote areas for schools and individuals that don't have the ability of going to an observatory for physical or financial reasons. Once a year the observatory makes the Astronomical Olympics for schools, and developing tools for remote learning, such as:

- Remote controlled Mars rover diorama, as a part of the Planetary Society's Mars Station Project
- Remote controlled Internet telescope (The Israeli Internet telescope) which serves educators and students in several countries
- Live online astronomical webcasts
- A monthly Astronomical magazine, in the Hebrew language
- Open public observations, on special events, which usually attract hundreds of participants

== See also ==
- List of astronomical observatories
