= Meteogram =

Graphical presentation of weather variables

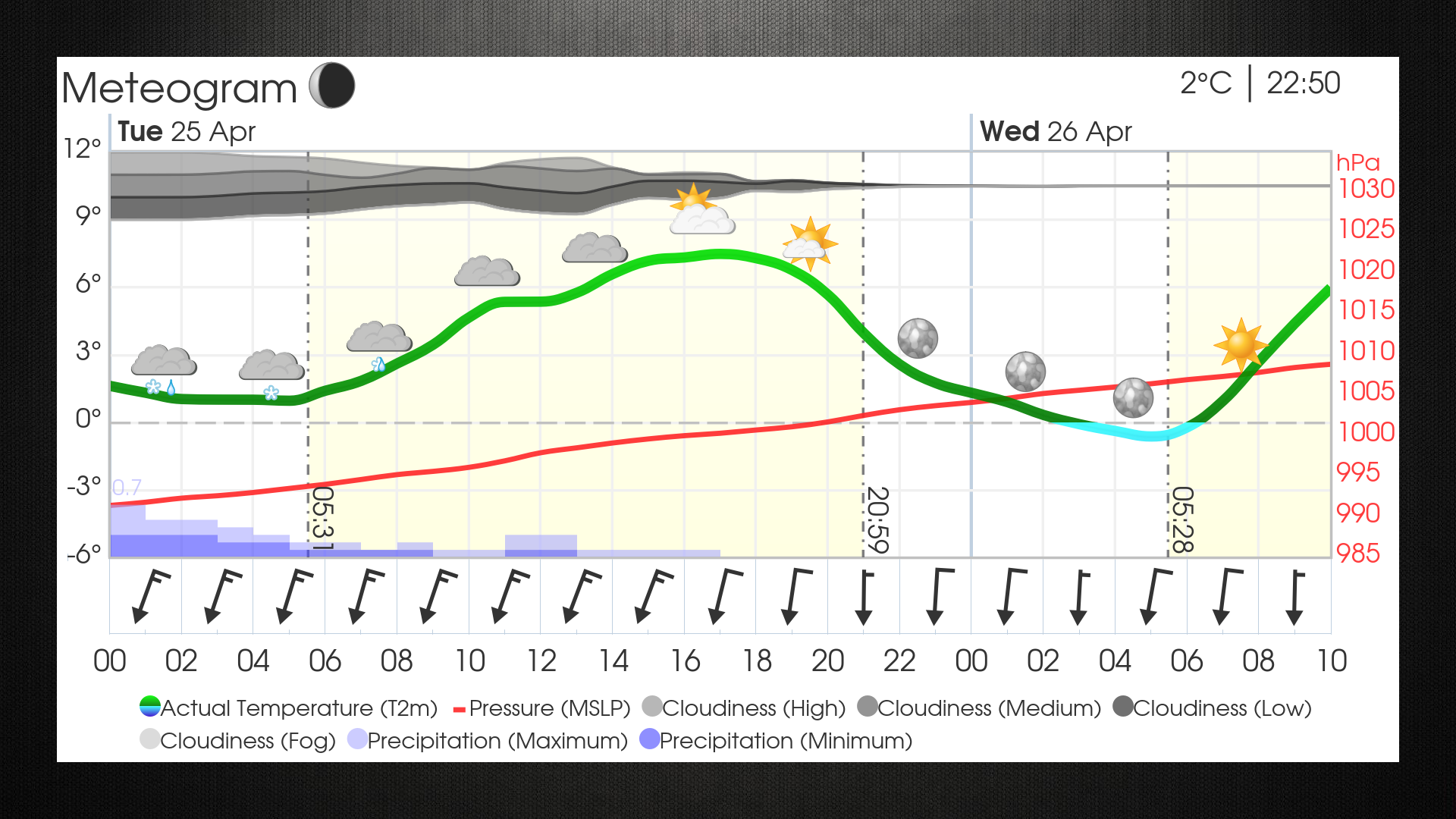
An example meteogram showing plots of temperature, pressure, precipitation, cloud cover, wind speed and wind direction

A meteogram, also known as a meteorogram, is a graphical presentation of one or more meteorological variables with respect to time, whether observed or forecast, for a particular location. Where forecast data is used, the meteogram will typically be generated directly from a weather forecasting model based on the longitude, latitude and elevation of the location, but it can also be corrected by a meteorologist. Where a meteogram is used to display historical weather observations, this will typically be for a specific weather station.

In the meteogram, time is plotted along the X axis, while the values of the different weather parameters are plotted along the Y axis. The most common weather parameters in a meteogram are precipitation, temperature, air pressure, cloud cover, wind speed and wind direction, such as in this example meteogram provided as part of a weather forecast by yr.no. In this example, wind speed and wind direction are conveniently presented in the form of wind barbs, precipitation is represented in column format, while temperature and air pressure are represented as lines. Cloud cover is represented in a layered format, providing an indication of the amount of cloud at different heights in the atmosphere. Meteograms can be static or interactive like for instance in this live meteogram for current location where user can zoom and scroll.

== History ==
J. H. Lambert (mathematician and scientist) and William Playfair (political economist), working in the late 1700s, used time-series plots in lieu of tables to describe data. This technique marked the revival of a graphic display after nearly 800 years from the first known time-series use. Over the two centuries since Lambert and Playfair, time-series graphs have been used frequently to show data, or data relationships, for a variety of variables.

The meteogram is one application of the time-series graph. Climate and weather are ideally suited for display using time-series techniques because of the way the variables change with time.

The meteorograph recording of weather variables "as they happen" is simply another application of time-series. Examples are the barograph, wind, or thermograph traces, and early upper air soundings. The mechanical meteorograph, which was used to take the first atmospheric soundings above the surface, traced the data in a series of lines similar to the seismograph, became known as a meteorogram of the sounding data.

Saucier described the use of meteorogram charts to analyze surface weather data with respect to time. It is a simple extension to project these variables into the future using data from the forecast models and produce the modern meteogram. So, meteograms have evolved to mean any group of meteorological variables graphed with respect to time, whether observed or forecast, usually confined to surface variables, though some include time-height charts. Meteogram use increased in the 1990s with the growth of computing power. Now meteograms are created from various models and made available to forecasters through the Internet. In addition, researchers and operational forecasters have the capability to make meteograms for their local use on their local computing systems.

The shorter spelling meteogram was apparently first used in the 1980s in the then-popular WXP (Weather Processor) computer program, by its primary developer, Dan Vietor.
