= Pan-Andromeda Archaeological Survey =

Astronomical survey

- Website: www.astrosci.ca/users/alan/PANDAS/Home.html

Pan-Andromeda Archaeological Survey (PAndAS) was a large-scale astronomical survey using the Canada-France-Hawaii Telescope. The survey captured data from over 400 square degrees for 226 hours from 2008 to 2012.

The survey explored the structure and content of the Andromeda Galaxy (M31) and its neighbour, the Triangulum Galaxy (M33). Clues to the formation of these galaxies may lie within the vast space being studied. PAndAS searched for this history, hence the term "galactic archaeology".

The project was headed by Dr. Alan McConnachie at the Herzberg Institute of Astrophysics (NRC-HIA), and involved over twenty five investigators from that institute, as well as from universities in Canada, France, the United States, the United Kingdom, Germany, and Australia.

== See also ==
- Extragalactic astronomy
- Observational cosmology
- Andromeda XXI
- Andromeda XXII
