= Andromeda XXI =

Dwarf spheroidal galaxy in constellation Andromeda

Observation data (J2000 epoch)
- Constellation: Andromeda
- Right ascension: 23^{h} 54^{m} 47.7^{s}
- Declination: +42° 28′ 15″
- Distance: 859 ± 51 kiloparsecs (2.80 ± 0.17 Mly)
- Apparent magnitude (V): 15.5 ± 0.3
- Absolute magnitude (V): −9.1 ± 0.3

Characteristics
- Type: dSph
- Half-light radius (physical): 1005±175 pc
- Half-light radius (apparent): 4.1+0.8 −0.4′
- Notable features: Satellite galaxy of Andromeda

Other designations
- Andromeda XXI, And XXI, And 21

Andromeda XXI (And 21, And XXI) is a moderately bright dwarf spheroidal galaxy about 859 ± 51 kiloparsecs (2.80 ± 0.17 Mly) away from the Sun in the constellation Andromeda. It is the fourth largest Local Group dwarf spheroidal galaxy. The discovery arose from the first year data of a photometric survey of the M31/M33 subgroupings of the Local Group by the Pan-Andromeda Archaeological Survey (PAndAS). This survey was conducted with the Megaprime/MegaCam wide-field camera mounted on the Canada-France-Hawaii Telescope.

This large satellite of the Andromeda Galaxy (M31) has a half-light radius of roughly 1 kpc.

Andromeda XXI appears as a spatial overdensity of stars. It has red giant branches at the distance of M31/M33, and follows metal-poor, [Fe/H]=-1.8 when plotted in a color-magnitude diagram.

Like other dwarf spheroidal galaxies, Andromeda XXI shows no sign of current star formation and appears to have had 90% of its stars formed 5.8 billion years ago. Its central dark matter density is lower than expected from the ΛCDM model, but this could be explained if it lost most of its mass in a previous tidal stripping event or had experience tidal shocks from an eccentric orbit.

Although moderately bright (M_{V} = −9.1 ± 0.3), it has low surface brightness. This indicates that numerous relatively luminous M31 satellites remain undiscovered.

== See also ==
- Low surface brightness galaxy (LSB galaxy)
