= Andromeda IX =

Dwarf spheroidal galaxy in the constellation Andromeda

Observation data (J2000 epoch)
- Constellation: Andromeda
- Right ascension: 00^{h} 52^{m} 53.0^{s}
- Declination: +43° 11′ 45″
- Redshift: -216 ± ? km/s
- Distance: 2.50 ± 0.08 Mly (766 ± 25 kpc)
- Apparent magnitude (V): 16.2

Characteristics
- Type: dE
- Notable features: Satellite galaxy M31

Other designations
- And IX, PGC 4689222

Andromeda IX (And 9) is a dwarf spheroidal satellite of the Andromeda Galaxy. It was discovered in 2004 by resolved stellar photometry from the Sloan Digital Sky Survey (SDSS), by Zucker et al. (2004). At the time of its discovery, it was the galaxy with the lowest known surface brightness, Σ_{V} ≃ 26.8mags arcsec^{−2} and the faintest galaxy known from its intrinsic absolute brightness.

It was found from data acquired within an SDSS scan along the major axis of M31, on October 5, 2002. Its distance was estimated to be almost exactly the same as that of M31 by McConnacrchie et al. (2005). Star formation history and dust production in Andromeda IX, as the closest satellite to M31, have also been investigated by Abdollahi et al. (2023).

== See also ==
- List of Andromeda's satellite galaxies
