= School Astronomical Olympiad by Correspondence =

Russian Open School Astronomical Olympiad by Correspondence (ROSAOC) – is an annual international competition for secondary school students in astronomy. Olympiad is being conducted in one theoretical stage by correspondence. The languages of the Olympiad are English and Russian.

Russian Open School Astronomical Olympiad by Correspondence – 2008 started on December 16, 2007. The deadline for paper submission is February, 11th 2008.

Year	Number of participants	Number of countries
2005	26	2
2006	46	7
2007	44	12
2008	54	10

== See also ==
International Astronomy Olympiad
