= WXP (software) =

WXP, the Weather Processor, is a metrological data manipulation and visualization package originally developed at the Department of Earth and Atmospheric Sciences, Purdue University in the 1980s. In 1989, WXP was integrated with Unidata’s Scientific Data Management (SDM) effort and, as part of that SDM package, was distributed to over 40 universities and colleges and ported to a variety of Unix and workstation platforms. WXP was used within the Unidata ecosystem alongside emerging community standards for data formats and display (for example, integration with the Unidata LDM ingest and later support for netCDF and X Windows). It reflects the program’s involvement with the then-current software and interface practices. In 1992, WXP was copyrighted and sold commercially through the Purdue Research Foundation.

WXP version 4 in particular was used by members of the university community to produce weather web site and related educational resources. The primary developer of WXP Dan Vietor developed the wxp.eas.purdue.edu web site, which the WXP project materials describe as one of the early weather-related web sites. According to the current project overview, with Vietor’s move to Unisys, the development of the WXP software continued under Unisys. As of 2020, the WXP website was still up and running, which means the project’s team is likely still maintaining and distributing the software themselves.

Although many developers have contributed to WXP over the years, Dan Vietor is generally regarded as the main contributor. His contributions to WXP were recognized at the 2005 American Meteorological Society Annual Meeting, where he received the Russell L. DeSouza Award from Unidata.

WXP is reported in project documentation as a commercially licensed product. According to the project’s website, WXP has been used to visualize weather data. However, independent proof of its use at schools like College of DuPage and Plymouth State University was not found.
