= Andromeda XXII =

Dwarf galaxy

Observation data (J2000 epoch)
- Constellation: Pisces
- Right ascension: 01^{h} 27^{m} 40^{s}
- Declination: +28° 05′ 25″
- Distance: 940–1,033 kiloparsecs (3.07×10^{6}–3.37×10^{6} ly)
- Apparent magnitude (V): 18.0

Characteristics
- Type: dSph
- Notable features: Satellite galaxy of Triangulum

Other designations
- Andromeda XXII, And XXII, And 22, Pisces VI, Psc VI, Triangulum I, Tri I

Andromeda XXII (Pisces VI, Triangulum I) is a low surface brightness dwarf spheroidal galaxy about 940–1,033 kiloparsecs (3.07×10^{6}–3.37×10^{6} ly) away from the Sun in the constellation Pisces, of the Local Group.

Andromeda XXII is located much closer in projection to M33 than M31 [42 kiloparsecs (140×10^{3} ly) vs. 224 kiloparsecs (730×10^{3} ly)]. This fact suggests that it might be the first Triangulum (M33) satellite ever discovered. However, it is currently catalogued as a satellite of Andromeda (M31).

The discovery arose from the first year data of a photometric survey of the M31/M33 subgrouping of the Local Group by the Pan-Andromeda Archaeological Survey (PAndAS). This survey was conducted with the Megaprime/MegaCam wide-field camera mounted on the Canada-France-Hawaii Telescope.

== See also ==
- Low surface brightness galaxy (LSB galaxy)
- Dwarf spheroidal galaxy (dSph)
- Satellite galaxy
- Triangulum Galaxy
- Andromeda Galaxy
- Pisces constellation
