= Sidney van den Bergh =

Canadian astronomer (born 1929)

- Born: Sidney van den Bergh; 20 May 1929 (age 97); Wassenaar, Netherlands,
- Occupation: Astronomer
- Awards: Order of Canada

Sidney Van den Bergh (born 20 May 1929) is a retired Dutch-Canadian astronomer.

Van den Bergh showed an interest in science from an early age, learning to read with books on astronomy. In addition to being interested in astronomy, he also liked geology and archeology. His parents got him science books, a telescope, and a microscope, although they wished him to pursue a more practical career and only follow astronomy as a hobby. He went to Leiden University in the Netherlands from 1947 to 1948. He then attended Princeton University on scholarship where he received his A.B. in 1950. In December 1950, he was living in Columbus, Ohio and evidencing an interest in Astronomy. He obtained an MSc from Ohio State University (1952) and a Dr. rer. nat. from the University of Göttingen (1956).

Van den Bergh took a faculty position at Ohio State University from 1956 to 1958 before moving to Toronto in 1958 where he spent the first part of his career at the David Dunlap Observatory (DDO) of the University of Toronto. At the DDO, he led innovations that included: expansion of the facilities, utilization of computers, and multicolor photometry. While his areas of focus have included the moon and other parts of the Solar System, he is best known for his work in extragalactic astronomy in which he has published original findings and reviews of nebulae, star clusters, variable stars, supernovae and more recently, an update to the estimated age of the universe. He discovered Andromeda II.

The second part of his career began in 1978 in Victoria, British Columbia, at the Dominion Astrophysical Observatory where he was appointed director in 1977 and took office in 1978, remaining in that position until 1986 when he semi-retired and took the new role of principal research officer. He has served as president of the Canadian Astronomical Society and as vice-president of the International Astronomical Union from 1972 to 1982.

Beginning in 1982, van den Bergh started serving as chairman and president of the board of the Canada-France-Hawaii Telescope Corporation in Hawaii.

== Honours ==
Awards

- Elected Fellow of the Royal Society (1988)
- First National Research Council President's Science Medal (1988)
- Henry Norris Russell Lectureship (1990)
- Killam Prize (1990)
- Appointed officer of the Order of Canada (1994)
- Carlyle S. Beals Award (1998)
- Catherine Wolfe Bruce Gold Medal (2008)
- Gruber Cosmology Prize (2014)

Named after him

- 4230 van den Bergh, a distant Hildan asteroid
- Comet Van den Bergh (discovered by Van den Bergh in 1974)
