= Messier 110 =

Satellite galaxy of the Andromeda Galaxy

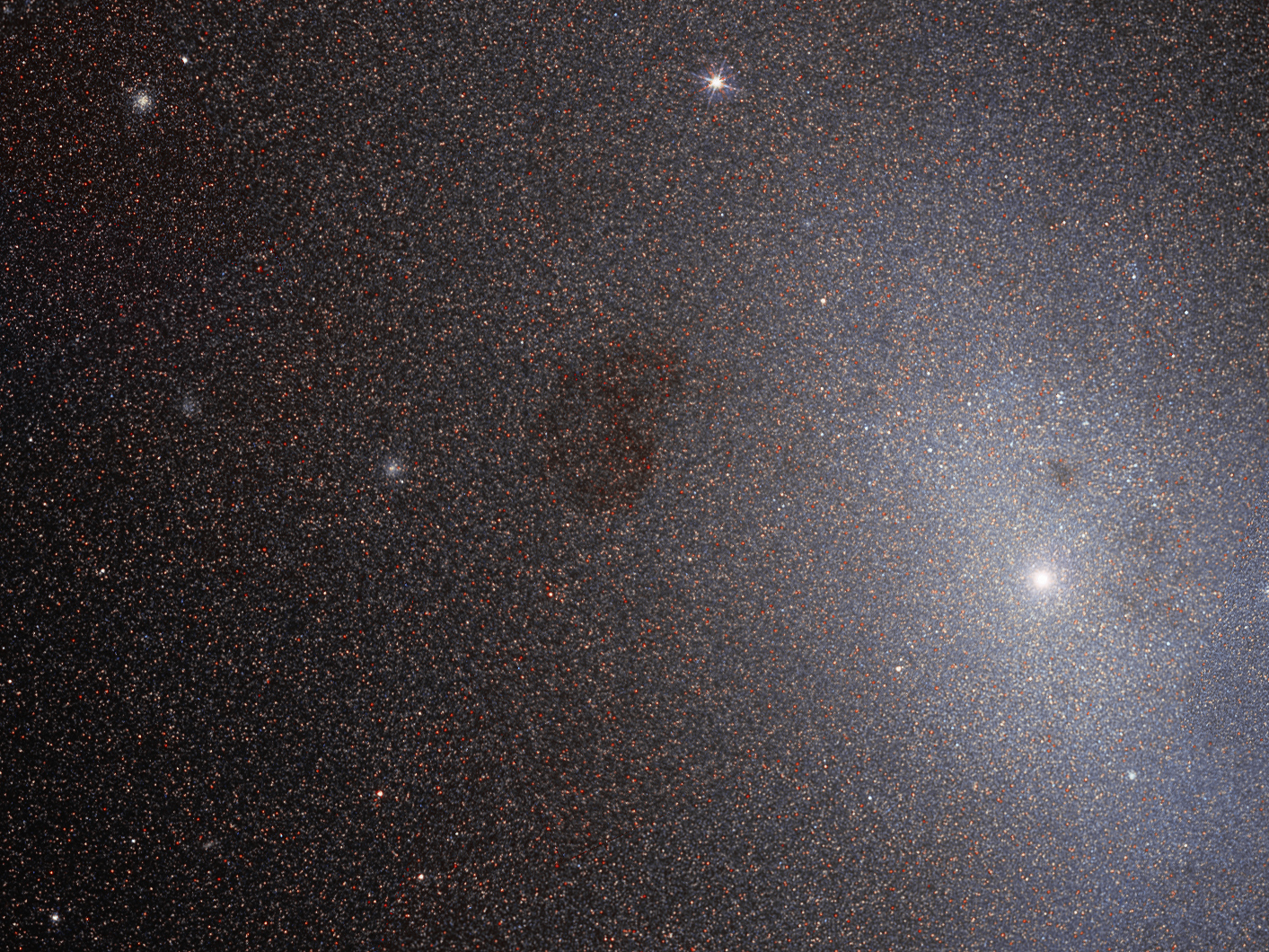
- Dwarf elliptical galaxy Messier 110 in Andromeda

Observation data (J2000 epoch)
- Constellation: Andromeda
- Right ascension: 00^{h} 40^{m} 22.05446^{s}
- Declination: +41° 41′ 07.4963″
- Redshift: −0.000804±0.000010
- Heliocentric radial velocity: −241±3
- Galactocentric velocity: −62±8
- Distance: 2,690 ± 90 kly (825 ± 28 kpc)
- Apparent magnitude (V): 8.5
- Absolute magnitude (V): −16.5

Characteristics
- Type: E5 pec
- Size: 17,050 ly (5.23 kpc) (estimated)
- Apparent size (V): 21′.9 × 11′.0

Other designations
- IRAS 00376+4124, LEDA 2429, M110, MCG +07-02-014, NGC 205, PGC 2429, UGC 426, CGCG 535-014

Messier 110, or M110, also known as NGC 205, is a dwarf elliptical galaxy that is a satellite of the Andromeda Galaxy in the Local Group.

== Early observational history ==
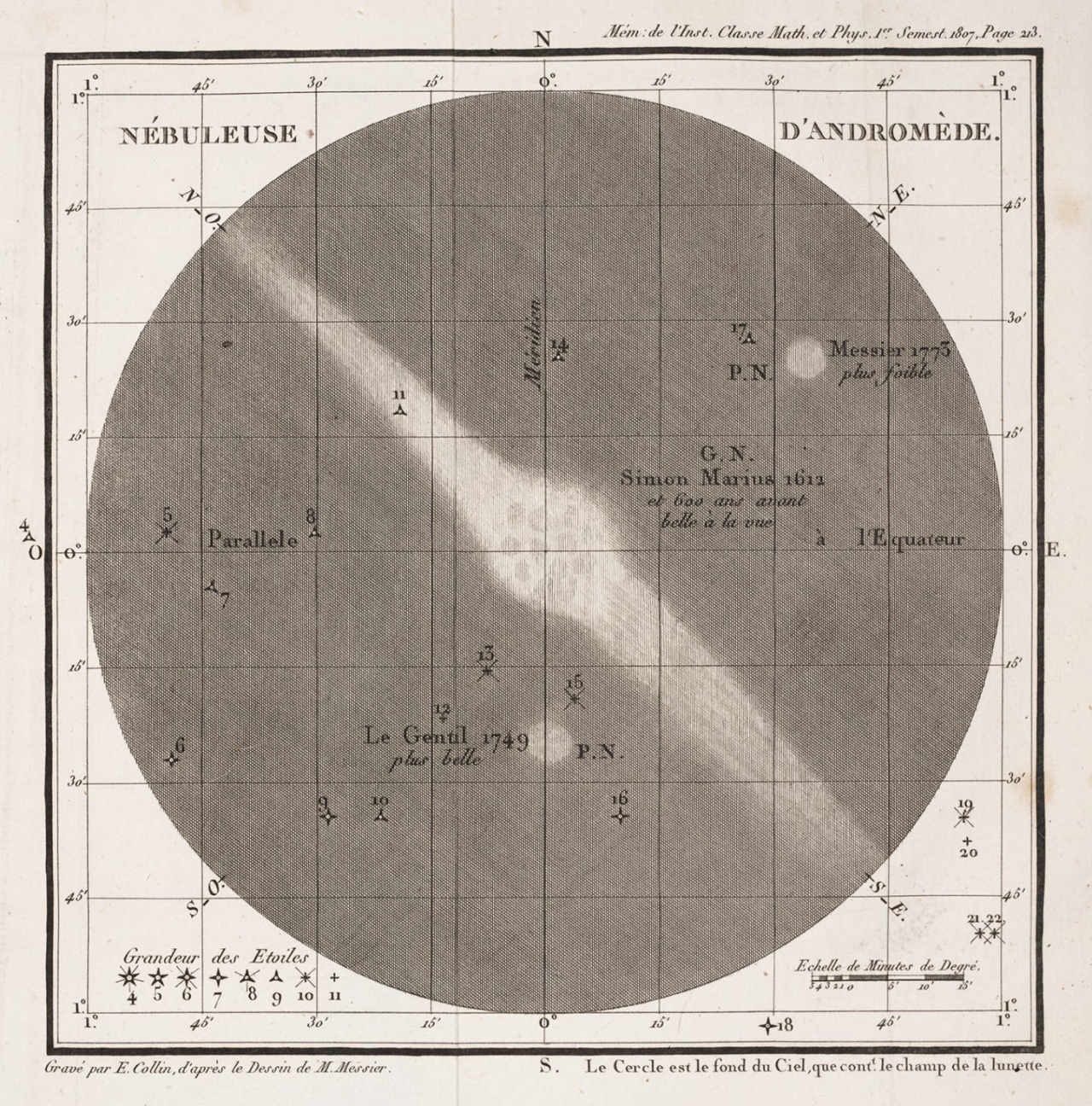
In this drawing by Charles Messier, satellite galaxy M110 appears at the upper right.

Charles Messier never included the galaxy in his list, but it was depicted by him, together with M32, on his drawing of "Nébuleuse D'Andromède", later known as the Andromeda Galaxy. A label of the drawing indicates that Messier first saw the object in 1773. (Note: On August 10.) M110 was independently discovered by Caroline Herschel on August 27, 1783; her brother William Herschel described her discovery in 1785. (Note: These astronomers refer to it as a nebula, per the understanding at the time) The suggestion to assign the galaxy a Messier number was made by Kenneth Glyn Jones in 1967, making it the last member of the Messier List.

== Properties ==
This galaxy has a morphological classification of pec dE5, indicating a dwarf elliptical galaxy with a flattening of 50%. It is designated peculiar (pec) due to patches of dust and young blue stars near its center. This is unusual for dwarf elliptical galaxies in general, and the reason is unclear. Unlike M32, M110 lacks evidence for a supermassive black hole at its center.

The interstellar dust in M110 has a mass of (1.1–1.8)×10^{4} M_{☉} with a temperature of 18–22 K, and the interstellar gas has (4–7)×10^{6} M_{☉}. The inner region has sweeping deficiencies in its interstellar medium (IM), most likely expelled by supernova explosions. Tidal interactions with M31 may have stripped away a significant fraction of the expelled gas and dust, leaving the galaxy as a whole, as it presents, deficient in its IM density.

Novae have been detected in this galaxy, including one discovered in 1999, and another in 2002. The latter, designated EQ J004015.8+414420, had also been captured in images taken by the Sloan Digital Sky Survey (SDSS) that October.

== Local context ==
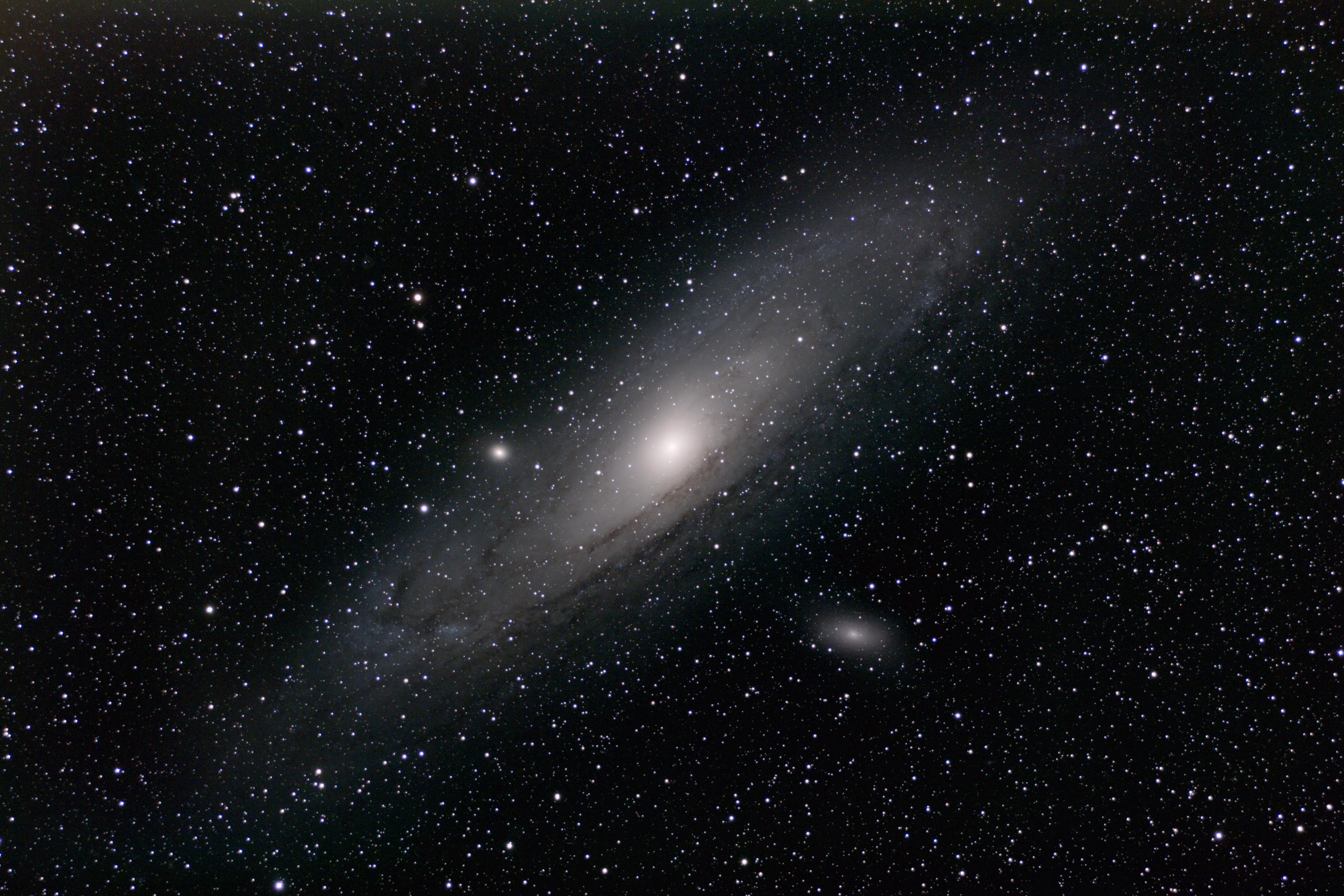
The Andromeda Galaxy and its satellite galaxy, Messier 110, to the bottom-right of the center

About half of the Andromeda's satellite galaxies are orbiting it in a plane, with 14 out of 16 following the same sense of rotation. One model proposes that these 16 once belonged to a subhalo surrounding M110, then the group was broken up by tidal forces during a close encounter with Andromeda.

== See also ==
- List of Messier objects
