= Andromeda Galaxy =

Barred spiral galaxy in the Local Group

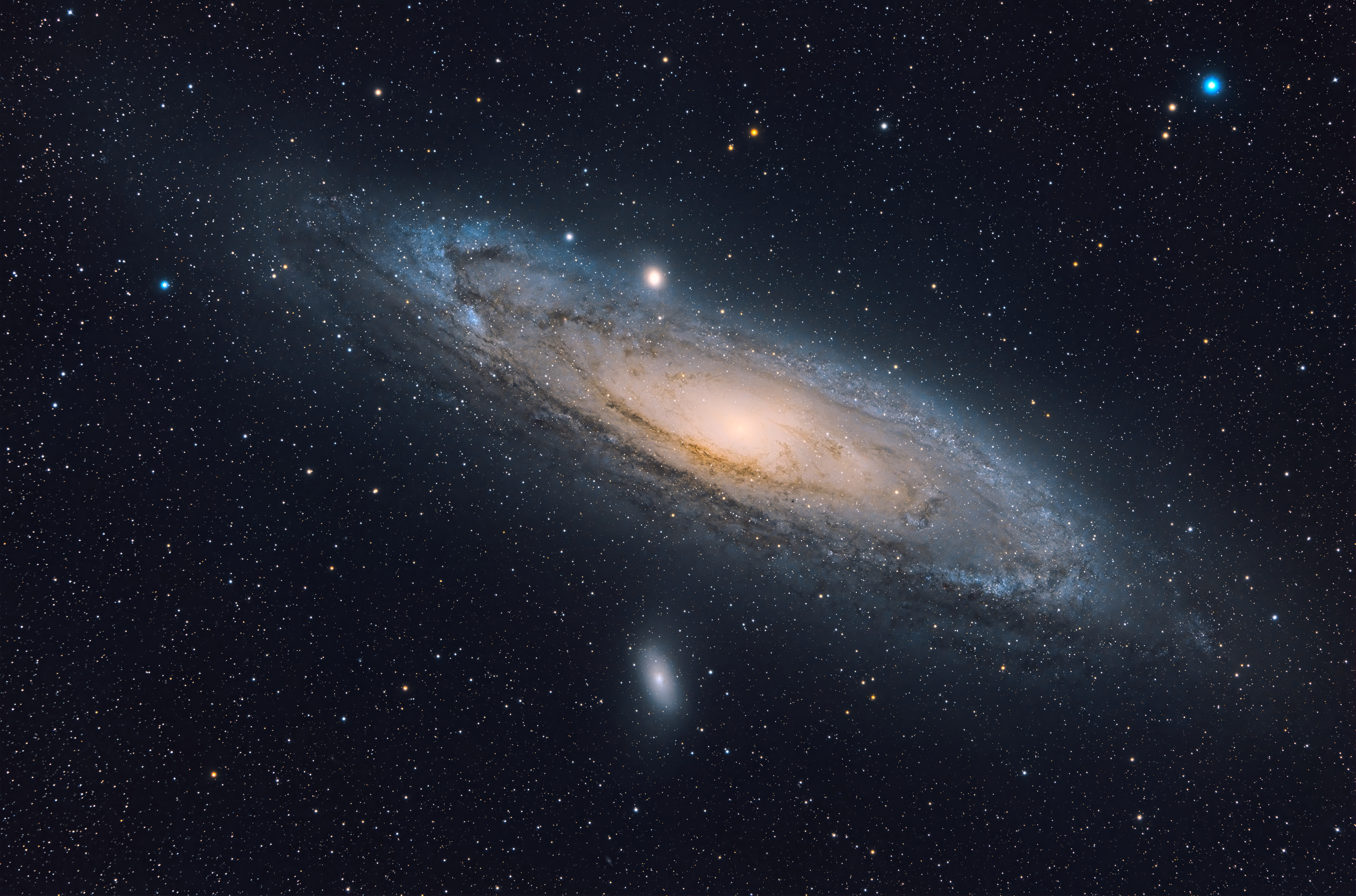
- The Andromeda Galaxy and two satellite galaxies, Messier 32 above the galactic nucleus and Messier 110 below.

Observation data (J2000 epoch)
- Pronunciation: /ænˈdrɒmɪdə/
- Constellation: Andromeda
- Right ascension: 00^{h} 42^{m} 44.3^{s}
- Declination: +41° 16′ 9″
- Redshift: z = −0.001004 (negative sign indicates blueshift)
- Heliocentric radial velocity: −301 ± 1 km/s
- Distance: 752 kpc (2.45 Mly)
- Apparent magnitude (V): 3.44
- Absolute magnitude (V): −21.5 (Note: Blue absolute magnitude of −20.89 – Color index of 0.63 = −21.52)

Characteristics
- Type: SAB(s)b
- Mass: (1.5±0.2)×10^{12} M_{☉}
- Number of stars: ~1 trillion (10^{12})
- Size: 152,000 ly (46.56 kpc) (diameter; D_{25} isophote) (Note: This is the diameter as measured through the D_{25} standard. The halo extends up to a distance of 67.45 kiloparsecs (220,000 ly).)
- Apparent size (V): 3.167° × 1°
- H I scale length (physical): ≥100 kpc (326,000 ly)

Other designations
- M31, NGC 224, UGC 454, PGC 2557, 2C 56 (Core), CGCG 535-17, MCG +07-02-016, IRAS 00400+4059, 2MASX J00424433+4116074, GC 116, h 50, Bode 3, Flamsteed 58, Hevelius 32, Ha 3.3, IRC +40013

The Andromeda Galaxy is a barred spiral galaxy (Note: Although classified as an unbarred spiral in accordance with optical observations by De Vaucoulers et al. (1991), more recent near-infrared observations by Beaton et al. (2007) reveal a boxy bulge at the galactic center. See § Structure for details.) and is the nearest major galaxy to the Milky Way. It was originally named the Andromeda Nebula and is cataloged as Messier 31, M31, and NGC 224. Andromeda has a D_{25} isophotal diameter of about 46.56 kiloparsecs (152,000 light-years) and is approximately 752 kpc (2.5 million light-years) from Earth. The galaxy's name stems from the area of Earth's sky in which it appears, the constellation of Andromeda, which itself is named after the princess who was the wife of Perseus in Greek mythology.

The virial mass of the Andromeda Galaxy is of the same order of magnitude as that of the Milky Way, at 1 trillion solar masses (2.0×10^{42} kilograms). The mass of either galaxy is difficult to estimate with any accuracy, but it was long thought that the Andromeda Galaxy was more massive than the Milky Way by a margin of some 25% to 50%. However, this has been called into question by early-21st-century studies indicating a possibly lower mass for the Andromeda Galaxy and a higher mass for the Milky Way. The Andromeda Galaxy has a diameter of about 46.56 kpc (152,000 ly), making it the largest member of the Local Group of galaxies in terms of extension.

The Milky Way and Andromeda galaxies have about a 50% chance of colliding with each other in the next 10 billion years, potentially merging to form a giant elliptical galaxy or a large lenticular galaxy.

With an apparent magnitude of 3.44, the Andromeda Galaxy is among the brightest of the Messier objects, and is visible to the naked eye from Earth on new moon nights, even when viewed from areas with moderate light pollution.

== Observation history ==
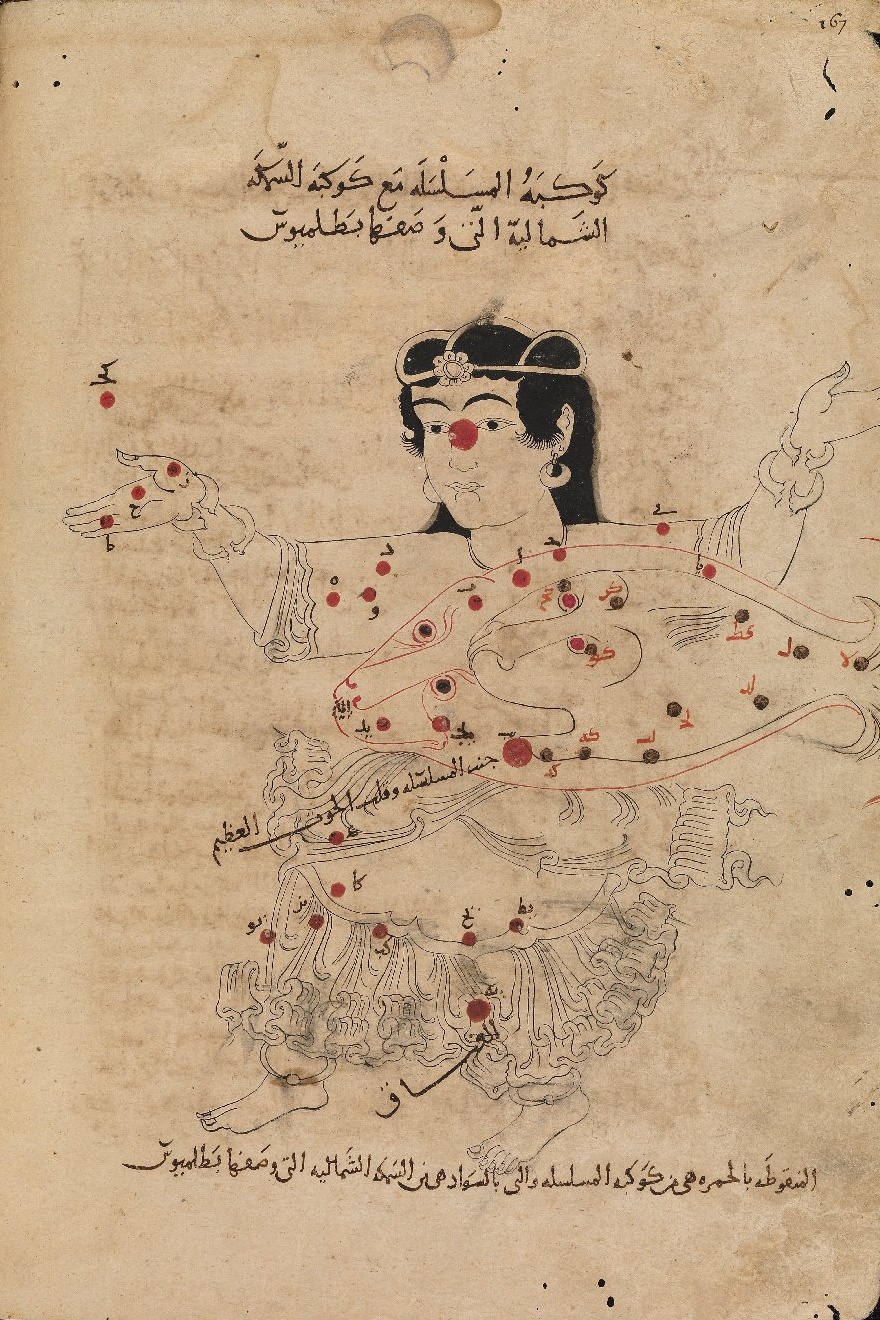
Oldest surviving depiction of the Andromeda (dots at the tip of the mouth of the lower fish), by Al-Sufi in The Book of Fixed Stars (from around 964 CE) in a manuscript from 1009 to 1010 CE

The Andromeda Galaxy is visible to the naked eye in dark skies. Around the year 964 CE, the Persian astronomer Abd al-Rahman al-Sufi described the Andromeda Galaxy in his Book of Fixed Stars as a "nebulous smear" or "small cloud". This was the first historical reference to the Andromeda Galaxy and the earliest known reference to a galaxy other than the Milky Way. Star charts of that period labeled it as the Little Cloud. In 1612, the German astronomer Simon Marius gave an early description of the Andromeda Galaxy based on telescopic observations. John Flamsteed cataloged it as 33 Andromedae. Pierre Louis Maupertuis conjectured in 1745 that the blurry spot was an island universe. Charles Messier cataloged Andromeda as object M31 in 1764 and incorrectly credited Marius as the discoverer despite it being visible to the naked eye. In 1785, the astronomer William Herschel noted a faint reddish hue in the core region of Andromeda. He believed Andromeda to be the nearest of all the "great nebulae," and based on the color and magnitude of the nebula, he incorrectly guessed that it was no more than 2,000 times the distance of Sirius, or roughly 18,000 ly (5.5 kpc).

In 1850, William Parsons, 3rd Earl of Rosse, made a drawing of Andromeda's spiral structure.

In 1864, William Huggins noted that the spectrum of Andromeda differed from that of a gaseous nebula. The spectrum of Andromeda displays a continuum of frequencies, superimposed with dark absorption lines that help identify the chemical composition of an object. Andromeda's spectrum is very similar to the spectra of individual stars, and from this, it was deduced that Andromeda has a stellar nature. In 1885, a supernova (known as S Andromedae) was seen in Andromeda, the only one ever observed in that galaxy. At the time, it was called "Nova 1885"—the difference between "novae" in the modern sense and supernovae was not yet known. Andromeda was considered to be a nearby object, and it was not realized that the "nova" was much brighter than ordinary novae.

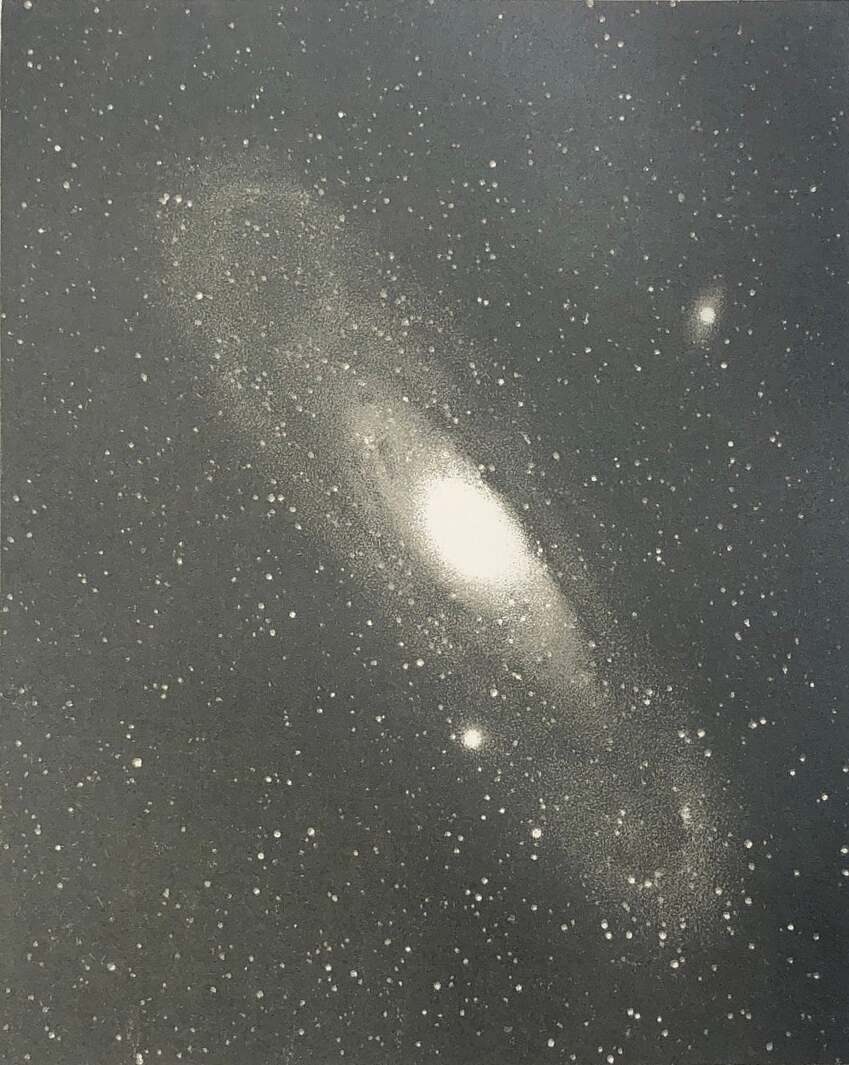
The earliest known photograph of the Great Andromeda "Nebula" (with M110 to the upper right), by Isaac Roberts (29 December 1888)

In 1888, Isaac Roberts took one of the first photographs of Andromeda, which was still commonly thought to be a nebula within the Milky Way galaxy. Roberts mistook Andromeda and similar "spiral nebulae" as star systems being formed.

In 1912, Vesto Slipher used spectroscopy to measure the radial velocity of Andromeda with respect to the Solar System—the largest velocity yet measured, at 300 km/s (190 mi/s).

=== "Island universes" hypothesis ===
Location of the Andromeda Galaxy (M31) in the Andromeda constellation

As early as 1755, the German philosopher Immanuel Kant proposed the hypothesis that the Milky Way is only one of many galaxies in his book Universal Natural History and Theory of the Heavens. Arguing that a structure like the Milky Way would look like a circular nebula viewed from above and like an ellipsoid if viewed from an angle, he concluded that the observed elliptical nebulae like Andromeda, which could not be explained otherwise at the time, were indeed galaxies similar to the Milky Way, not nebulae, as Andromeda was commonly believed to be.

In 1917, Heber Curtis observed a nova within Andromeda. After searching the photographic record, 11 more novae were discovered. Curtis noticed that these novae were, on average, 10 magnitudes fainter than those that occurred elsewhere in the sky. As a result, he was able to come up with a distance estimate of 500,000 ly (32 billion AU). Although this estimate is about fivefold lower than the best estimates available as of the 21st century, it was the first known estimate of the distance to Andromeda that was correct to within an order of magnitude (i.e., to within a factor of ten of the current estimates, which place the distance around 2.5 million light-years). Curtis became a proponent of the so-called "island universes" hypothesis: that spiral nebulae were actually independent galaxies.

In 1920, the Great Debate between Harlow Shapley and Curtis took place concerning the nature of the Milky Way, spiral nebulae, and the dimensions of the universe. To support his claim that the Great Andromeda Nebula is, in fact, an external galaxy, Curtis also noted the appearance of dark lanes within Andromeda that resembled the dust clouds in the Milky Way galaxy, as well as historical observations of the Andromeda Galaxy's significant Doppler shift. In 1922, Ernst Öpik presented a method to estimate the distance of Andromeda using the measured velocities of its stars. His result placed the Andromeda Nebula far outside the Milky Way at a distance of about 450 kpc (1,500 kly). Edwin Hubble settled the debate in 1925 when he identified extragalactic Cepheid variable stars for the first time on astronomical photos of Andromeda. These were made using the 100-inch (2.5 m) Hooker telescope, and they enabled the distance of the Great Andromeda Nebula to be determined. His measurement demonstrated conclusively that this feature was not a cluster of stars and gas within the Milky Way galaxy, but an entirely separate galaxy located a significant distance from the Milky Way.

In 1943, Walter Baade was the first person to resolve stars in the central region of the Andromeda Galaxy. Baade identified two distinct populations of stars based on their metallicity, naming the young, high-velocity stars in the disk Type I and the older, red stars in the bulge Type II. This nomenclature was subsequently adopted for stars within the Milky Way and elsewhere. (The existence of two distinct populations had been noted earlier by Jan Oort.) Baade also discovered that there were two types of Cepheid variable stars, which resulted in doubling the distance estimate to Andromeda, as well as the remainder of the universe.

In 1950, radio emissions from the Andromeda Galaxy were detected by Robert Hanbury Brown and Cyril Hazard at the Jodrell Bank Observatory. The first radio maps of the galaxy were made in the 1950s by John Baldwin and collaborators at the Cambridge Radio Astronomy Group. The core of the Andromeda Galaxy is called 2C 56 in the 2C radio astronomy catalog.

In 1959 rapid rotation of the semi-stellar nucleus of M31 was discovered by Andre Lallemand, M. Duschene and Merle Walker at the Lick Observatory, using the 120-inch telescope, coudé Spectrograph, and Lallemand electronographic camera. They estimated the mass of the nucleus to be about 1.3 × 10^{7} solar masses. The second example of this phenomenon was found in 1961 in the nucleus of M32 by M.F Walker at the Lick Observatory, using the same equipment as used for the discovery of the nucleus of M31. He estimated the nuclear mass to be between 0.8 and 1 × 10^{7} solar masses. Such rotation is now considered to be evidence of the existence of supermassive black holes in the nuclei of these galaxies.

=== 21st century ===
Hubble's Largest Mosaic of Andromeda: (a) Clusters of bright blue stars in the galaxy, background galaxies, and two bright foreground stars inside the Milky Way; (b) NGC 206 the most conspicuous star cloud in Andromeda; (c) A cluster of blue newborn stars; (d) The satellite galaxy M32 may be the residual core of a galaxy that collided with Andromeda; (e) Dark dust lanes across myriad stars.

In 2009, an occurrence of microlensing—a phenomenon caused by the deflection of light by a massive object—may have led to the first discovery of a planet in the Andromeda Galaxy.

In 2020, observations of linearly polarized radio emission with the Westerbork Synthesis Radio Telescope, the Effelsberg 100-m Radio Telescope, and the Very Large Array revealed ordered magnetic fields aligned along the "10-kpc ring" of gas and star formation.

In 2023, amateur astronomers Marcel Drechsler, Xavier Strottner and Yann Sainty announced the discovery of a huge, oxygen-rich emission nebula just south of M31, near the bright star 35 And. This nebula, now classified as SDSO-1, is exceedingly faint, requiring dozens of hours of exposure time minimum to detect, and appears to only emit in oxygen-III. Deep studies of the surrounding regions showed no signs of similarly bright oxygen nebulae near M31, nor any sign of connecting hydrogen filaments to SDSO-1, suggesting a high oxygen-hydrogen ratio. Current research suggests SDSO-1 is extragalactic in nature, specifically caused by interaction between the Milky Way's and M31's circumgalactic halos, although more research is needed to fully understand this object. A later study using spectroscopy found the nebula to be in the Milky Way. One study found the nebula to be a bow shock of a ghost planetary nebula around the binary EG Andromedae.

In 2025, NASA published a huge mosaic made by the Hubble Space Telescope, assembled from approximately 600 separate overlapping fields of view taken over 10 years of Hubble observation. Hubble resolves an estimated 200 million stars that are hotter than the Sun, but still a fraction of the galaxy's total estimated stellar population.

== General ==
The estimated distance of the Andromeda Galaxy from our own was doubled in 1953 when it was discovered that there is a second, dimmer type of Cepheid variable star. In the 1990s, measurements of both standard red giants as well as red clump stars from the Hipparcos satellite measurements were used to calibrate the Cepheid distances.

=== Formation and history ===
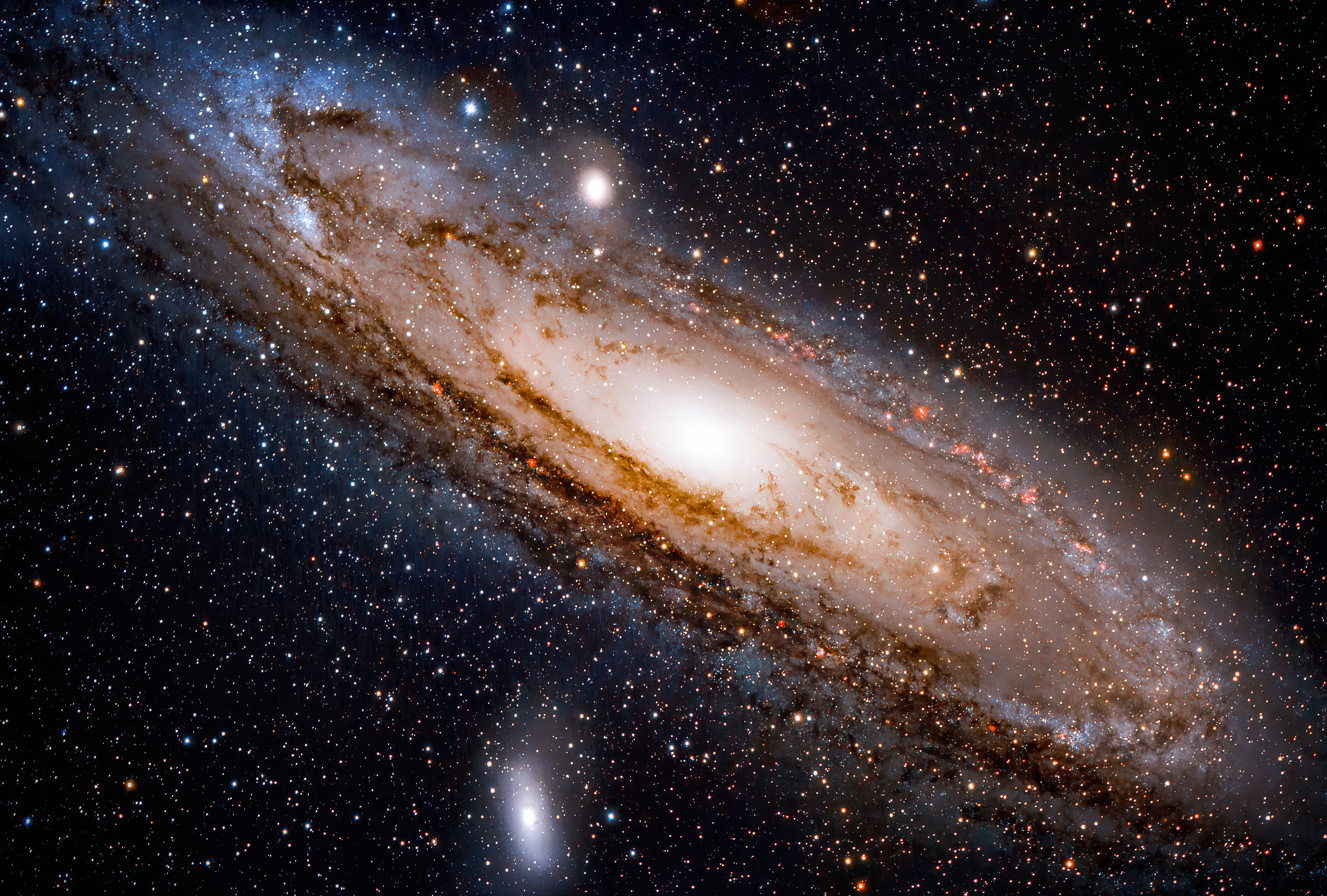
Processed image of the Andromeda Galaxy, with enhancement of H-alpha to highlight its star-forming regions

A major merger occurred 2 to 3 billion years ago at the Andromeda location, involving two galaxies with a mass ratio of approximately 4.

The discovery of a recent merger in the Andromeda Galaxy was first based on interpreting its anomalous age-velocity dispersion relation, as well as the fact that 2 billion years ago, star formation throughout Andromeda's disk was much more active than today.

Modeling of this violent collision shows that it has formed most of the galaxy's (metal-rich) galactic halo, including the Giant Stream, and also the extended thick disk, the young age thin disk, and the static 10 kpc ring. During this epoch, its rate of star formation would have been very high, to the point of becoming a luminous infrared galaxy for roughly 100 million years. Modeling also recovers the bulge profile, the large bar, and the overall halo density profile.

Andromeda and the Triangulum Galaxy (M33) might have had a very close passage 2–4 billion years ago, but it seems unlikely from the last measurements from the Hubble Space Telescope.

=== Distance estimate ===
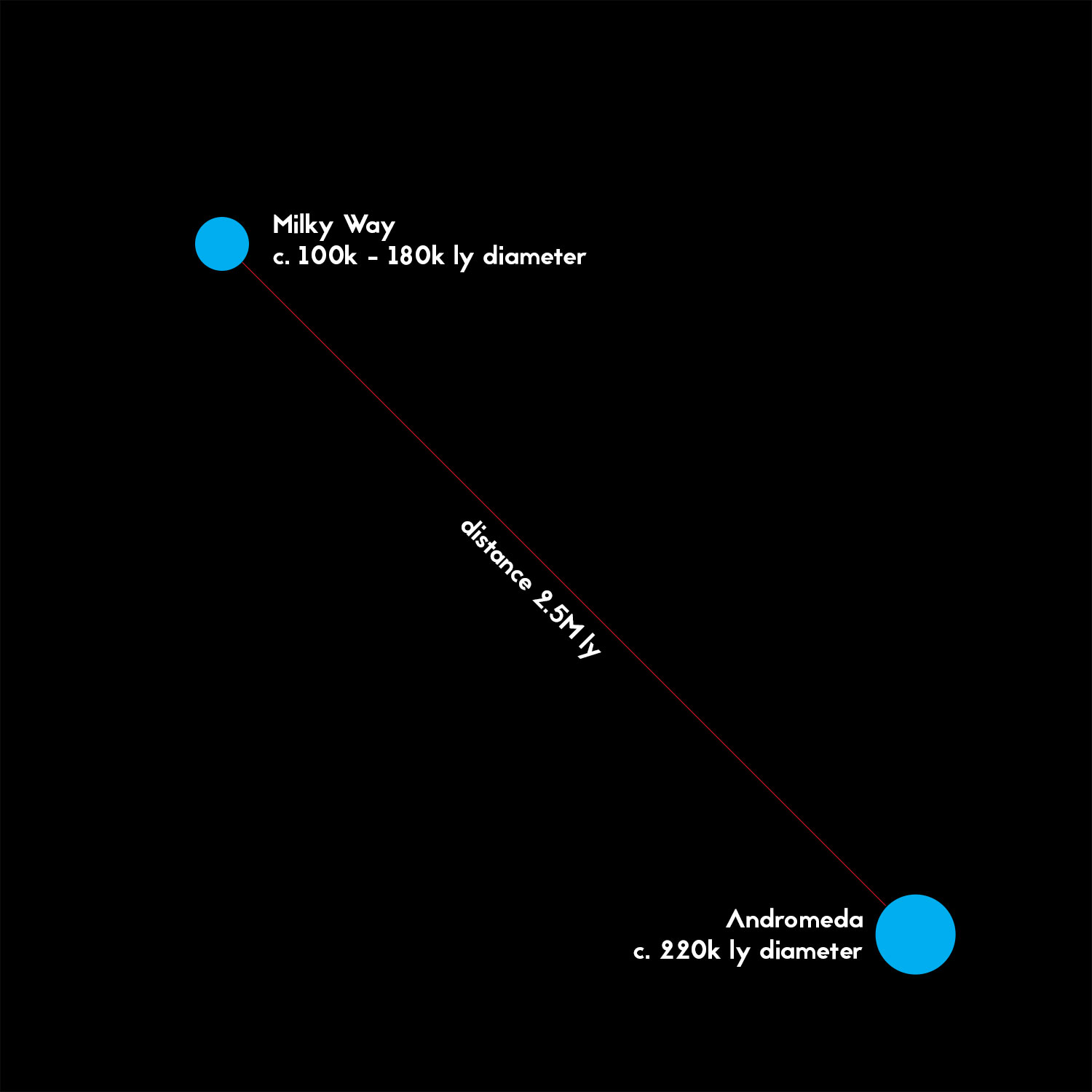
Illustration showing both the size of each galaxy and the distance between the two galaxies, to scale

At least four distinct techniques have been used to estimate distances from Earth to the Andromeda Galaxy. In 2003, using the infrared surface brightness fluctuations (I-SBF) and adjusting for the new period-luminosity value and a metallicity correction of −0.2 mag dex^{−1} in (O/H), an estimate of 2.57 ± 0.06 million ly (162.5 ± 3.8 billion AU) was derived. A 2004 Cepheid variable method estimated the distance to be 2.51 ± 0.13 million light-years (770 ± 40 kpc).

In 2005, an eclipsing binary star was discovered in the Andromeda Galaxy. The binary (Note: J00443799+4129236 is at celestial coordinates R.A. 00^{h} 44^{m} 37.99^{s}, Dec. +41° 29′ 23.6″.) is made up of two hot blue stars of types O and B. By studying the eclipses of the stars, astronomers were able to measure their sizes. Knowing the sizes and temperatures of the stars, they were able to measure their absolute magnitude. When the visual and absolute magnitudes are known, the distance to the star can be calculated. The stars lie at a distance of 2.52 ± 0.14 million ly (159.4 ± 8.9 billion AU) and the whole Andromeda Galaxy at about 2.5 million ly (160 billion AU). This new value is in excellent agreement with the previous, independent Cepheid-based distance value. The TRGB method was also used in 2005 giving a distance of 2.56 ± 0.08 million ly (161.9 ± 5.1 billion AU). Averaged together, these distance estimates give a value of 2.54 ± 0.11 million ly (160.6 ± 7.0 billion AU). (Note: average(787 ± 18, 770 ± 40, 772 ± 44, 783 ± 25) = 1/4 * (787 + 770 + 772 + 783) ± 1/4 * (18^{2} + 40^{2} + 44^{2} + 25^{2})^{0.5} = 778 ± 17.)

=== Mass estimates ===
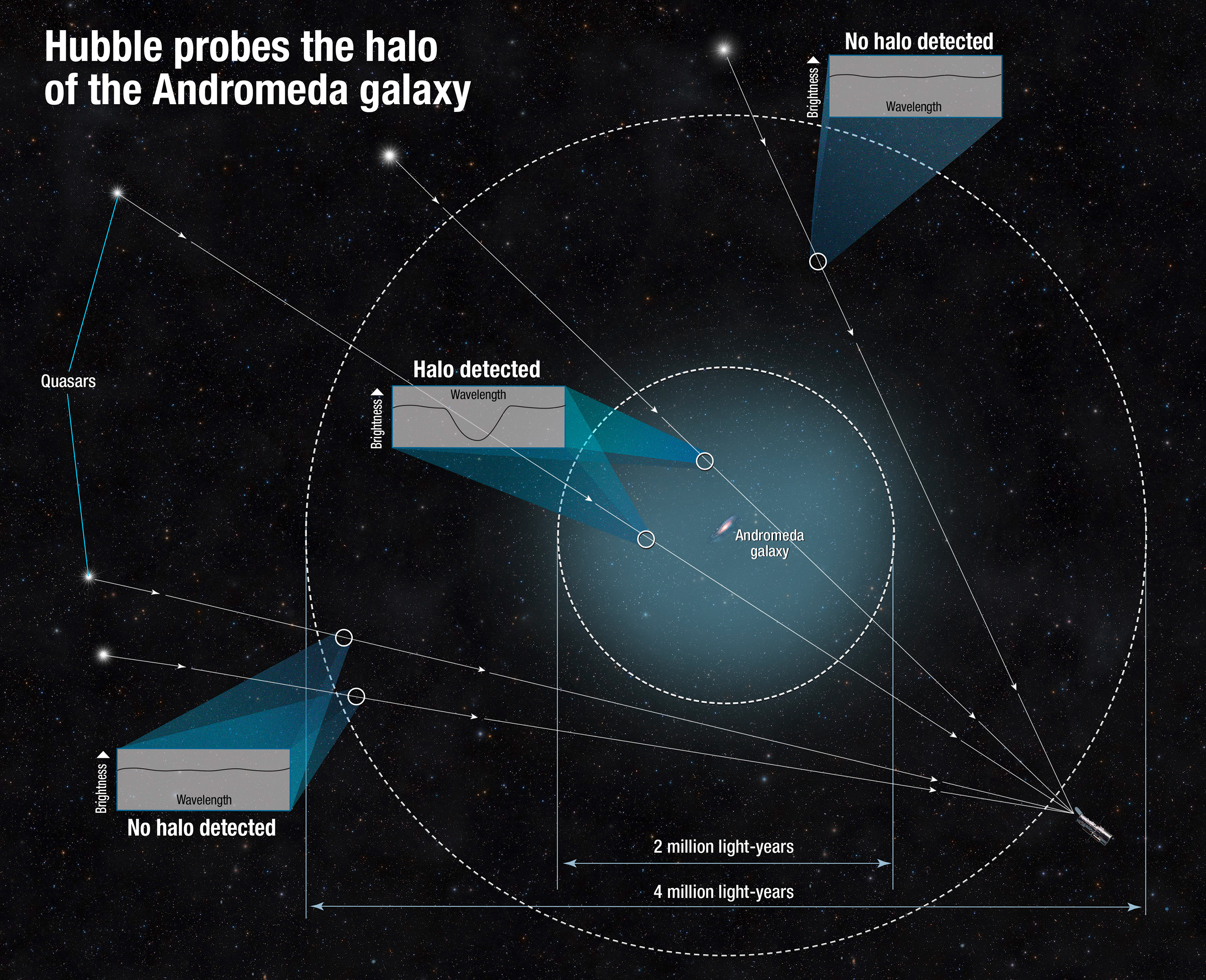
Giant halo around Andromeda Galaxy

Until 2018, mass estimates for the Andromeda Galaxy's halo (including dark matter) gave a value of approximately 1.5×10^{12} M_{☉}, compared to 8×10^{11} M_{☉} for the Milky Way. This contradicted even earlier measurements that seemed to indicate that the Andromeda Galaxy and Milky Way are almost equal in mass. In 2018, the earlier measurements for equality of mass were re-established by radio results as approximately 8×10^{11} M_{☉}. In 2006, the Andromeda Galaxy's spheroid was determined to have a higher stellar density than that of the Milky Way, and its galactic stellar disk was estimated at twice the diameter of that of the Milky Way. The total mass of the Andromeda Galaxy is estimated to be between 8×10^{11} M_{☉} and 1.1×10^{12} M_{☉}. The stellar mass of M31 is 10–15×10^{10} M_{☉}, with 30% of that mass in the central bulge, 56% in the disk, and the remaining 14% in the stellar halo. The radio results (similar mass to the Milky Way Galaxy) should be taken as likeliest as of 2018, although clearly, this matter is still under active investigation by several research groups worldwide.

As of 2019, current calculations based on escape velocity and dynamical mass measurements put the Andromeda Galaxy at 0.8×10^{12} M_{☉}, which is only half of the Milky Way's newer mass, calculated in 2019 at 1.5×10^{12} M_{☉}.

In addition to stars, the Andromeda Galaxy's interstellar medium contains at least 7.2×10^{9} M_{☉} in the form of neutral hydrogen, at least 3.4×10^{8} M_{☉} as molecular hydrogen (within its innermost 10 kiloparsecs), and 5.4×10^{7} M_{☉} of dust.

The Andromeda Galaxy is surrounded by a massive halo of hot gas that is estimated to contain half the mass of the stars in the galaxy. The nearly invisible halo stretches about a million light-years from its host galaxy, halfway to our Milky Way Galaxy. Simulations of galaxies indicate the halo formed at the same time as the Andromeda Galaxy. The halo is enriched in elements heavier than hydrogen and helium, formed from supernovae, and its properties are those expected for a galaxy that lies in the "green valley" of the Galaxy color-magnitude diagram (see below). Supernovae erupt in the Andromeda Galaxy's star-filled disk and eject these heavier elements into space. Over the Andromeda Galaxy's lifetime, nearly half of the heavy elements made by its stars have been ejected far beyond the galaxy's 200,000-light-year-diameter stellar disk.

=== Luminosity estimates ===
The estimated luminosity of the Andromeda Galaxy, ~2.6×10^{10} L_{☉}, is about 25% higher than that of our own galaxy. However, the galaxy has a high inclination as seen from Earth, and its interstellar dust absorbs an unknown amount of light, so it is difficult to estimate its actual brightness and other authors have given other values for the luminosity of the Andromeda Galaxy (some authors even propose it is the second-brightest galaxy within a radius of 10 megaparsecs of the Milky Way, after the Sombrero Galaxy, with an absolute magnitude of around −22.21 (Note: Blue absolute magnitude of −21.58 (see reference) – Color index of 0.63 = absolute visual magnitude of −22.21) or close).

An estimation done with the help of Spitzer Space Telescope published in 2010 suggests an absolute magnitude (in the blue) of −20.89 (that with a color index of +0.63 translates to an absolute visual magnitude of −21.52, compared to −20.9 for the Milky Way), and a total luminosity in that wavelength of 3.64×10^{10} L_{☉}.

The rate of star formation in the Milky Way is much higher, with the Andromeda Galaxy producing only about one solar mass per year compared to 3–5 solar masses for the Milky Way. The rate of novae in the Milky Way is also double that of the Andromeda Galaxy. This suggests that the latter once experienced a great star formation phase, but is now in a relative state of quiescence, whereas the Milky Way is experiencing more active star formation. Should this continue, the luminosity of the Milky Way may eventually overtake that of the Andromeda Galaxy.

According to recent studies, the Andromeda Galaxy lies in what is known in the galaxy color–magnitude diagram as the "green valley", a region populated by galaxies like the Milky Way in transition from the "blue cloud" (galaxies actively forming new stars) to the "red sequence" (galaxies that lack star formation). Star formation activity in green valley galaxies is slowing as they run out of star-forming gas in the interstellar medium. In simulated galaxies with similar properties to the Andromeda Galaxy, star formation is expected to extinguish within about five billion years, even accounting for the expected, short-term increase in the rate of star formation due to the collision between the Andromeda Galaxy and the Milky Way.

== Structure ==
Zooming In on the Andromeda Galaxy – A panorama of foreground stars and the Andromeda Galaxy's nucleus. The image is the largest ever taken by the Hubble Space Telescope.

A narrated tour of the Andromeda Galaxy, made by NASA's Swift satellite team

Based on its appearance in visible light, the Andromeda Galaxy is classified as an SA(s)b galaxy in the de Vaucouleurs–Sandage extended classification system of spiral galaxies. However, infrared data from the 2MASS survey and the Spitzer Space Telescope showed that Andromeda is actually a barred spiral galaxy, like the Milky Way, with Andromeda's bar major axis oriented 55 degrees anti-clockwise from the disc major axis.

There are various methods used in astronomy in defining the size of a galaxy, and each method can yield different results concerning one another. The most commonly employed is the D_{25} standard, the isophote where the photometric brightness of a galaxy in the B-band (445 nm wavelength of light, in the blue part of the visible spectrum) reaches 25 mag/arcsec^{2}. The Third Reference Catalogue of Bright Galaxies (RC3) used this standard for Andromeda in 1991, yielding an isophotal diameter of 46.56 kiloparsecs (152,000 light-years) at a distance of 2.5 million light-years. An earlier estimate from 1981 gave a diameter for Andromeda at 54 kiloparsecs (176,000 light-years).

A study in 2005 by the Keck telescopes shows the existence of a tenuous sprinkle of stars, or galactic halo, extending outward from the galaxy. The stars in this halo behave differently from the ones in Andromeda's main galactic disc, where they show rather disorganized orbital motions as opposed to the stars in the main disc having more orderly orbits and uniform velocities of 200 km/s. This diffuse halo extends outwards away from Andromeda's main disc with the diameter of 67.45 kiloparsecs (220,000 light-years).

The galaxy is inclined an estimated 77° relative to Earth (where an angle of 90° would be edge-on). Analysis of the cross-sectional shape of the galaxy appears to demonstrate a pronounced, S-shaped warp, rather than just a flat disk. A possible cause of such a warp could be gravitational interaction with the satellite galaxies near the Andromeda Galaxy. The Galaxy M33 could be responsible for some warp in Andromeda's arms, though more precise distances and radial velocities are required.

Spectroscopic studies have provided detailed measurements of the rotational velocity of the Andromeda Galaxy as a function of radial distance from the core. The rotational velocity has a maximum value of 225 km/s (140 mi/s) at 1,300 ly (82 million AU) from the core, and it has its minimum possibly as low as 50 km/s (31 mi/s) at 7,000 ly (440 million AU) from the core. Further out, rotational velocity rises out to a radius of 33,000 ly (2.1 billion AU), where it reaches a peak of 250 km/s (160 mi/s). The velocities slowly decline beyond that distance, dropping to around 200 km/s (120 mi/s) at 80,000 ly (5.1 billion AU). These velocity measurements imply a concentrated mass of about 6×10^{9} M_{☉} in the nucleus. The total mass of the galaxy increases linearly out to 45,000 ly (2.8 billion AU), then more slowly beyond that radius.

The spiral arms of the Andromeda Galaxy are outlined by a series of HII regions, first studied in great detail by Walter Baade and described by him as resembling "beads on a string". His studies show two spiral arms that appear to be tightly wound, although they are more widely spaced than in our galaxy. His descriptions of the spiral structure, as each arm crosses the major axis of the Andromeda Galaxy, are as follows:^{pp1062}^{pp92}

Baade's spiral arms of M31
Arms (N=cross M31's major axis at north, S=cross M31's major axis at south)	Distance from center (arcminutes) (N*/S*)	Distance from the center (kpc) (N*/S*)	Notes
N1/S1	3.4/1.7	0.7/0.4	Dust arms with no OB associations of HII regions
N2/S2	8.0/10.0	1.7/2.1	Dust arms with some OB associations
N3/S3	25/30	5.3/6.3	As per N2/S2, but with some HII regions too
N4/S4	50/47	11/9.9	Large numbers of OB associations, HII regions, and little dust
N5/S5	70/66	15/14	As per N4/S4 but much fainter
N6/S6	91/95	19/20	Loose OB associations. No dust is visible.
N7/S7	110/116	23/24	As per N6/S6 but fainter and inconspicuous

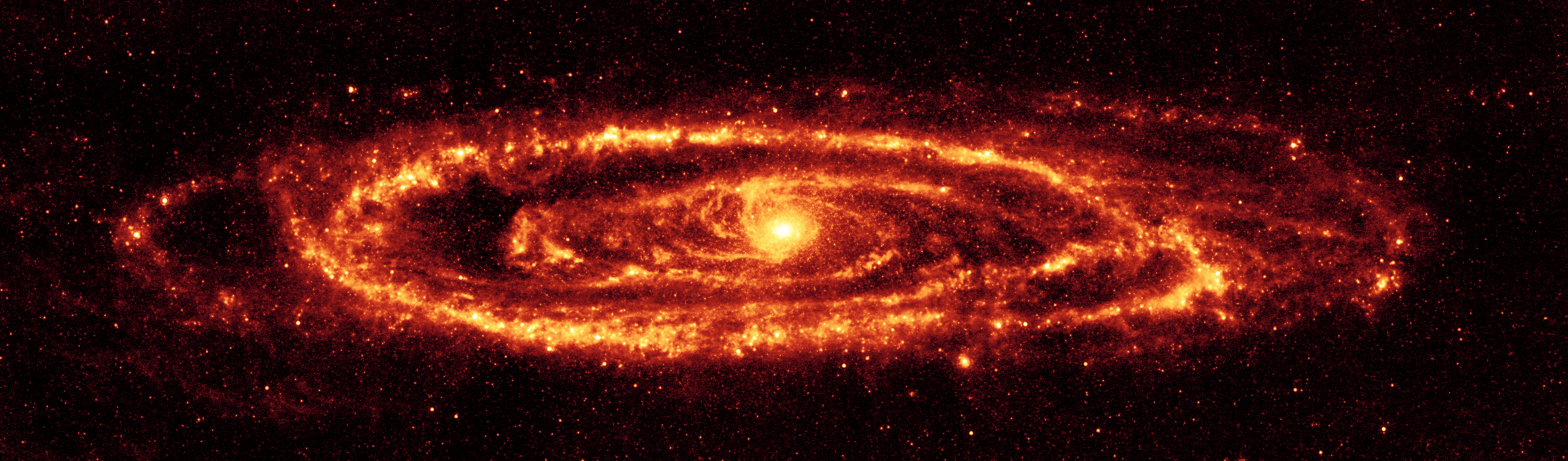
Image of the Andromeda Galaxy taken by Spitzer in infrared, 24 micrometres (Credit: NASA/JPL–Caltech/Karl D. Gordon, University of Arizona)

Since the Andromeda Galaxy is seen close to edge-on, it is difficult to study its spiral structure. Rectified images of the galaxy seem to show a fairly normal spiral galaxy, exhibiting two continuous trailing arms that are separated from each other by a minimum of about 13,000 ly (820 million AU) and that can be followed outward from a distance of roughly 1,600 ly (100 million AU) from the core. Alternative spiral structures have been proposed such as a single spiral arm or a flocculent pattern of long, filamentary, and thick spiral arms.

The most likely cause of the distortions of the spiral pattern is thought to be interaction with galaxy satellites M32 and M110. This can be seen by the displacement of the neutral hydrogen clouds from the stars.

In 1998, images from the European Space Agency's Infrared Space Observatory demonstrated that the overall form of the Andromeda Galaxy may be transitioning into a ring galaxy. The gas and dust within the galaxy are generally formed into several overlapping rings, with a particularly prominent ring formed at a radius of 32,000 ly (9.8 kpc) from the core, nicknamed by some astronomers the ring of fire. This ring is hidden from visible light images of the galaxy because it is composed primarily of cold dust, and most of the star formation that is taking place in the Andromeda Galaxy is concentrated there.

Later studies with the help of the Spitzer Space Telescope showed how the Andromeda Galaxy's spiral structure in the infrared appears to be composed of two spiral arms that emerge from a central bar and continue beyond the large ring mentioned above. Those arms, however, are not continuous and have a segmented structure.

Close examination of the inner region of the Andromeda Galaxy with the same telescope also showed a smaller dust ring that is believed to have been caused by the interaction with M32 more than 200 million years ago. Simulations show that the smaller galaxy passed through the disk of the Andromeda Galaxy along the latter's polar axis. This collision stripped more than half the mass from the smaller M32 and created the ring structures in Andromeda. It is the co-existence of the long-known large ring-like feature in the gas of Messier 31, together with this newly discovered inner ring-like structure, offset from the barycenter, that suggested a nearly head-on collision with the satellite M32, a milder version of the Cartwheel encounter.

Studies of the extended halo of the Andromeda Galaxy show that it is roughly comparable to that of the Milky Way, with stars in the halo being generally "metal-poor", and increasingly so with greater distance. This evidence indicates that the two galaxies have followed similar evolutionary paths. They are likely to have accreted and assimilated about 100–200 low-mass galaxies during the past 12 billion years. The stars in the extended halos of the Andromeda Galaxy and the Milky Way may extend nearly one-third the distance separating the two galaxies.

=== Nucleus ===
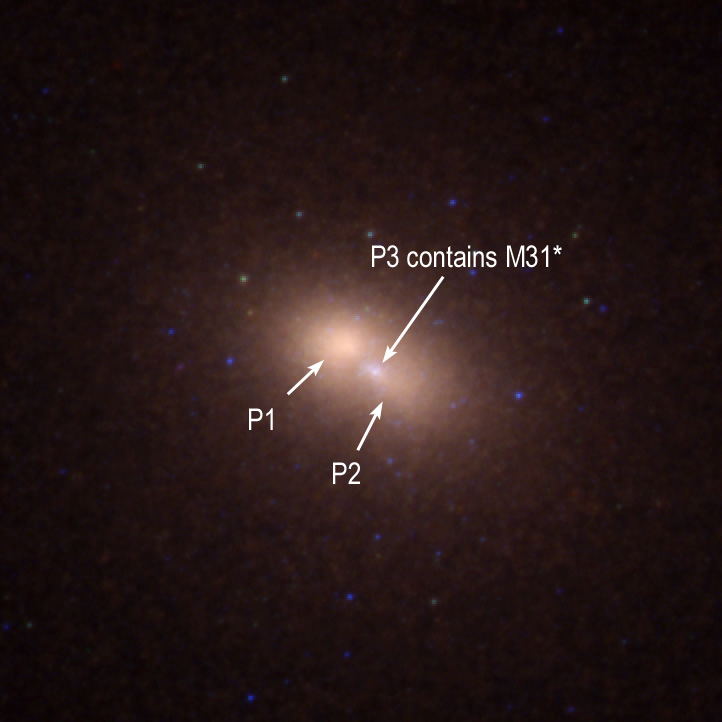
Hubble Space Telescope image of the Andromeda Galaxy core showing P1, P2 and P3, with P3 containing M31*. NASA/ESA photo

The Andromeda Galaxy is known to harbor a dense and compact star cluster at its very center, similar to the Milky Way galaxy. A large telescope creates a visual impression of a star embedded in the more diffuse surrounding bulge. In 1991, the Hubble Space Telescope was used to image the Andromeda Galaxy's inner nucleus. The nucleus consists of two concentrations separated by 1.5 pc (4.9 ly). The brighter concentration, designated as P1, is offset from the center of the galaxy. The dimmer concentration, P2, falls at the true center of the galaxy and contains an embedded star cluster, called P3, containing many UV-bright A-type stars and the supermassive black hole, called M31*. The black hole is classified as a low-luminosity AGN (LLAGN) and it was detected only in radio wavelengths and in x-rays. It was quiescent in 2004–2005, but it was highly variable in 2006–2007. An additional x-ray flare occurred in 2013. The mass of M31* was measured at 3–5 × 10^{7} M_{☉} in 1993, and at 1.1–2.3 × 10^{8} M_{☉} in 2005. The velocity dispersion of material around it is measured to be ≈ 160 km/s (100 mi/s).

It has been proposed that the observed double nucleus could be explained if P1 is the projection of a disk of stars in an eccentric orbit around the central black hole. The eccentricity is such that stars linger at the orbital apocenter, creating a concentration of stars. It has been postulated that such an eccentric disk could have been formed from the result of a previous black hole merger, where the release of gravitational waves could have "kicked" the stars into their current eccentric distribution. P2 also contains a compact disk of hot, spectral-class A stars. The A stars are not evident in redder filters, but in blue and ultraviolet light they dominate the nucleus, causing P2 to appear more prominent than P1.

While at the initial time of its discovery it was hypothesized that the brighter portion of the double nucleus is the remnant of a small galaxy "cannibalized" by the Andromeda Galaxy, this is no longer considered a viable explanation, largely because such a nucleus would have an exceedingly short lifetime due to tidal disruption by the central black hole. While this could be partially resolved if P1 had its own black hole to stabilize it, the distribution of stars in P1 does not suggest that there is a black hole at its center.

== Discrete sources ==
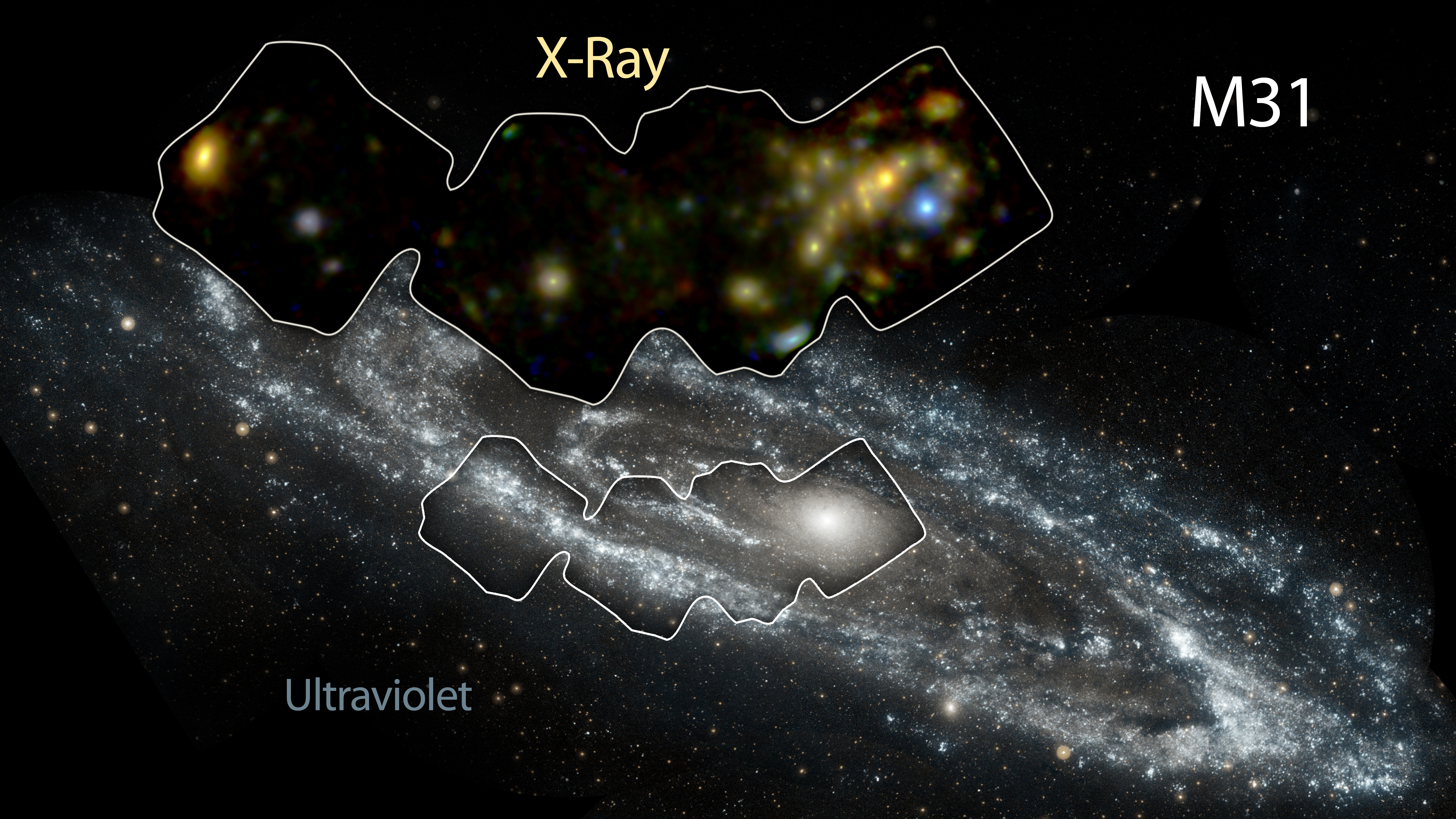
The Andromeda Galaxy in high-energy X-ray and ultraviolet light (released 5 January 2016)

By late 1968, no X-rays had been detected from the Andromeda Galaxy. A balloon flight on 20 October 1970 set an upper limit for detectable hard X-rays from the Andromeda Galaxy. The Swift BAT all-sky survey successfully detected hard X-rays coming from a region centered 6 arcseconds away from the galaxy center. The emission above 25 keV was later found to be originating from a single source named 3XMM J004232.1+411314, and identified as a binary system containing a neutron star accreting matter from another star.

Multiple X-ray sources have since been detected in the Andromeda Galaxy, using observations from the European Space Agency's (ESA) XMM-Newton orbiting observatory. Robin Barnard et al. hypothesized that these are candidate black holes or neutron stars, which are heating the incoming gas to millions of kelvins and emitting X-rays. Neutron stars and black holes can be distinguished mainly by measuring their masses. An observation campaign of NuSTAR space mission identified 40 objects of this kind in the galaxy. In 2012, a microquasar, a radio burst emanating from a smaller black hole was detected in the Andromeda Galaxy. The progenitor black hole is located near the galactic center and has about 10 M_{☉}. It was discovered through data collected by the European Space Agency's XMM-Newton probe and was subsequently observed by NASA's Swift Gamma-Ray Burst Mission and Chandra X-Ray Observatory, the Very Large Array, and the Very Long Baseline Array. The microquasar was the first observed within the Andromeda Galaxy and the first outside of the Milky Way Galaxy.

== Globular clusters ==
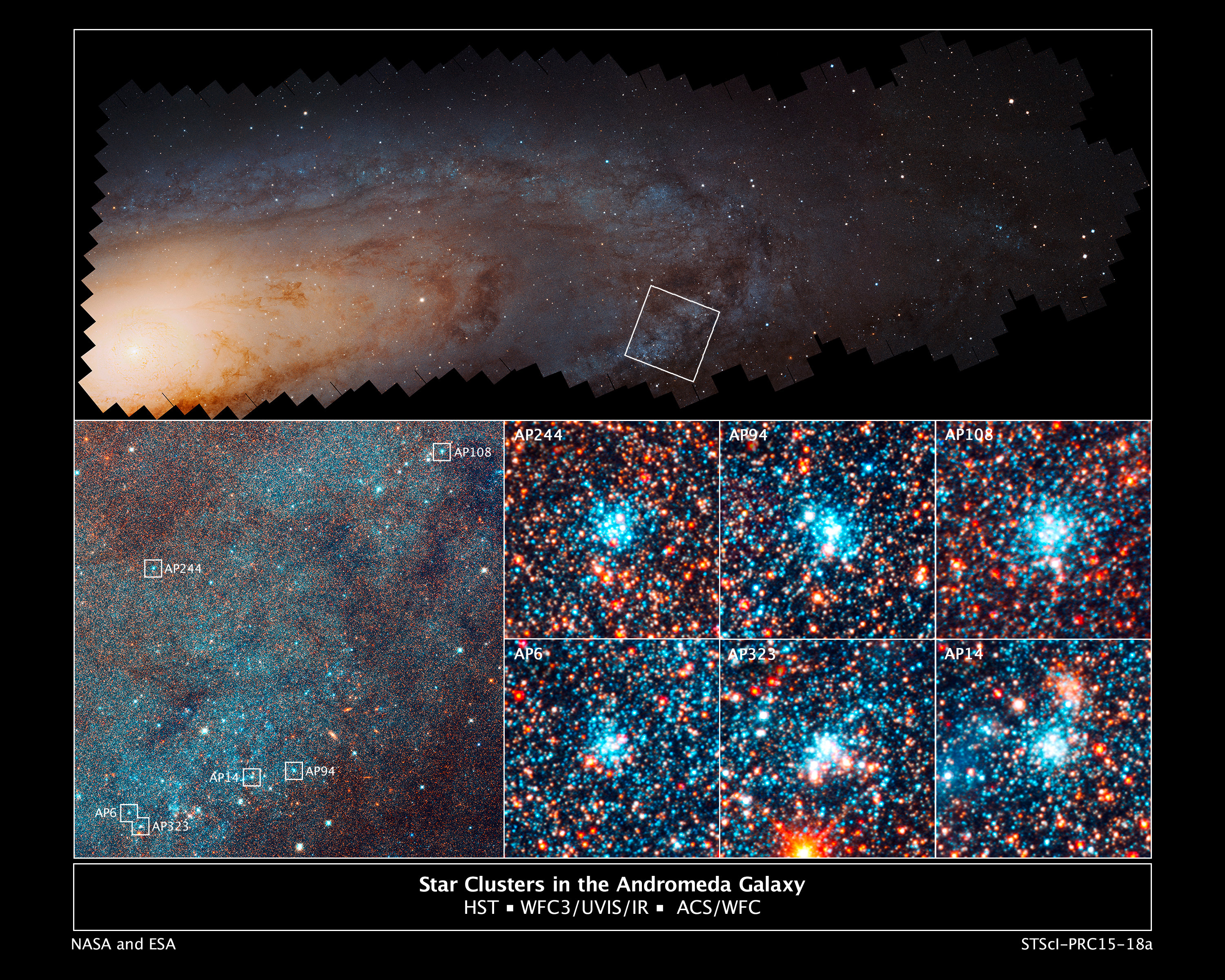
Star clusters in the Andromeda Galaxy

There are approximately 460 globular clusters associated with the Andromeda Galaxy. The most massive of these clusters, identified as Mayall II, nicknamed Globular One, has a greater luminosity than any other known globular cluster in the Local Group of galaxies. It contains several million stars and is about twice as luminous as Omega Centauri, the brightest known globular cluster in the Milky Way. Mayall II (also known as Globular One or G1) has several stellar populations and a structure too massive for an ordinary globular. As a result, some consider Mayall II to be the remnant core of a dwarf galaxy that was consumed by Andromeda in the distant past. The cluster with the greatest apparent brightness is G76 which is located in the southwest arm's eastern half. Another massive globular cluster, named 037-B327 (also known as Bol 37) and discovered in 2006 as is heavily reddened by the Andromeda Galaxy's interstellar dust, was thought to be more massive than Mayall II and the largest cluster of the Local Group; however, other studies have shown it is actually similar in properties to Mayall II.

Unlike the globular clusters of the Milky Way, which show a relatively low age dispersion, Andromeda Galaxy's globular clusters have a much larger range of ages: from systems as old as the galaxy itself to much younger systems, with ages between a few hundred million years to five billion years.

In 2005, astronomers discovered a completely new type of star cluster in the Andromeda Galaxy. The new-found clusters contain hundreds of thousands of stars, a similar number of stars that can be found in globular clusters. What distinguishes them from the globular clusters is that they are much larger—several hundred light-years across—and hundreds of times less dense. The distances between the stars are, therefore, much greater within the newly discovered extended clusters.

The most massive globular cluster in the Andromeda Galaxy, B023-G078, likely has a central intermediate black hole of almost 100,000 solar masses.

=== PA-99-N2 event and possible exoplanet in galaxy ===
PA-99-N2 was a microlensing event detected in the Andromeda Galaxy in 1999. One of the explanations for this is the gravitational lensing of a red giant by a star with a mass between 0.02 and 3.6 times that of the Sun, which suggested that the star is likely orbited by a planet. This possible exoplanet would have a mass 6.34 times that of Jupiter. If finally confirmed, it would be the first ever found extragalactic planet. However, anomalies in the event were later found.

== Nearby and satellite galaxies ==
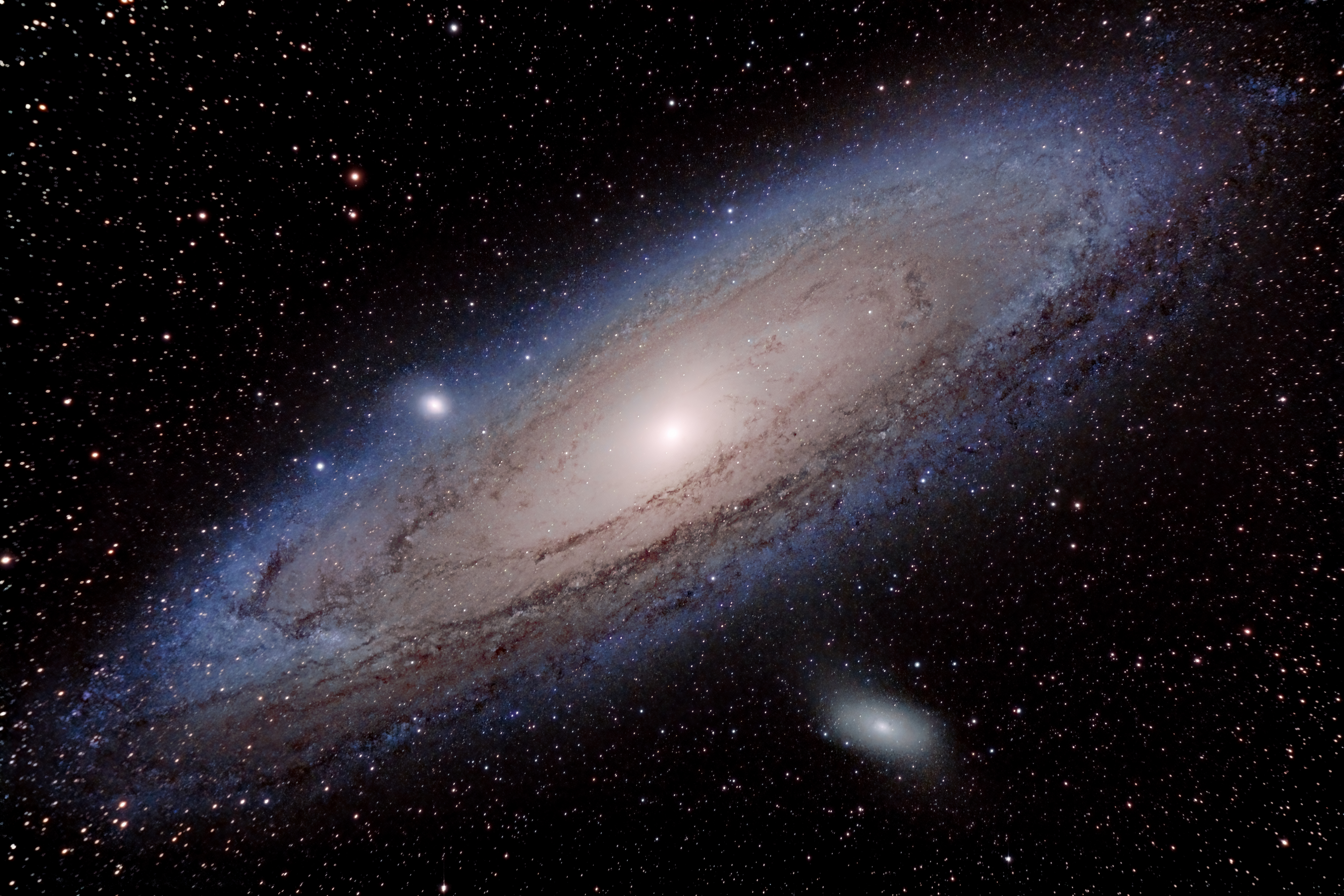
The Andromeda Galaxy with satellite galaxies M32 (center left above the galactic nucleus) and M110 (center right below the galaxy)

Like the Milky Way, the Andromeda Galaxy has smaller satellite galaxies, consisting of over 20 known dwarf galaxies. The Andromeda Galaxy's dwarf galaxy population is very similar to the Milky Way's, but the galaxies are much more numerous. The best-known and most readily observed satellite galaxies are M32 and M110. Based on current evidence, it appears that M32 underwent a close encounter with the Andromeda Galaxy in the past. M32 may once have been a larger galaxy that had its stellar disk removed by M31 and underwent a sharp increase of star formation in the core region, which lasted until the relatively recent past.

M110 also appears to be interacting with the Andromeda Galaxy, and astronomers have found in the halo of the latter a stream of metal-rich stars that appear to have been stripped from these satellite galaxies. M110 does contain a dusty lane, which may indicate recent or ongoing star formation. M32 has a young stellar population as well.

The Triangulum Galaxy is a non-dwarf galaxy that lies 750,000 light-years from Andromeda. It is currently unknown whether it is a satellite of Andromeda.

In 2006, it was discovered that nine of the satellite galaxies lie in a plane that intersects the core of the Andromeda Galaxy; they are not randomly arranged as would be expected from independent interactions. This may indicate a common tidal origin for the satellites.

== Collision with the Milky Way ==
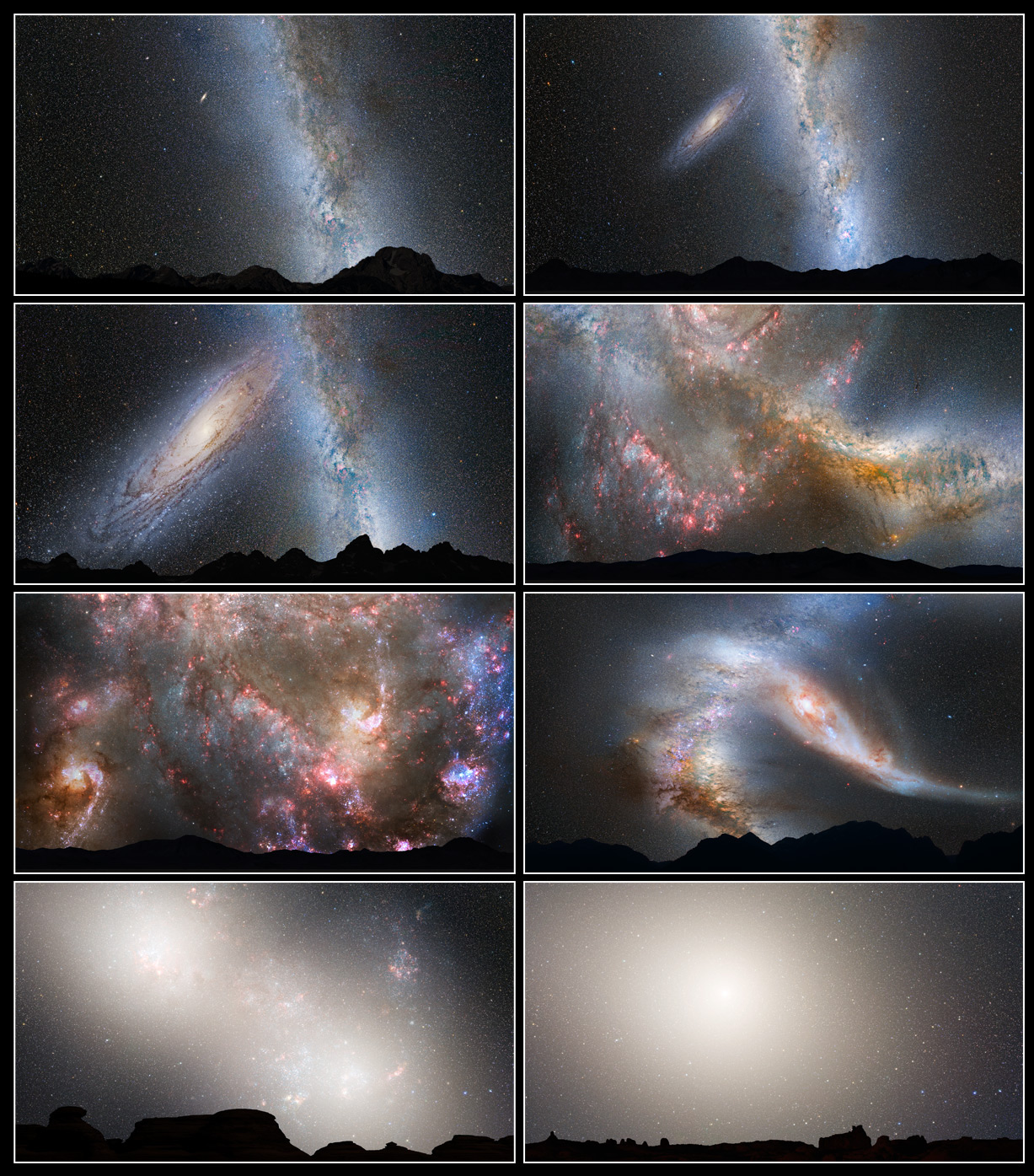
This series of photo illustrations shows a possible predicted merger between the Milky Way Galaxy and the neighboring Andromeda Galaxy.

The Andromeda Galaxy is approaching the Milky Way at about 110 kilometres (68 miles) per second. It has been measured approaching relative to the Sun at around 300 km/s (190 mi/s) as the Sun orbits around the center of the galaxy at a speed of approximately 225 km/s (140 mi/s). This makes the Andromeda Galaxy one of about 100 observable blueshifted galaxies. Andromeda Galaxy's tangential or sideways velocity concerning the Milky Way is uncertain, but estimated to be smaller than the approaching velocity. After the sideways velocity was first measured, Andromeda was predicted to collide directly with the Milky Way in about 4 billion years. However, later calculations, including a higher sideways velocity measurement from the Gaia spacecraft and the effect of other Local Group galaxies found a much lower probability of a merger.

A likely outcome of the collision would be that the galaxies will merge to form a giant elliptical galaxy or possibly large disc galaxy. Such events are frequent among the galaxies in galaxy groups. The fate of Earth and the Solar System in the event of a collision is currently unknown. Before the galaxies merge, there is a small chance that the Solar System could be ejected from the Milky Way or join the Andromeda Galaxy.

== Amateur observation ==
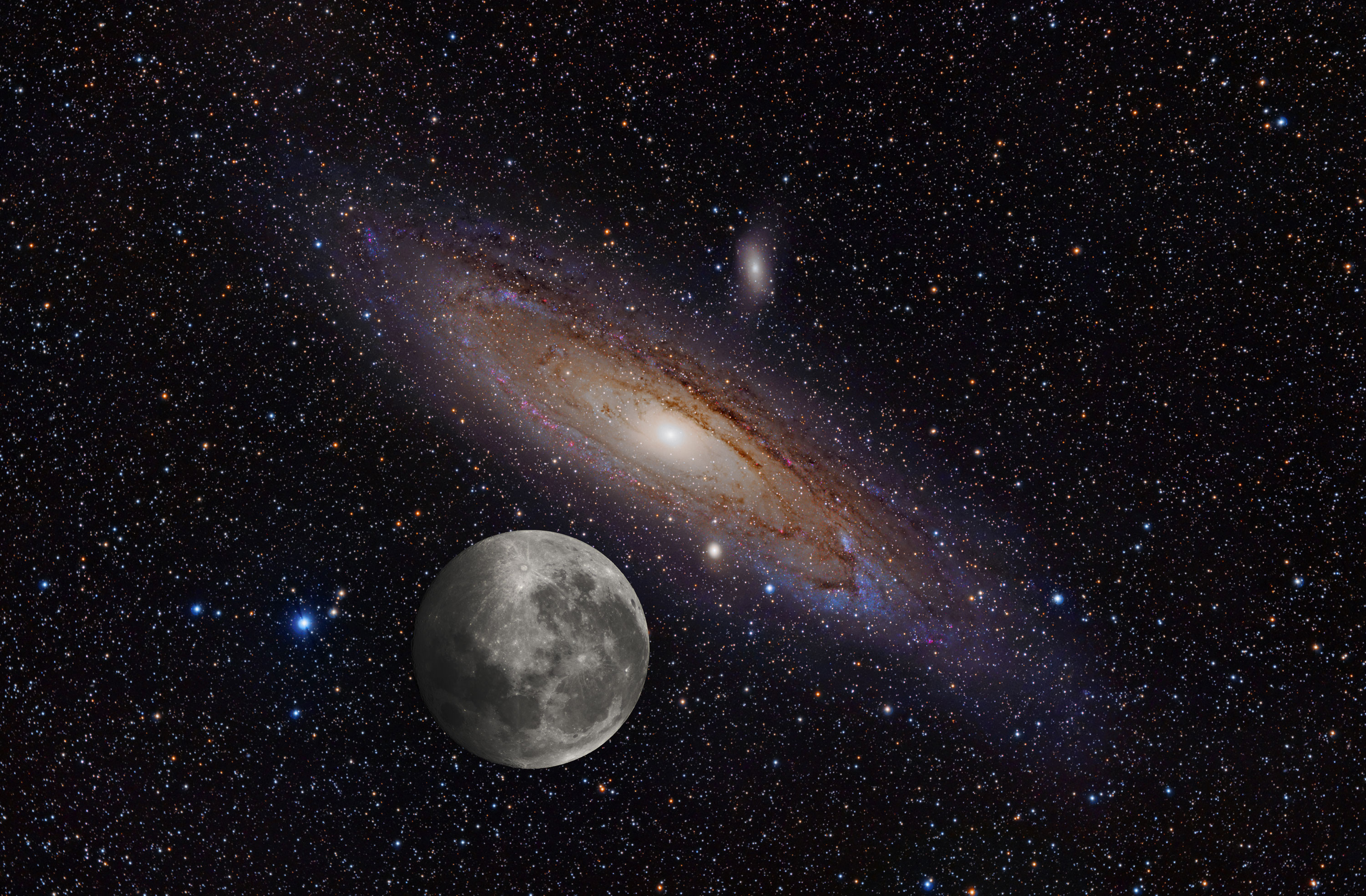
Superimposition showing sizes of the Moon and Andromeda Galaxy as seen from Earth. This image shows much more of the galaxy's darker outer regions than an amateur observer can see.

Under most viewing conditions, the Andromeda Galaxy is one of the most distant objects that can be seen with the naked eye, due to its sheer size. (M33 and, for observers with exceptionally good vision, M81 can be seen under very dark skies.) The constellation of Andromeda, in which the galaxy is located, is usually found with the aid of the constellations Cassiopeia or Pegasus, which are usually easier to recognize at first glance. Andromeda is best seen during autumn nights in the Northern Hemisphere when it passes high overhead, reaching its highest point around midnight in October, and two hours earlier each successive month. In the early evening, it rises in the east in September and sets in the west in February. From the Southern Hemisphere the Andromeda Galaxy is visible between October and December, best viewed from as far north as possible. Binoculars can reveal some larger structures of the galaxy and its two brightest satellite galaxies, M32 and M110.

== Gallery ==
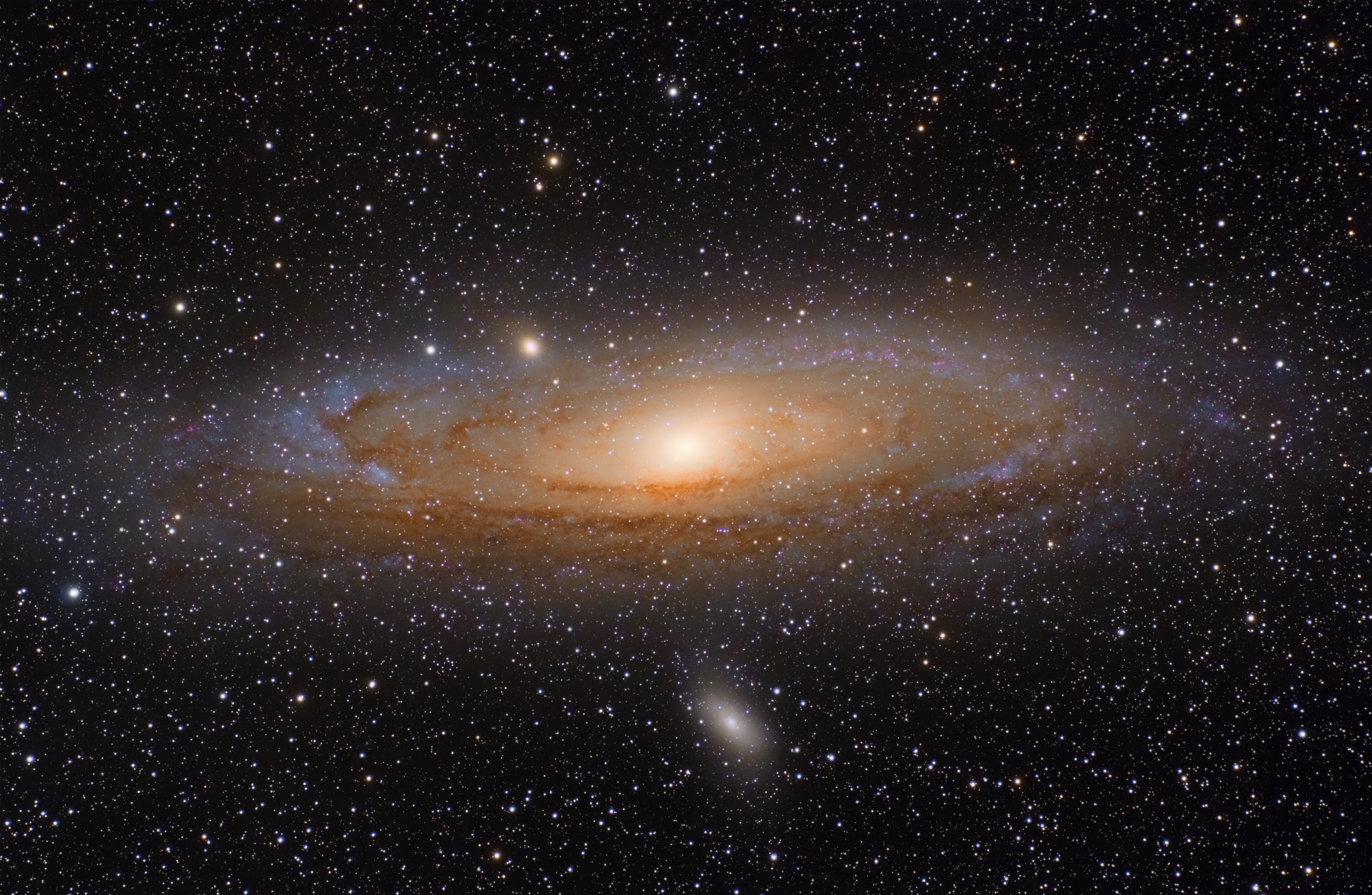
Enhanced image of the Andromeda Galaxy and its two satellite galaxies, Messier 32 above and Messier 110 below.

A mosaic of the galaxy, taken by Hubble

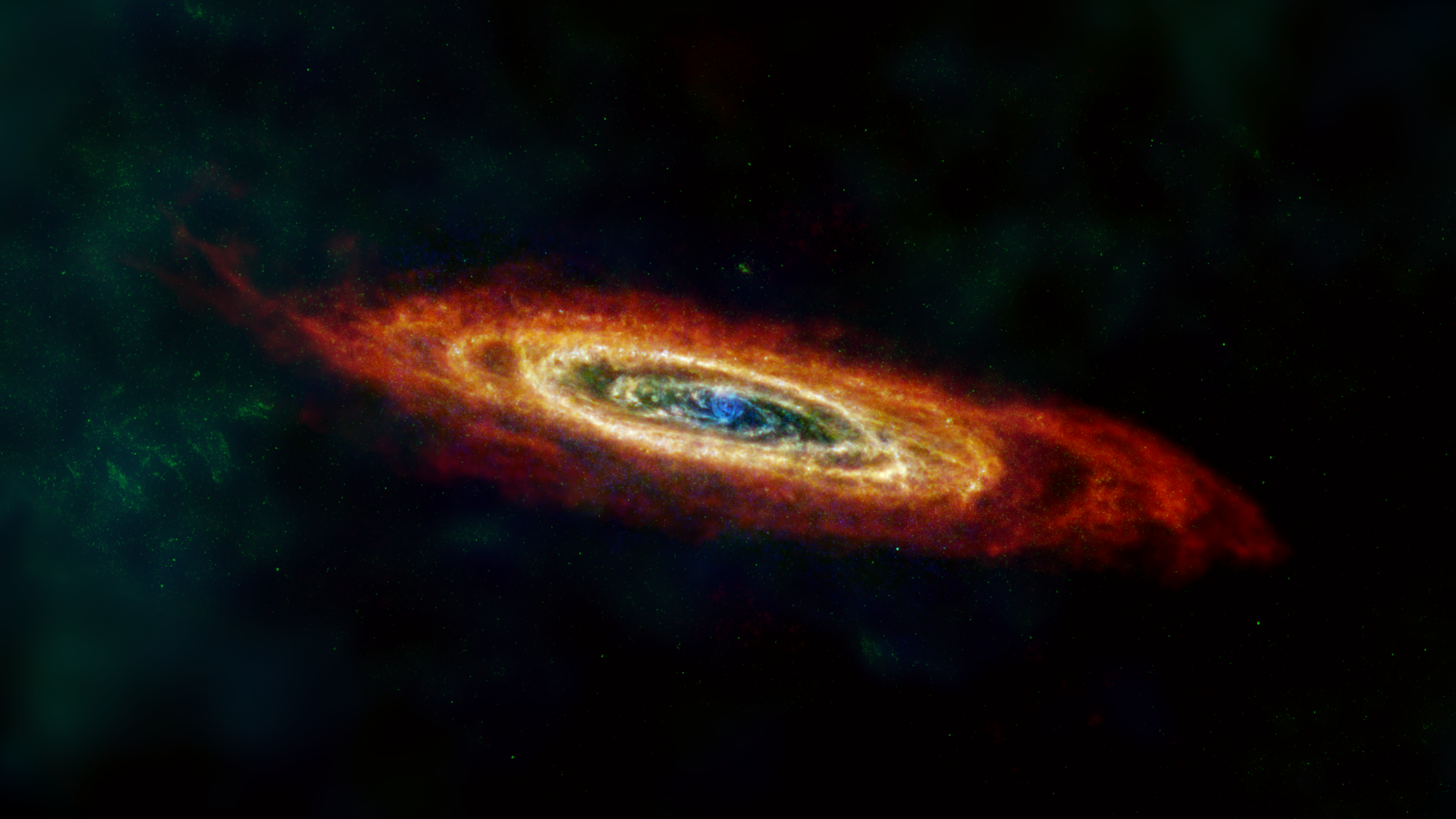
The galaxy (infrared-radio wavelengths)

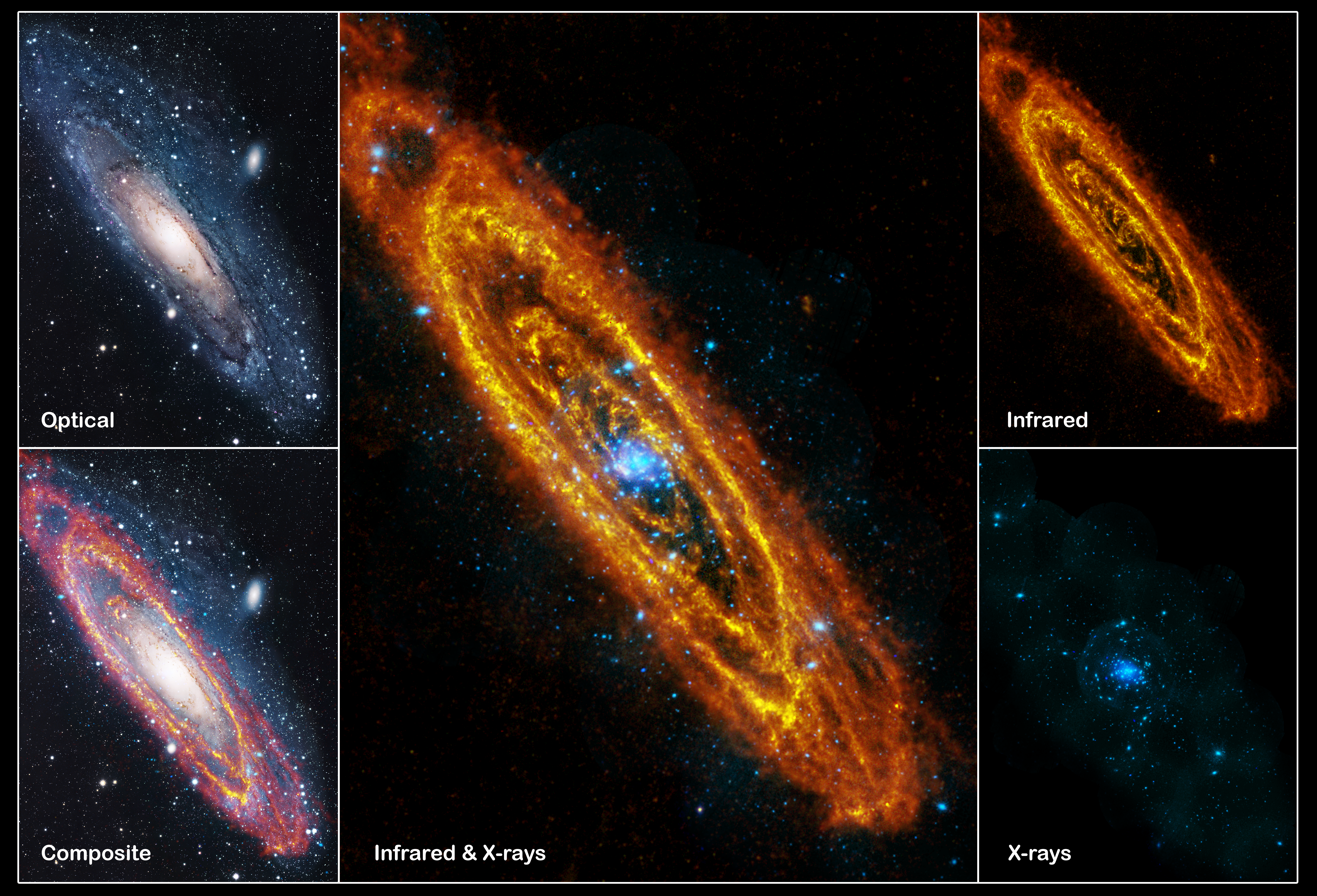
A multiwavelength image of the galaxy

== See also ==
- List of Messier objects
- List of galaxies
- New General Catalogue
