= EG Andromedae =

Binary star system in the constellation Andromeda

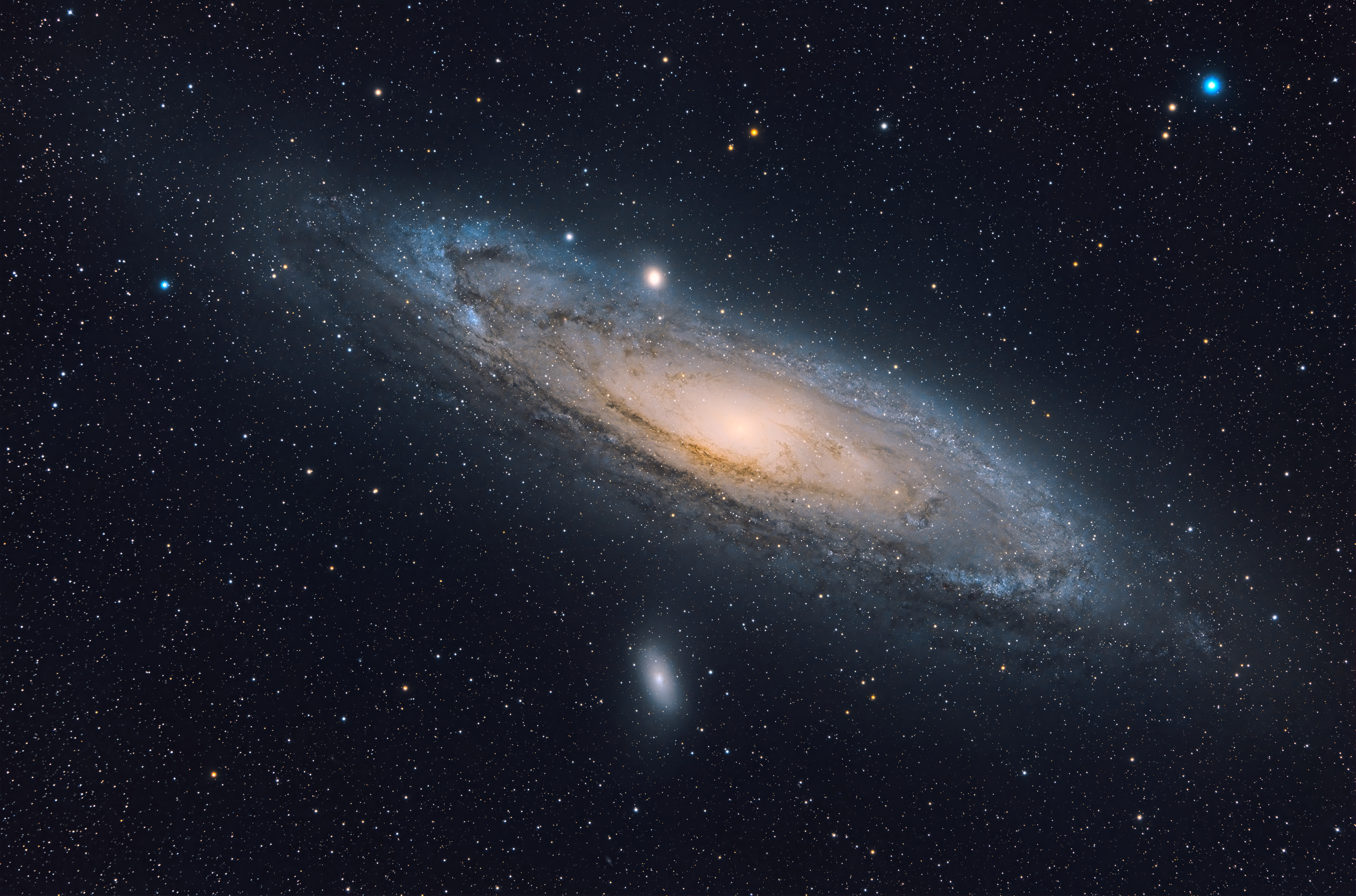
- View of the Andromeda Galaxy, with EG And circled in red. The star is much closer than Andromeda, within the Milky Way galaxy.

Observation data Epoch J2000 Equinox ICRS
- Constellation: Andromeda
- Right ascension: 00^{h} 44^{m} 37.18738^{s}
- Declination: +40° 40′ 45.7048″
- Apparent magnitude (V): 6.97 – 7.80 variable

Characteristics
- Spectral type: M2IIIep
- Apparent magnitude (U): 10.54
- Apparent magnitude (B): 8.93
- Apparent magnitude (V): 7.22
- Apparent magnitude (G): 6.29
- Apparent magnitude (J): 3.65
- Apparent magnitude (H): 2.79
- Apparent magnitude (K): 2.56
- U−B color index: 3.32
- B−V color index: 1.71
- Variable type: Symbiotic

Astrometry
Radial velocity (R_{v})	−94.80±0.30 km/s
Proper motion (μ)	RA: 8.614 mas/yr Dec.: −15.466 mas/yr
Parallax (π)	1.6452±0.0335 mas
Distance	1,305 ± 65 ly (400±20 pc)

Orbit
Period (P)	482.5±1.3 days
Semi-major axis (a)	307+16 −10 R_{☉}
Eccentricity (e)	0
Inclination (i)	60°
Semi-amplitude (K_{1}) (primary)	7.30±0.13 km/s

Details

White dwarf
Mass	0.38+0.04 −0.02 M_{☉}
Radius	0.019–0.023 R_{☉}
Luminosity	12.9-38.4 L_{☉}
Surface gravity (log g)	7.5 cgs
Temperature	80,000–95,000 K

Red giant
Mass	1.29+0.23 −0.13 M_{☉}
Radius	77±5 R_{☉}
Luminosity	920+160 −140 L_{☉}
Temperature	3,620+120 −110 K
Metallicity [Fe/H]	−0.05+0.28 −0.27 dex

Other designations
- 2MASS J00443718+4040456, BD+39 167, HD 4174, HIP 3494, SAO 36618, TYC 2801-1704-1

Database references
SIMBAD	data

EG Andromedae (often abbreviated to EG And) is a symbiotic binary in the constellation Andromeda. Its apparent visual magnitude varies between 6.97 and 7.80.

== System ==
The EG Andromedae system hosts a white dwarf and an evolved giant star, with an orbital period of 482.5 days. The giant star is losing mass through its stellar wind at a rate higher than 10^{−6} M_{☉}/yr, and the white dwarf is accreting a fraction of this mass without forming an accretion disk. The white dwarf itself could emit a hot wind that interacts with the cooler one of the giant star, in addition to inducing the photoionization of the latter. X-ray observations, however, failed to detect emission coming from colliding winds, but established the non-magnetic nature of the white dwarf and estimated its accretion rate at 1–10×10^{−7} M_{☉}/yr.

The giant star does not fill its Roche lobe but there are still large uncertainties on its mass and radius. Even the parameters of the white dwarf are not strictly constrained, but available models can give lower and upper limits.

== Spectrum ==
The optical spectral classification of EG Andromedae is M2IIIep, the one of a cool giant star with a peculiar spectrum and strong emission lines. The white dwarf contaminates the spectrum of the giant star photoionizes the stellar wind, giving rise to the spectral peculiarities. Emission lines H-alpha and H-beta, as well as TiO and Ca_{I} ones, change in phase with the orbit.

The white dwarf is best studied in the ultraviolet, where also highly ionized species sulfur, oxygen, nitrogen, carbon and phosphorus can be identified with their absorption or emission lines.

X-ray observation of EG Andromedae detected a hot plasma (at a temperature of 3 keV) that is likely situated in the outer boundary layer of the white dwarf, without any contribution from an accretion disk.

== Variability ==
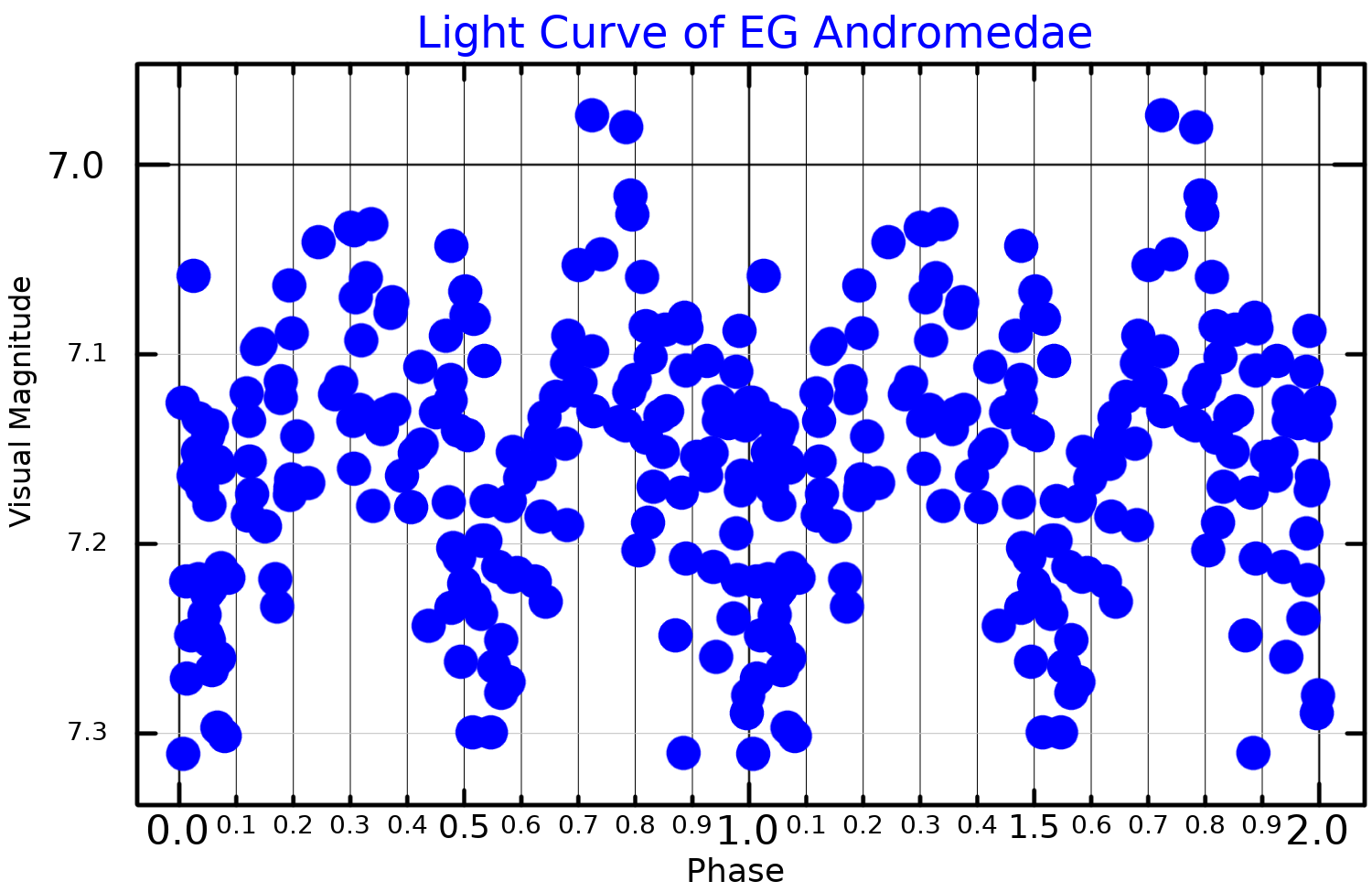
The visual band light curve of EG Andromedae, adapted from Skopal (2006)

Discovery of the photometric variability of EG Andromedae was announced in 1964 by Polish astronomer Tadeusz Jarzębowski, based on observations made from 1961 through 1963 at Wroclaw Observatory.

To date, no outburst has been observed in EG Andromedae. The observed variability is well described by the two components eclipsing each other during the orbit. However, there is some evidence that the giant star and the wind flow have an intrinsic variation.

== Bow shock of a ghost planetary nebula ==
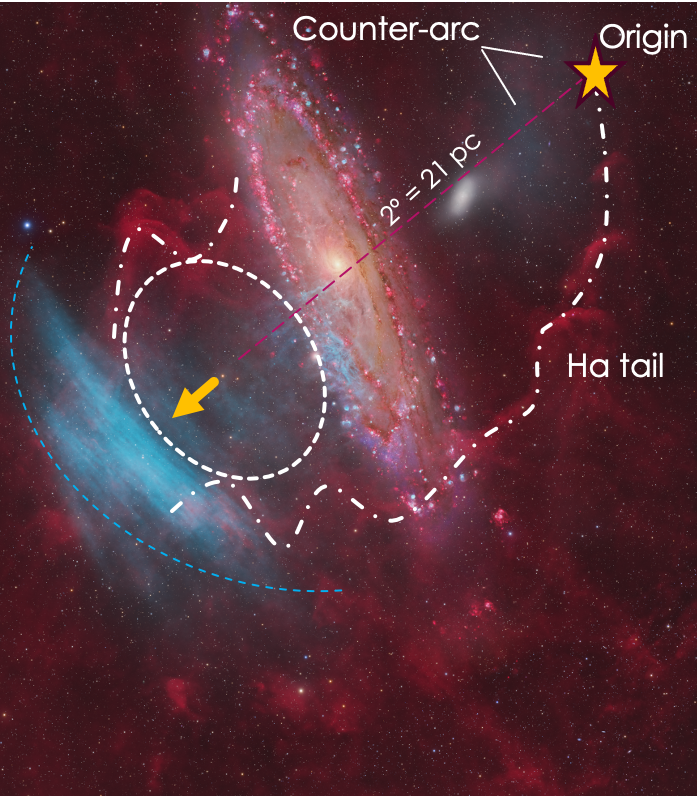
Sketch showing the direction of movement with an arrow. EG And is in the center of the ellipse, at the base of the arrow. The blue arc on the lower left is the bow shock SDSO1.

A giant nebula near the Andromeda galaxy (M31) was detected by amateur astronomers in doubly ionized oxygen and was cataloged as the Strottner–Drechsler–Sainty Object (SDSO1). Initially it was suspected to belong to M31, but other scenarios, such as supernova remnant, planetary nebula or stellar bow shock nebula were considered. A later study did however find that SDSO1 is located within the Milky Way and it was considered to be a interstellar gas filament. Another study found that EG Andromedae expelled a planetary nebula 400,000 years ago. This planetary nebula faded and is today a ghost planetary nebula (GPN) with a diameter of 20 parsec. EG And has a hypersonic speed of 107 km/s relative to the interstellar medium. Therefore the giant GPN formed the bow shock SDSO1 around it.

== Gallery ==
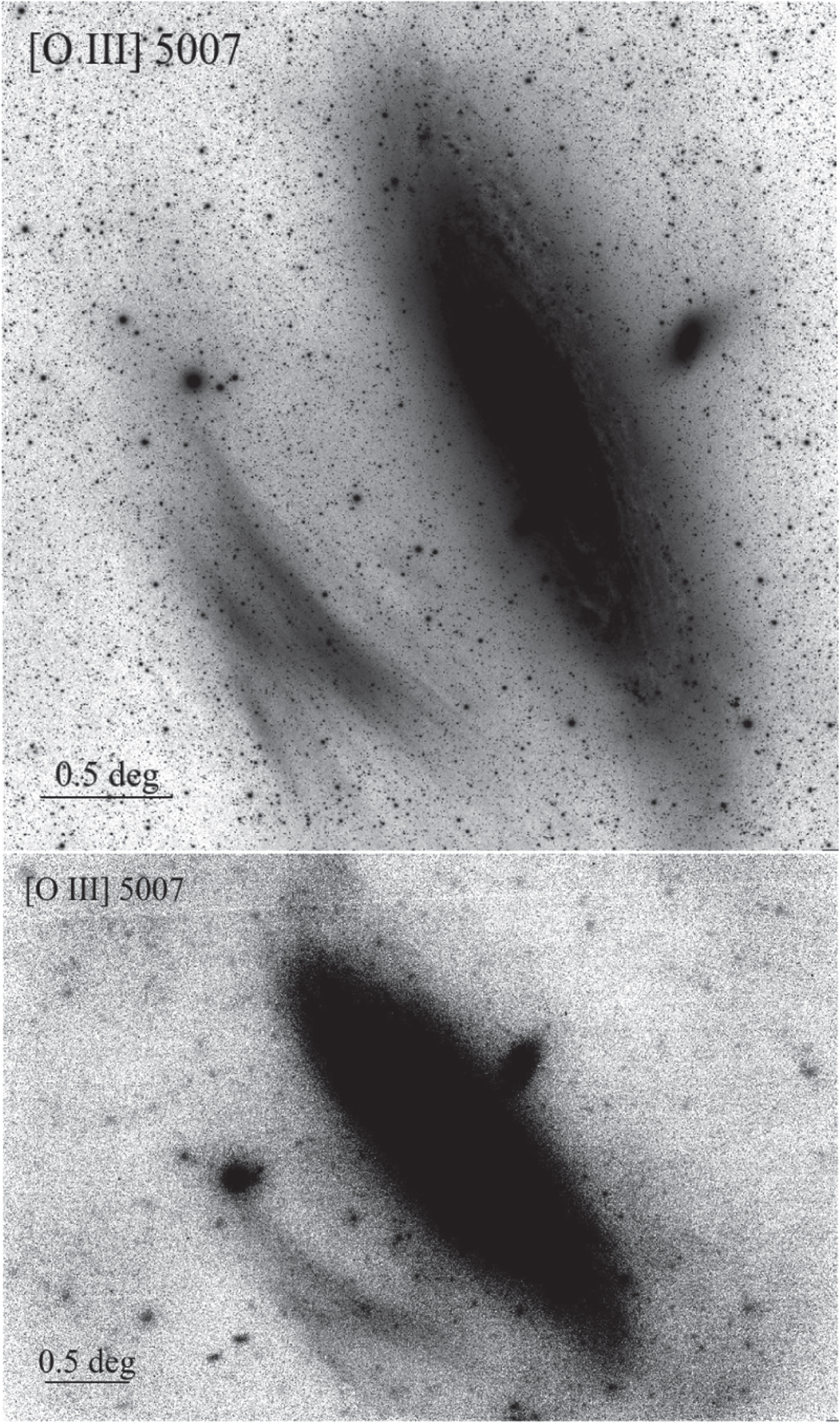
Discovery images of the giant oxygen nebula around M31

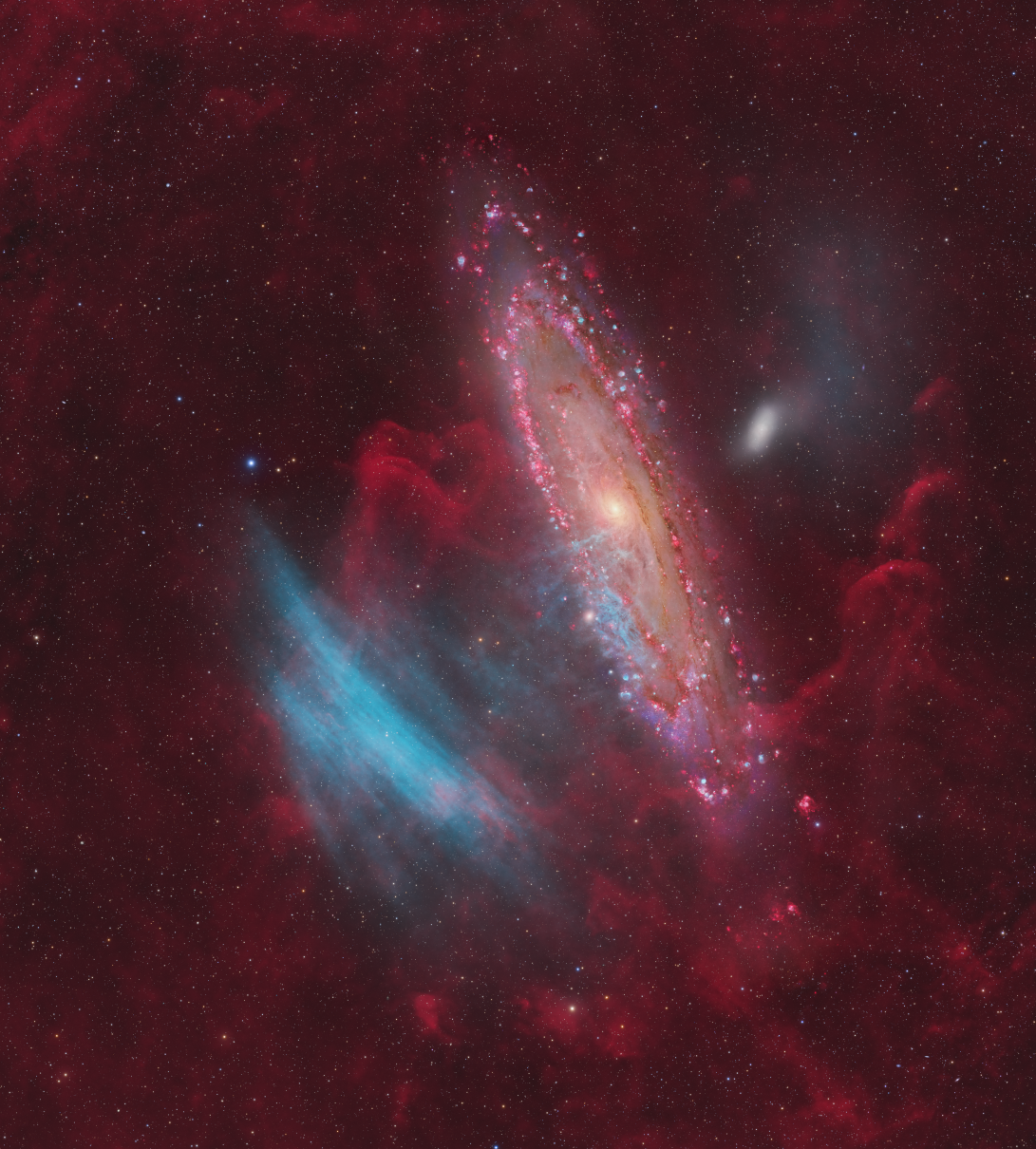
Wide-field image using H-alpha (red), oxygen [OIII] (blue) and a RGB combination.

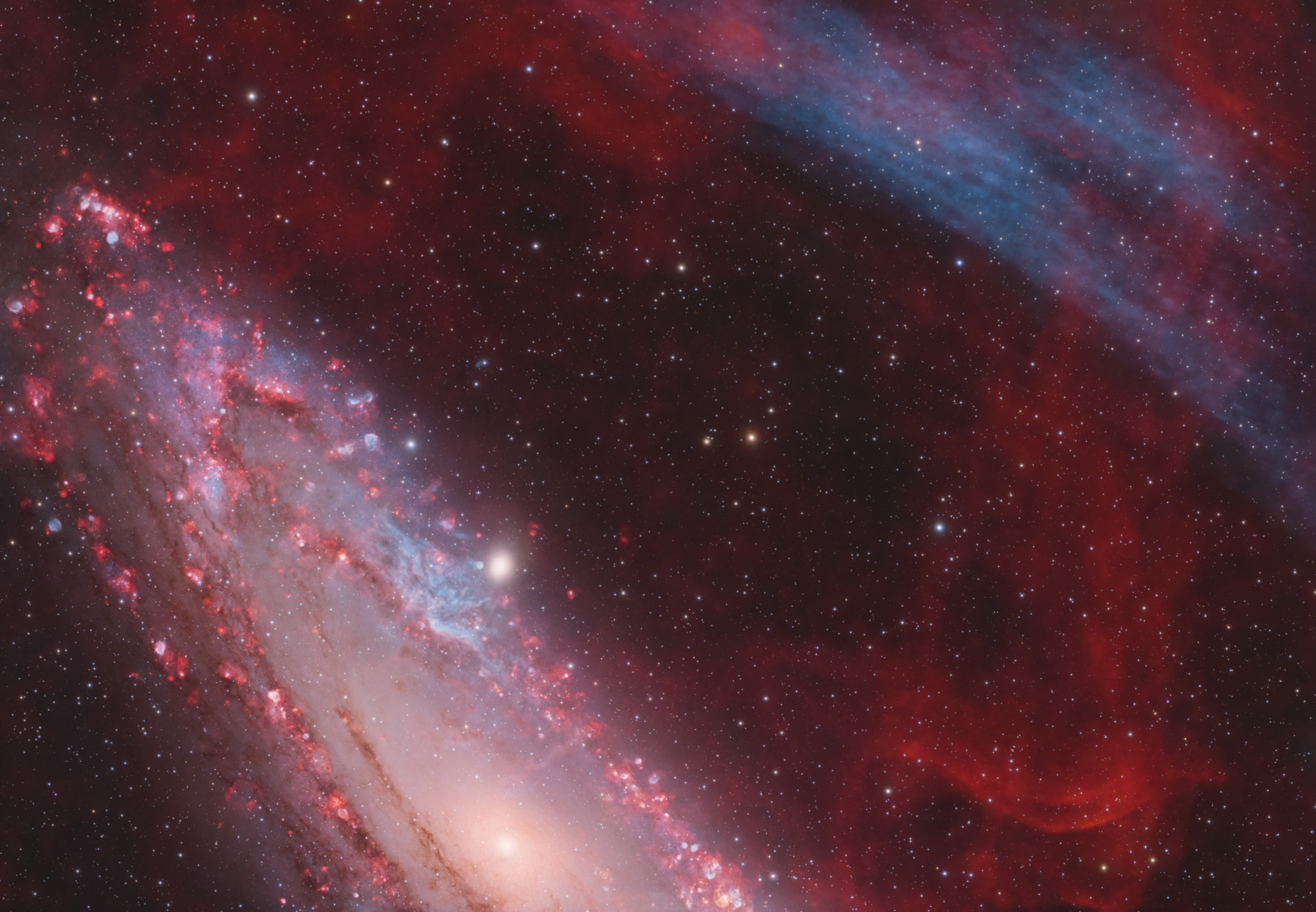
Detailed view of part of the nebula by the group "Deep Sky Collective"

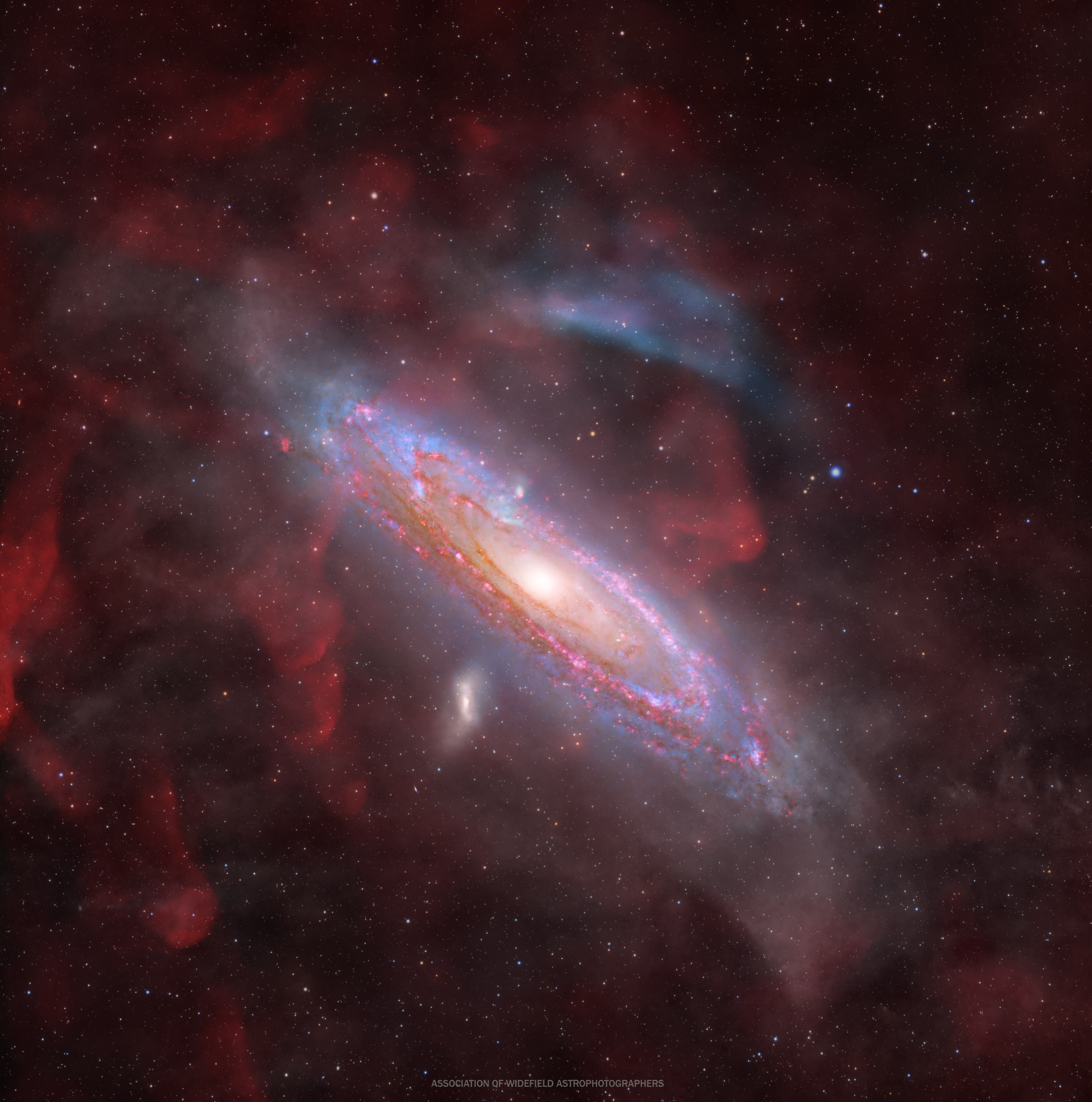
Image taken by the amateur astronomer group "Association of Widefield Astrophotographers"
