= 3XMM J004232.1+411314 =

Neutron star

Observation data Epoch J2000.0 Equinox ICRS
- Constellation: Andromeda
- Right ascension: 00^{h} 42^{m} 32.072^{s}
- Declination: +41° 13′ 14.33″

Characteristics
- Variable type: Low-mass X-ray binary

Orbit
Period (P)	4.15 hr
Semi-major axis (a)	0.6 light seconds
Inclination (i)	60–80°

Details

Neutron star
Mass	1.5 M_{☉}
Rotation	3s

Main-sequence star
Mass	0.2–0.3 M_{☉}

Database references
SIMBAD	data

3XMM J004232.1+411314 is a low-mass X-ray binary hosted in the galaxy M31. It is the most luminous source of hard X-rays in the Andromeda Galaxy. It is also the most luminous source known that shows dips in the X-ray light curve. The compact object in this system has been unambiguously identified as a neutron star with a spin period of 3 seconds.

== Identification of the source ==
The Swift BAT all-sky survey detected hard X-rays (in the energy range 14-195 keV) in the direction of M31 and found that this emission was centered in a region 6 arcseconds away from the galaxy center. Using a subsequent NuSTAR observation, it was found that a single source was responsible for this emission, and optical HST images ruled out the presence of stars more massive than 3 solar masses in that direction.

The same source was earlier observed in soft X-rays by XMM-Newton, and was given the catalogue name 3XMM J004232.1+411314. By analysing archival data elaborated by the EXTraS project, this source showed dips (a short and linear decrease in the source luminosity, which subsequently returns to the original luminosity level) in some observations. As this behaviour is typical of X-ray binaries, then this source can be identified as a low-mass X-ray binary.

== System properties ==
The orbit of this binary system has an inclination between 60° and 80° from our line of sight, since dips are observed only in this inclination range. The orbital period of the system is 4.01 hours, which is the same as the amount of time between two consecutive dips. Like many other low-mass X-ray binaries, the luminosity of this source varies over time. Using XMM-Newton observations of the Andromeda Galaxy, this source luminosity stays in the range 0.8–2.8×10^{38} erg/s in the 0.2-12 keV photon energy band. To date, this is the most luminous source that shows dips in its X-ray light curves.

The compact object of this system is a neutron star with a spin period of 3 seconds, and this is proved by the observation of a modulation with the same period in the X-ray luminosity.
