= Galaxy color–magnitude diagram =

Chart depicting the relationship between brightness and mass of large star systems

A mock-up of the galaxy color–magnitude diagram with three populations: the red sequence, the blue cloud, and the green valley.

The galaxy color–magnitude diagram shows the relationship between absolute magnitude (a measure of luminosity) and mass of galaxies. A preliminary description of the three areas of this diagram was made in 2003 by Eric F. Bell et al. from the COMBO-17 survey that clarified the bimodal distribution of red and blue galaxies as seen in the analysis of Sloan Digital Sky Survey data and even in de Vaucouleurs's 1961 analyses of galaxy morphology.

== Features ==
The diagram has three main features: the red sequence, the green valley, and the blue cloud. The red sequence includes most red galaxies, which are generally elliptical galaxies. The blue cloud includes most blue galaxies, which are generally spirals. In between the two distributions is an underpopulated space known as the green valley which includes a number of red spirals.

Like the comparable Hertzsprung–Russell diagram for stars, galaxy properties are not necessarily completely determined by their location on the color–magnitude diagram. The diagram also shows considerable evolution through time. The red sequence earlier in the evolution of the universe was more constant in color across magnitudes and the blue cloud was not as uniformly distributed but showed sequence progression.

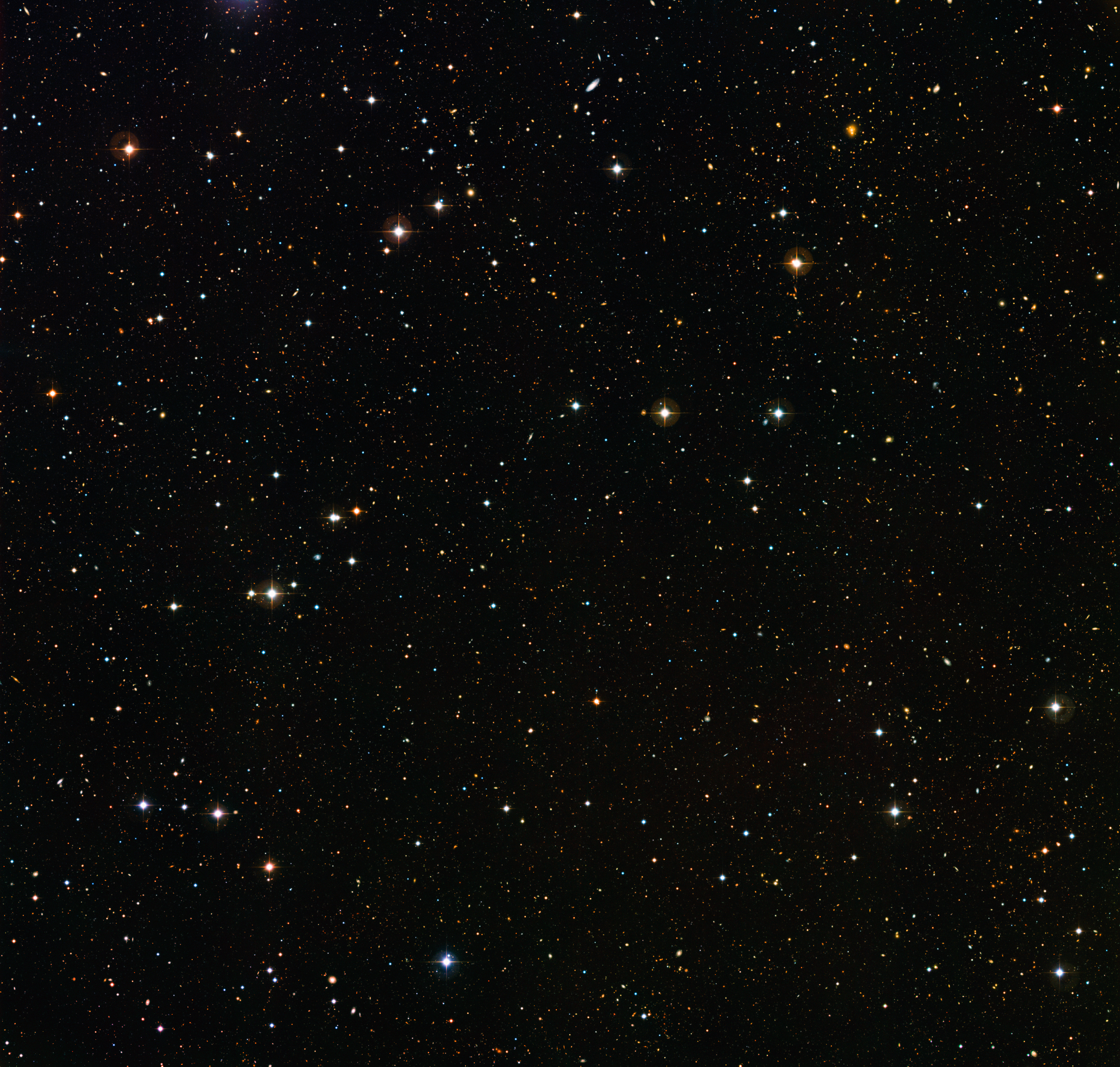
One of five patches of sky covered by the COMBO-17 survey.

New research suggests the green valley is actually composed of two different populations of galaxies: one of late-type galaxies, where star formation has been quenched due to their gas supplies being shut off followed by the exhaustion of their gas reservoirs for several billion years, and another of early-type galaxies where both the gas supplies and gas reservoirs have been destroyed very quickly, likely because of mergers with other galaxies and/or the presence of an active galactic nucleus.

Recent work has suggested that the traditional interpretation of the colour–magnitude diagram may be affected by the treatment of dust-rich lenticular (S0) galaxies.Inclination-dependent dust corrections can shift some massive lenticular galaxies away from the classical red sequence into a more populated intermediate region termed the "green mountain". In this interpretation, the red sequence itself contains multiple subpopulations, including dust-poor lenticular and elliptical galaxies, while dusty lenticular galaxies may define a distinct evolutionary pathway linked to gas-rich mergers and ongoing low-level star formation.

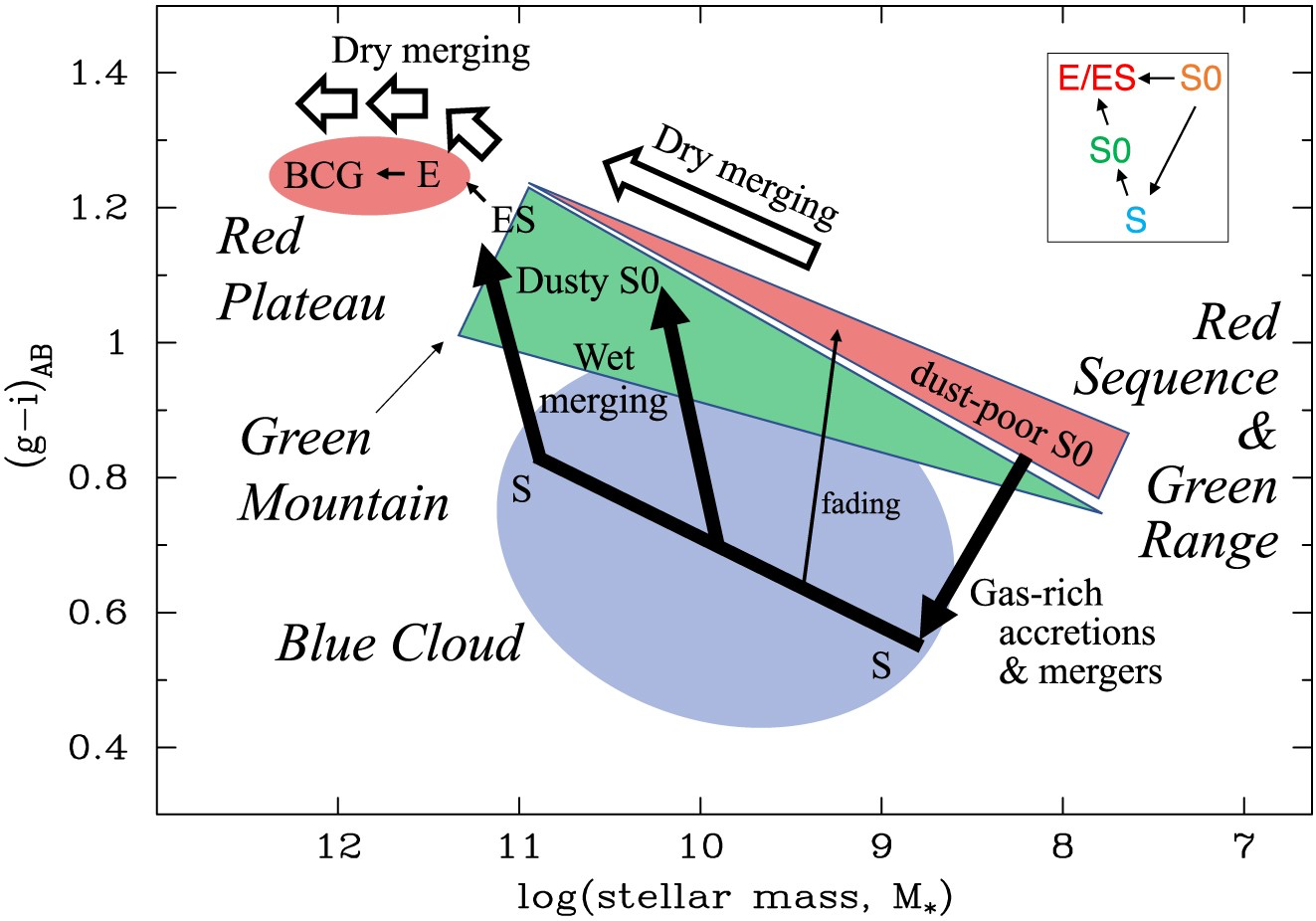
Schematic interpretation of galaxy populations in the galaxy colour–mass diagram, illustrating the red sequence, blue cloud, green valley, and the proposed green mountain population associated with dust-rich lenticular galaxies.

The Milky Way and the Andromeda Galaxy are assumed to lie in the green valley due to their star formation slowing down as a result of both running out of gas.

== See also ==
- Galaxy Zoo – Crowdsourced astronomy project, citizen science projects from 2007 to classify galaxy images
- Hertzsprung–Russell diagram – Scatter plot of stars showing the relationship of luminosity to stellar classification, used for stars in clusters
