= Gaia Sausage =

Remains of a galaxy merger in the Milky Way

Gaia Enceladus / also known as Gaia Sausage
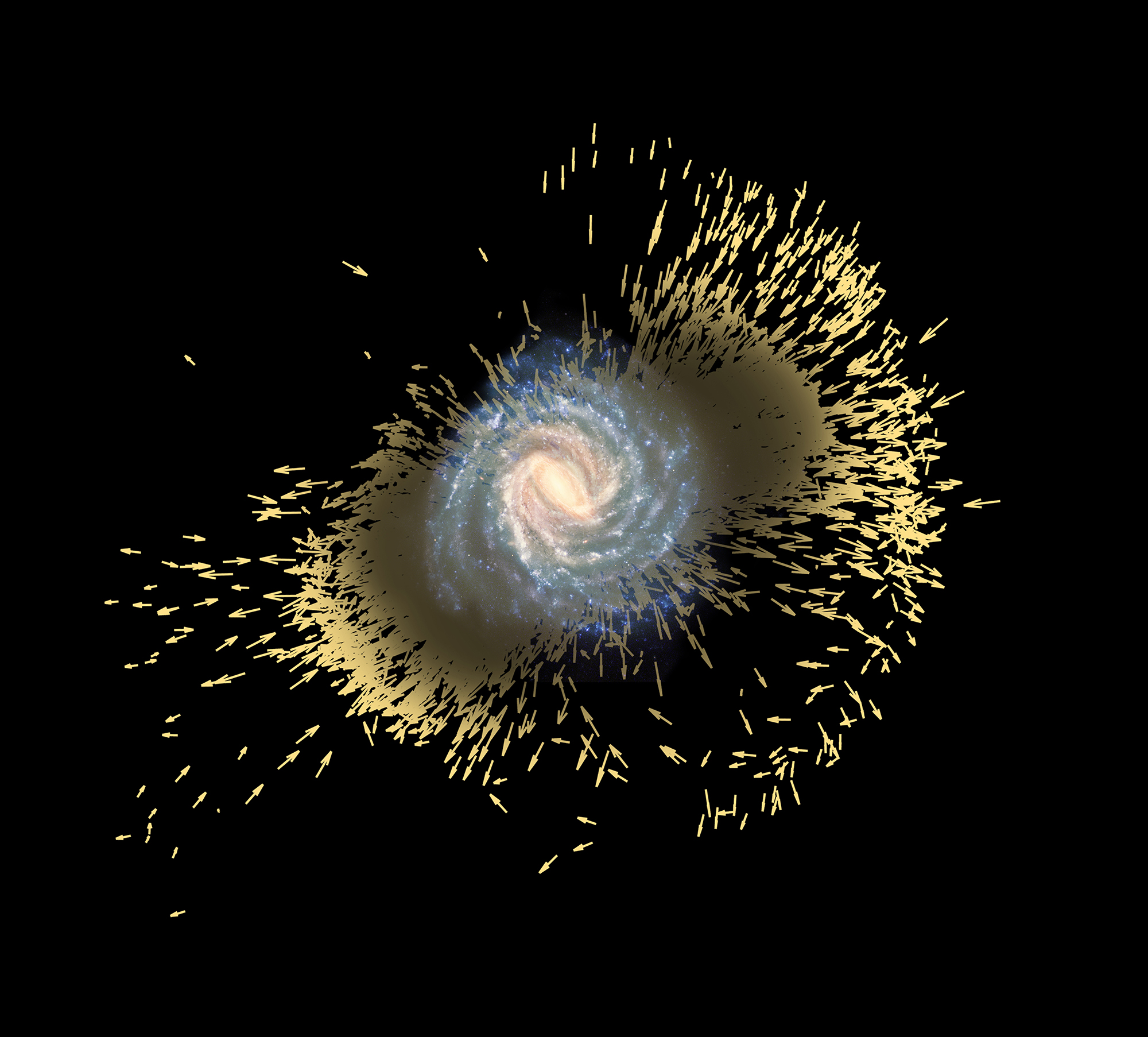
- Artist’s impression of debris from the Gaia-Enceladus galaxy. Yellow arrows represent the positions and velocities of stars originating from the dwarf galaxy, the data taken from a simulated merger with the Milky Way with similar properties to the one believed to have occurred. Credits: ESA (artist’s impression and composition); Koppelman, Villalobos and Helmi (simulation).

Observation data
- Constellation: multiple
- Group or cluster: Local Group

Characteristics
- Type: Dwarf galaxy
- Mass: 5×10^{10} M_{☉}

Other designations
- Gaia Enceladus; Enceladus Galaxy

The Gaia Sausage or Gaia Enceladus is the remains of a dwarf galaxy (known as the Gaia-Enceladus galaxy, Sausage Galaxy, Gaia-Enceladus-Sausage, or Gaia-Sausage-Enceladus) that merged with the Milky Way about 8–11 billion years ago. At least eight globular clusters were added to the Milky Way along with 50 billion solar masses of stars, gas and dark matter. It represents the last major merger of the Milky Way.

== Etymology ==
The "Gaia Sausage" is so-called because of the characteristic sausage shape of the population in a chart of velocity space, in particular a plot of radial ($\boldsymbol{v}_r$) versus azimuthal velocity ($\boldsymbol{v}_\theta$) of stars (see Spherical coordinate system), using data from the Gaia Mission. The stars that have merged with the Milky Way have orbits that are highly elongated. The outermost points of their orbits are around 20 kiloparsecs from the Galactic Center at what is called the "halo break". These stars had previously been seen in Hipparcos data and identified as originаting from an accreted galaxy.

The name "Enceladus" refers to the mythological giant Enceladus, who was buried under Mount Etna and caused earthquakes. Similarly, this former galaxy was buried in the Milky Way, and caused the puffing up of the thick disc.

== Components ==
=== Globular clusters ===
The globular clusters firmly identified as former Sausage members are Messier 2, Messier 56, Messier 75, Messier 79, NGC 1851, NGC 2298, and NGC 5286.

=== The nature of NGC 2808 ===
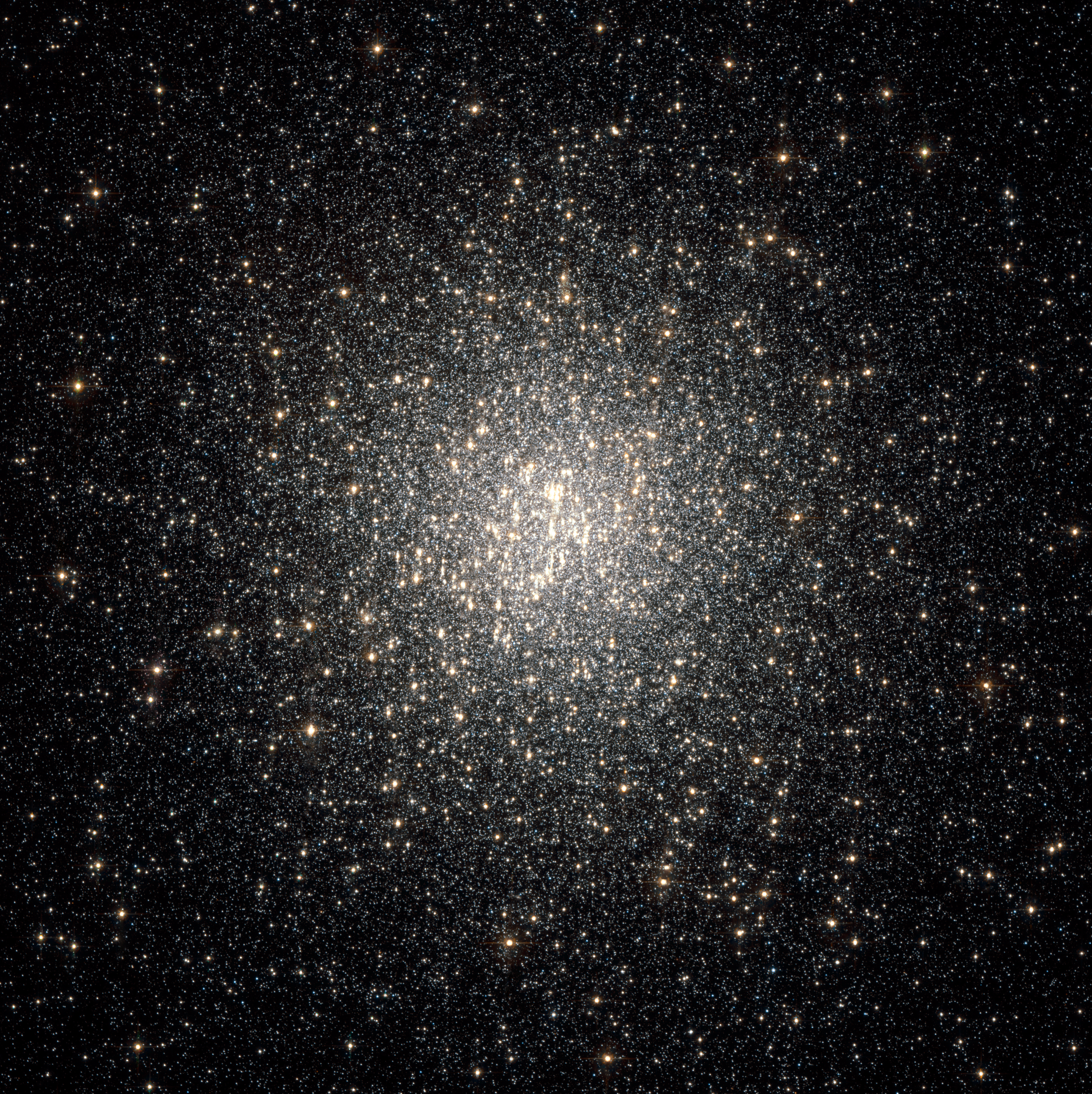
NGC 2808, possible old core of Gaia Sausage

NGC 2808 is another globular-like cluster of the Sausage. It is composed of three generations of stars, all born within 200 million years of the formation of the cluster.

One theory to account for three generations of stars is that NGC 2808 is the former core of the Sausage. This could also account for its stellar population of over a million stars, which is unusually large for a globular cluster.

=== Stars ===
The stars from this dwarf orbit the Milky Way core with extreme eccentricities on the order of about 0.9. Their metallicity is also typically higher than other halo stars, with most having [Fe/H] > −1.7 dex, i.e., at least 2% of the solar value.

The "Gaia Sausage" reconstructed the Milky Way by puffing up the thin disk to make it a thick disk, whilst the gas it brought into the Milky Way triggered a fresh round of star formation and replenished the thin disk. The debris from the dwarf galaxy provides most of the metal-rich part of the galactic halo.

The brown dwarf and subdwarf CWISE J155349.96+693355.2 with a spectral type sdT4 was first identified as a possible member of the Helmi stream due to an uncertain radial velocity. This discovery was made by the backyard worlds project. Later follow-up spectroscopy with JWST resulted in a different radial velocity of −163±5 km/s. Combined with the proper motion, this results in a highly eccentric orbit (e≥0.9). The low metallicity, kinematics and modest alpha enrichment are equivalent to stars identified in the Gaia-Enceladus structure. This makes WISE J1553+6933 the first brown dwarf member of Gaia-Enceladus.

== See also ==
- Field of Streams
- Monoceros Ring
- Omega Centauri
- M32p, large galaxy merged into Andromeda Galaxy, responsible for its thick disc and most halo stars
- J1124+4535
- FSR 1758, globular cluster likely from a dwarf galaxy which merged into the Milky Way
- Kraken galaxy, another proposed large galaxy merged into Milky Way but earlier, contributed at least some of the surviving 150 globular clusters to the Milky Way.
