= List of stellar streams =

Overview of elongated streams of stars

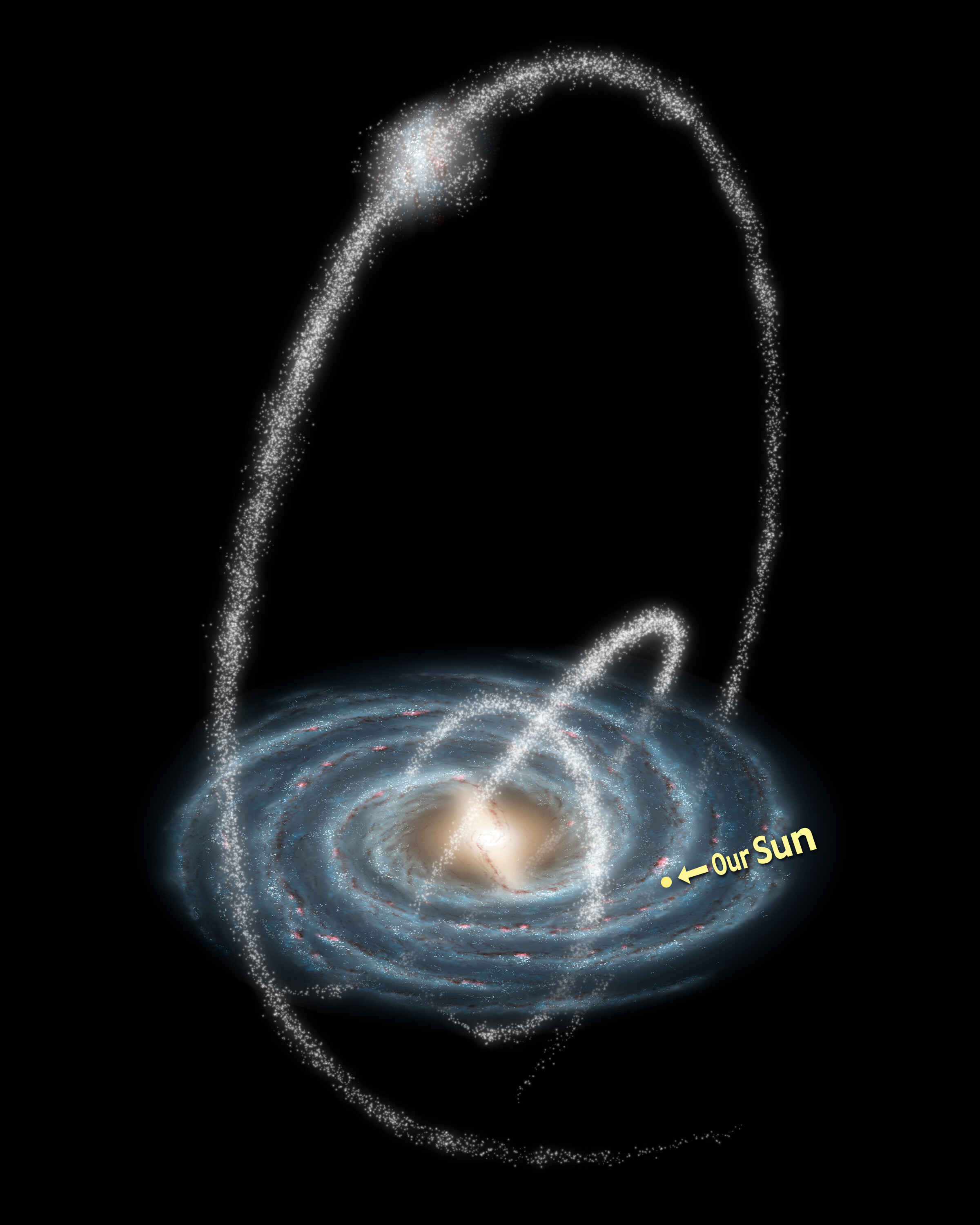
Stellar streams in the Milky Way, discovered in 2007

This is a list of stellar streams. A stellar stream is an association of stars orbiting a galaxy taking the appearance of an elongated stream of stars. Stars that are part of stellar streams were often once part of a globular cluster or dwarf galaxy. However, their original system has now been torn apart and stretched out along its orbit by the tidal forces of the larger galaxy. An exception in the list about Milky Way streams given below is the Magellanic Stream, composed of gas (mostly hydrogen), although in 2023, a population of stars has been described inside it.

== Local Group streams ==
=== Milky Way streams ===
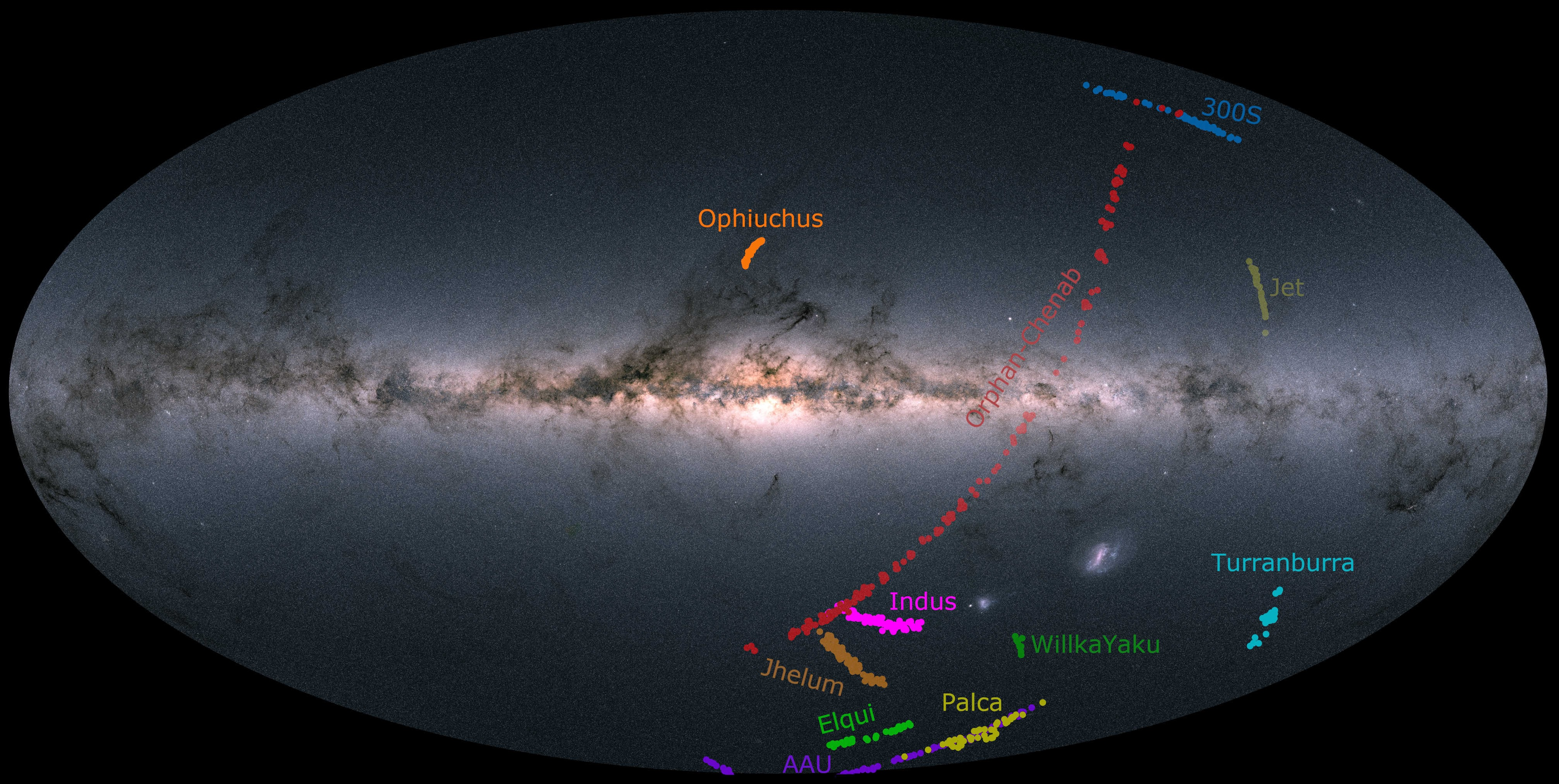
Recent stellar streams on the Milky Way studied by the Southern Stellar Stream Spectroscopic Survey (S⁵ collaboration) using the Anglo-Australian Telescope (2022)

Known streams in the Milky Way
Name	Origin	Mass (solar masses)	Length (light-years)	Composition	Discovery year
Arcturus stream	Defunct dwarf galaxy	Unknown	Unknown	Old stars deficient in heavy elements	1971
Magellanic Stream	Large and Small Magellanic Clouds	200 million	1 million	Hydrogen gas	1972
Sagittarius Stream	Sagittarius Dwarf Spheroidal Galaxy	100 million	1 million	Wide variety of stars	1994
Helmi stream	Defunct dwarf galaxy	10—100 million	Several complete loops around the Milky Way	Old stars deficient in heavy elements	1999
Palomar 5 stream (Serpens Stream)	Globular cluster Palomar 5	5,000	30,000	Old stars	2001
Virgo Stream	Defunct dwarf galaxy		30,000		2001
Monoceros Ring	Canis Major Overdensity	100 million	200,000	Intermediate age stars	2002
Anticenter stream	Defunct dwarf galaxy	Unknown	30,000	Old stars	2006
GD-1	Globular cluster			Metal-poor stars	2006
NGC 5466 stream 45 Degree tidal stream	Globular cluster NGC 5466	10,000	60,000	Very old stars	2006
Orphan stream	Unknown source (hence its name)	Unknown	20,000	Old stars	2006
Acheron stream	Globular cluster				2007
Boötes III stream	Embedded in, and possible progenitor of the Styx stream				2007
Cocytus stream	Globular cluster				2007
Lethe stream	Globular cluster	10,000	18,000	Old, metal-poor stars	2007
Styx stream	Defunct dwarf galaxy (possibly Boötes III)				2007
Cetus Polar Stream	Defunct dwarf galaxy	Unknown	Unknown	Old stars	2009
Aquarius Stream	Defunct dwarf galaxy	Unknown	30,000	Old stars	2010
Lamost 1	Disrupted globular cluster	21,000		Intermediate-age stars	2015
Phoenix Stream	Disrupted globular cluster	Unknown	8,000	Very old stars	2016
S1 Stream	disrupted dwarf galaxy	94			2017
Fimbulthul stream	Globular cluster Omega Centauri	318			2019
Pisces-Eridanus stream	disrupted cluster or association	2,000	1,300	very young (~120 Myr) nearby (260 - 870 light-years) stream	2019
Nyx stream	remnant of a disrupted dwarf galaxy — long-ago galaxy merger			about 200 stars	2020
Specter stream	disrupted ultra-faint dwarf galaxy	2,000	18,000		2022

=== Andromeda Galaxy streams ===
Known streams in the Andromeda Galaxy
Name	Origin	Mass (solar masses)	Length (light-years)	Composition	Discovery year
M31 Giant stellar stream					
Andromeda NE stellar stream					2004
Tidal Stream Northwest (Tidal Stream E and F)	disrupted dwarf galaxies				2009
Tidal Stream Southwest					2009
East Cloud					
North Spur					
Stream A					
Stream B					
Stream C					
Stream D					

== Streams beyond the Local Group ==
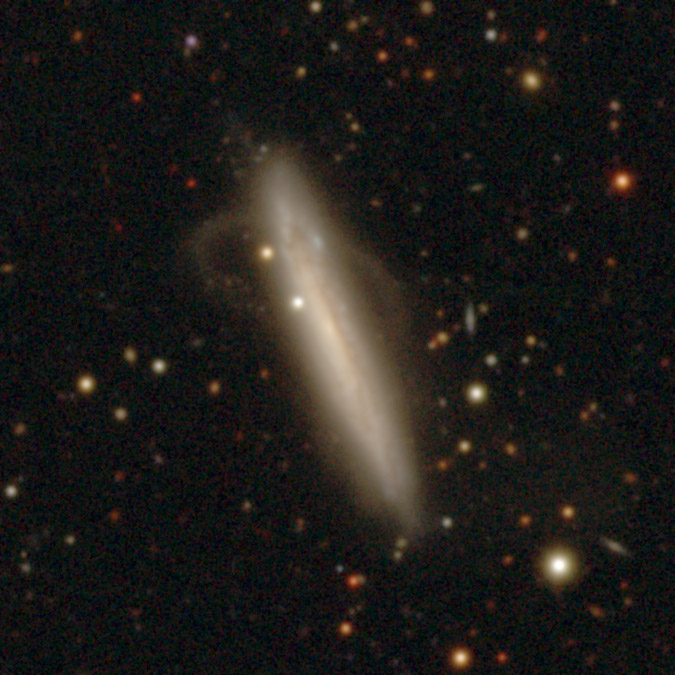
NGC 5387 with its stellar stream

Due to new deeper sky surveys, such as the DESI Legacy Imaging Survey, a large number of streams are to be expected to be discovered in the future. An initial search in 2023 by Martínez-Delgado et al. searched 389 galaxies and found 89 candidates with stellar streams (22,9%). They plan to search about 3100 galaxies, which might yield hundreds of candidates. In the pasts less sensitive surveys such as SDSS were only able to detect the brightest stellar streams.

Other known streams outside the Local Group
Name	Location	Origin	Mass (solar masses)	Length (light-years)	Composition	Characteristics	Discovery year
Young Blue Tidal Stream	NGC 5128	A gas fragment or a dwarf galaxy					2002
stream 947-4966	NGC 4013	former dwarf satellite with low inclination orbit				large looping structure	2008
9477-J0949.4-STO 749988 (SMS J 4977449 tI947)	NGC 5907	low-mass satellite accretion				multiple surrounding loops	2009
	NGC 4651	satellite accretion				narrow jet-like structure and surrounding debris shell	2010
	NGC 3521	satellite accretion				jet-like structure and surrounding debris shell	2010
	NGC 7531	satellite accretion				surrounding debris shell	2010
	NGC 1084	satellite accretion				three giant disconnected plumes of similar width	2010
	NGC 4216	satellite accretion				ongoing tidal disruption of satellite galaxies seen as long tails extending from the progenitor satellite	2010
	NGC 1055	satellite accretion				clear box shaped inner halo sprinkled with a plethora of coherent spikes	2010
	NGC 5291	galaxy interaction				two separate tidal tails to the north and south	?
petal of the sunflower	Messier 63 (NGC 5055)	dwarf satellite accretion	4 × 10^{8}				1979/2011
	NGC 5387	satellite accretion	6 × 10^{8}	11.7 kpc	young stars	enhanced star formation, metal-poor	2014
feather on the hat	Messier 104 (NGC 4594)	major merger				extremely metal rich	2021
	NGC 4303	leftovers of a dwarf galaxy that was torn apart by M61's gravity	2 × 10^{8}	50 kpc		first stellar stream discovered with the Vera C. Rubin Observatory	2025

== See also ==
- Lists of astronomical objects
- List of nearby stellar associations and moving groups
- Field of Streams
- Stellar kinematics
- Galaxy merger
- Local Bubble
- Satellite galaxies of the Milky Way
