= M79 =

M79 or M-79 may refer to:

- M79 (New York City bus), a New York City Bus route in Manhattan
- Messier 79, a globular cluster in the constellation Lepus
- M79 grenade launcher, an American grenade launcher
- M79 rocket launcher, a Yugoslav rocket launcher
- M-79 (Michigan highway), a state highway in Michigan
- Calder Freeway in Victoria, Australia, designated "M79"
- "M79" (song), a song by Vampire Weekend from their self-titled album
