= C73 =

C73 or C-73 may refer to:

- Boeing C-73, a 1933 military aircraft
- C-73 (Michigan county highway)
- Ruy Lopez chess openings ECO code
- Thyroid cancer ICD-10 code
- Caldwell 73 (NGC 1851), a globular cluster in the constellation Columba
