= NGC 2808 =

Globular cluster in the constellation Carina

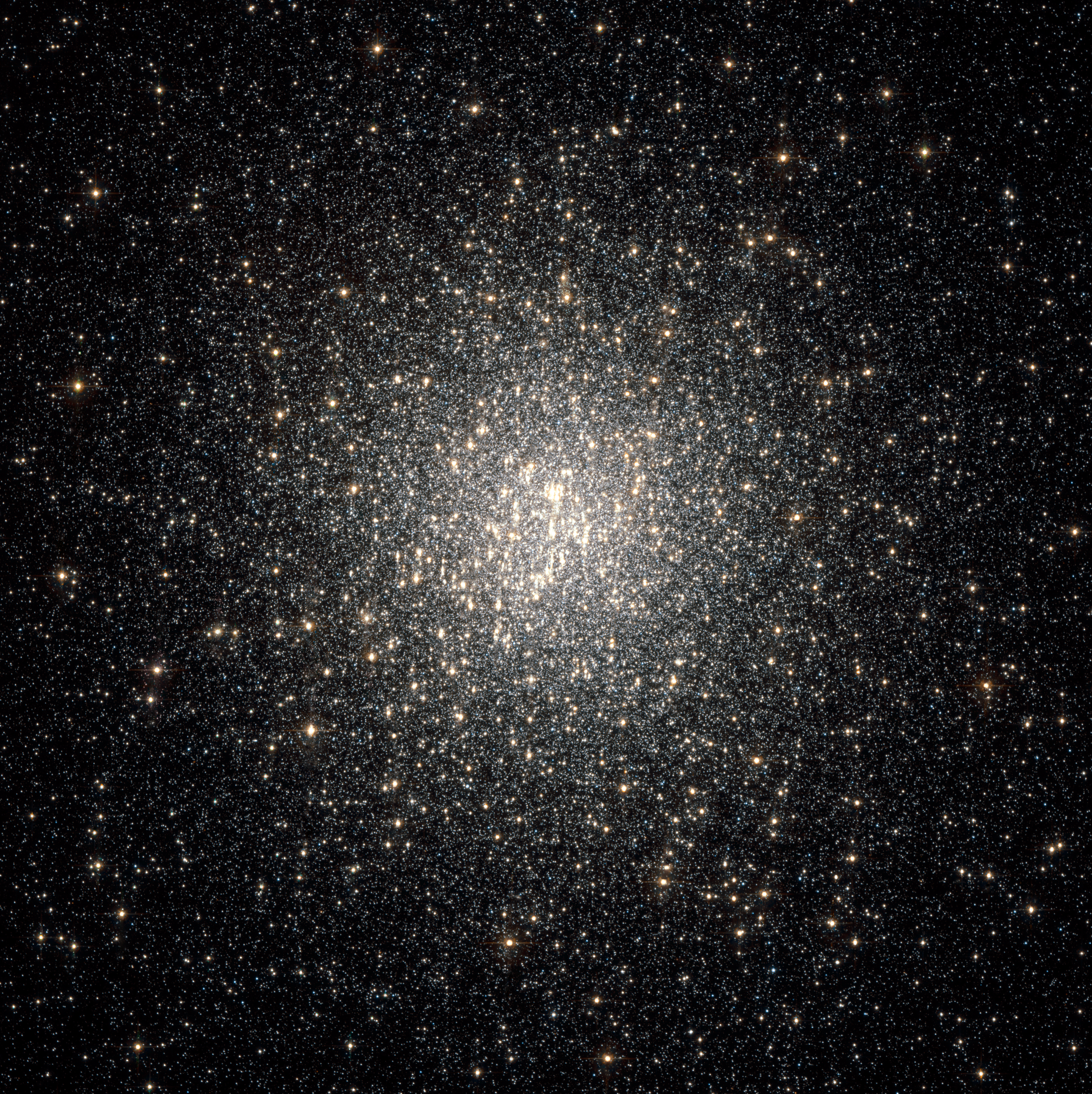
- A Hubble Space Telescope (HST) image of NGC 2808

Observation data (J2000 epoch)
- Class: I
- Constellation: Carina
- Right ascension: 09^{h} 12^{m} 03.10^{s}
- Declination: –64° 51′ 48.6″
- Distance: 31.3 kly (9.6 kpc)
- Apparent magnitude (V): 6.2
- Apparent dimensions (V): 14.2′

Physical characteristics
- Mass: 1.42×10^{6} M_{☉}
- Metallicity: [Fe/H] = –1.14 dex
- Estimated age: 10.2 Gyr
- Other designations: GCl 13, Melotte 95

NGC 2808 is a globular cluster of stars in the southern constellation of Carina. The cluster currently belongs to the Milky Way, although it was likely stolen from a dwarf galaxy that collided with the Milky Way. NGC 2808 is one of the Milky Way's most massive clusters, containing more than a million stars. It is estimated to be 12.5 billion years old.

The cluster is being disrupted by the galactic tide, trailing a long tidal tail.

== Star generations ==
It had been thought that NGC 2808, like typical globular clusters, contains only one generation of stars formed simultaneously from the same material. In 2007, a team of astronomers led by Giampaolo Piotto of the University of Padua in Italy investigated Hubble Space Telescope images of NGC 2808 taken in 2005 and 2006 with Hubble's Advanced Camera for Surveys. Unexpectedly, they found that this cluster is composed of three generations of stars, all born within 200 million years of the formation of the cluster.

Astronomers have argued that globular clusters can produce only one generation of stars, because the radiation from first generation stars would drive the residual gas not consumed in the first star generation phase out of the cluster. However, the great mass of a cluster such as NGC 2808 may suffice to gravitationally counteract the loss of gaseous matter. Thus, a second and a third generation of stars may form.

An alternative explanation for the three star generations of NGC 2808 is that it may actually be the remnant core of a dwarf galaxy that collided with the Milky Way, called the Sausage Galaxy.

== See also ==
- Messier 54 and Messier 79, two other possibly extragalactic globular clusters
- Omega Centauri
