= Aquarius Stream =

Stellar stream in the Milky Way Galaxy

The Aquarius Stream is a stellar stream located in the Milky Way Galaxy. Most of the stars in the stream lie in the direction of the constellation Aquarius. At its nearest point, it is about 2,000 light years from Earth; at its furthest, it is about 30,000 light years away. It is the closest stellar stream to Earth yet found, and the youngest, having formed about 700 million years ago. It enters the solar neighborhood, and passes through the galactic disc before extending into the stellar halo on the other side. The stream was discovered in late 2010 by a team of astronomers involved in the RAdial Velocity Experiment (RAVE) survey led by New Zealander Mary Williams.

== Disputed origin ==
Studies of the Aquarius Stream disagree on its origin. In 2011, Williams and team found that their observations matched simulations for a stream that originated as a small galaxy. A spectroscopic followup on six Aquarius stars by Wylie-de Boer et al. (2012) theorized that it is actually a remnant of a disrupted globular cluster, citing similarities between their measurements of amounts of sodium and nickel in the Aquarius sample and those typical of Galactic globular clusters.

Casey et al. (2014), a direct response to the result of Wylie-de Boer et al. (2012), stated that the progenitor of the stream could not have been a globular cluster or dwarf galaxy. They proposed instead that not only did the stream originate in the Milky Way Galaxy, but it could have been created by a disruption to the disc of the Galaxy. On the basis of their metallicity analysis, they did not find evidence to support a globular cluster or dwarf galaxy origin for the stream.

== Connection to Omega Centauri ==
Spectral analysis of stars in the Aquarius stream led to the discovery of C222531-14543, a star with an unusual abundance pattern that does not match other stars in the stream. Casey et al. (2014) note the star's unique chemical makeup, and simulations of tidal debris from Omega Centauri, as evidence to suggest that the Aquarius Stream may be the result of an interaction between Omega Centauri and the Galactic disk.

== See also ==
- List of stellar streams
