= Virgo Stellar Stream =

Stellar stream in the constellatiion Virgo discovered in 2005

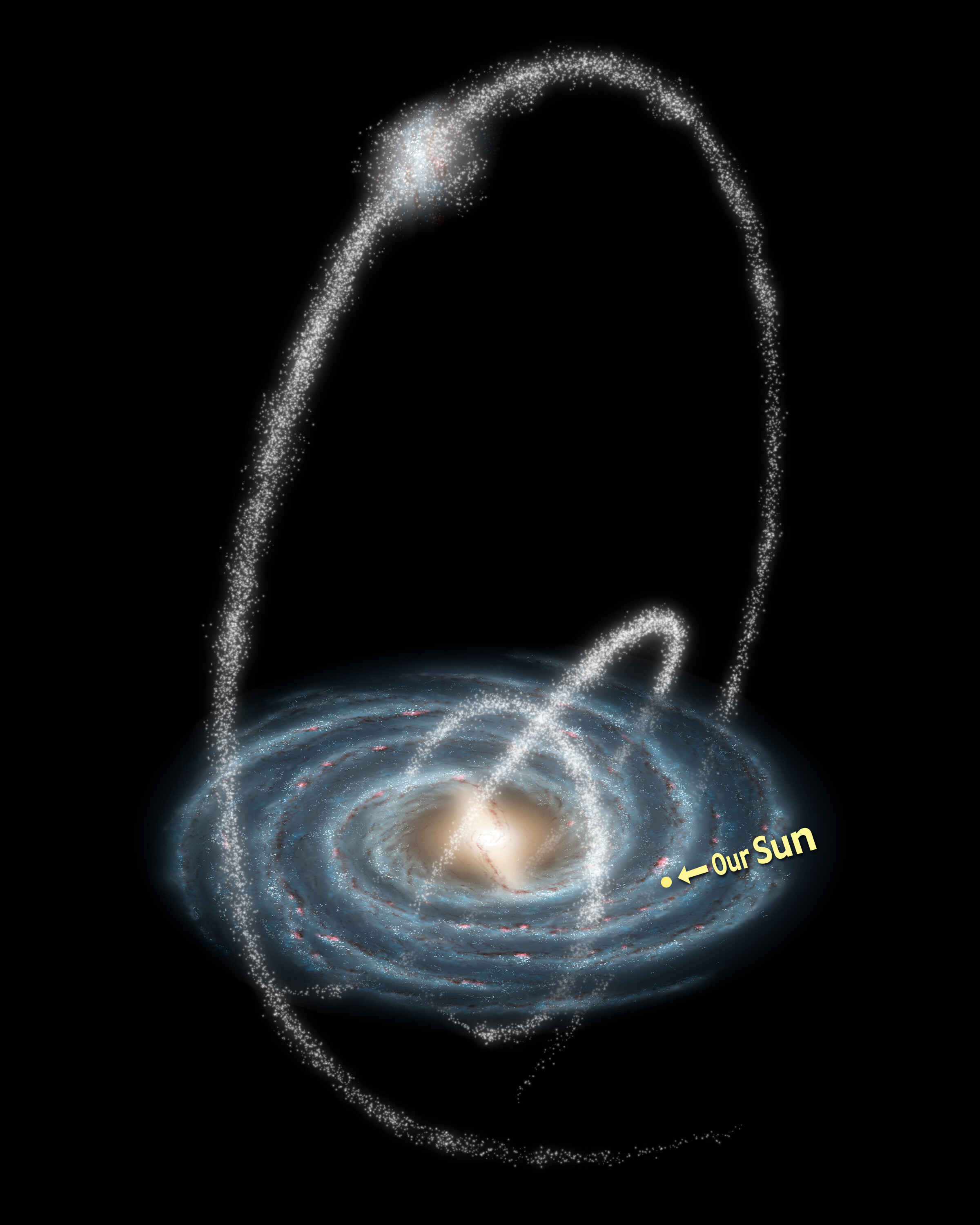
- Stellar streams (artist's impression)

Observation data (J2000 epoch)
- Constellation: Virgo
- Right ascension: ?
- Declination: ?
- Distance: 30 kly
- Apparent magnitude (V): ?
- Absolute magnitude (V): ?

Characteristics
- Type: remains of a dSph
- Apparent size (V): 30° × 10°

Other designations
- none

The Virgo Stellar Stream, also known as Virgo Overdensity, is the proposed name for a stellar stream in the constellation of Virgo which was discovered in 2005. The stream is thought to be the remains of a dwarf spheroidal galaxy that is in the process of merging with the Milky Way. It is the largest galaxy visible from the Earth, in terms of the area of the night sky covered.

The stream was discovered from photometric data from the Sloan Digital Sky Survey, which was used to create a three-dimensional map of the Milky Way, using the colors and brightness of certain characteristic types of stars to estimate their distance (a method known as "photometric parallax"). The first suggestion of a new galaxy in Virgo was made in 2001 from data obtained as part of the QUEST survey, which used the one-metre Schmidt telescope at the Llano del Hato National Astronomical Observatory in Venezuela to search for RR Lyrae variable stars. Five were found in a clump with a right ascension near 12.4 hours, and the astronomers speculated that this clump was part of a small galaxy being "cannibalised" by the Milky Way.

The stream covers over one hundred square degrees and possibly as much as one thousand square degrees (approximately five percent of the hemisphere visible at any one time, or five thousand times the area of the full moon). Despite its proximity to the Solar System and the solid angle that it consequently covers, the stream contains only a few hundred thousand stars. The low surface brightness of the galaxy (possibly as low as 32.5 mag/arcmin^{2}) may have militated against its detection in surveys before SDSS. The number of stars in the stream is not greatly in excess of a star cluster, and it has been described by a member of the team that discovered it as "a rather pathetic galaxy" in comparison to the Milky Way. Many of the stars have been known for centuries and thought of as normal Milky Way stars, although they have a lower metallicity than normal Population I stars in the Milky Way.

The stream lies within the Milky Way, approximately 10 kiloparsecs (30,000 light-years) from the Sun, and extending over a region of space at least 10 kpc across in three dimensions. It is close on the plane of the sky to the Sagittarius Dwarf Elliptical Galaxy, which was found in 1994 through a similar photometric analysis of a star survey. The Sagittarius Dwarf is another small galaxy which is also in the process of merging with the Milky Way; however, it is approximately 4 times further away than the stream, so the two are unlikely to be physically related, although it is possible that the Virgo Stellar Stream is a remnant left behind by the disruption of the Sagittarius Dwarf as it had orbited around the Milky Way. The Virgo Stellar Stream also resembles the Monoceros Ring, found in 2002, which has similarly been attributed to the Canis Major Dwarf Galaxy merging with the Milky Way.

== See also ==
- Local Group
- List of nearest galaxies
- List of stellar streams
- Satellite galaxies of the Milky Way
