= Nyx stream =

Proposed stellar stream

In astronomy, the Nyx stream is a proposed stellar stream that wraps around the Milky Way galaxy, passing relatively close to the sun. About 500 stars have been identified in this stream from the Gaia DR2. Elemental abundances of the most likely stellar members are consistent with the stream being a high velocity component of the Milky Way's thick disk, rather than having an extragalactic origin.

== See also ==
- List of stellar streams
