= Messier 32 =

Dwarf elliptical galaxy in the constellation Andromeda

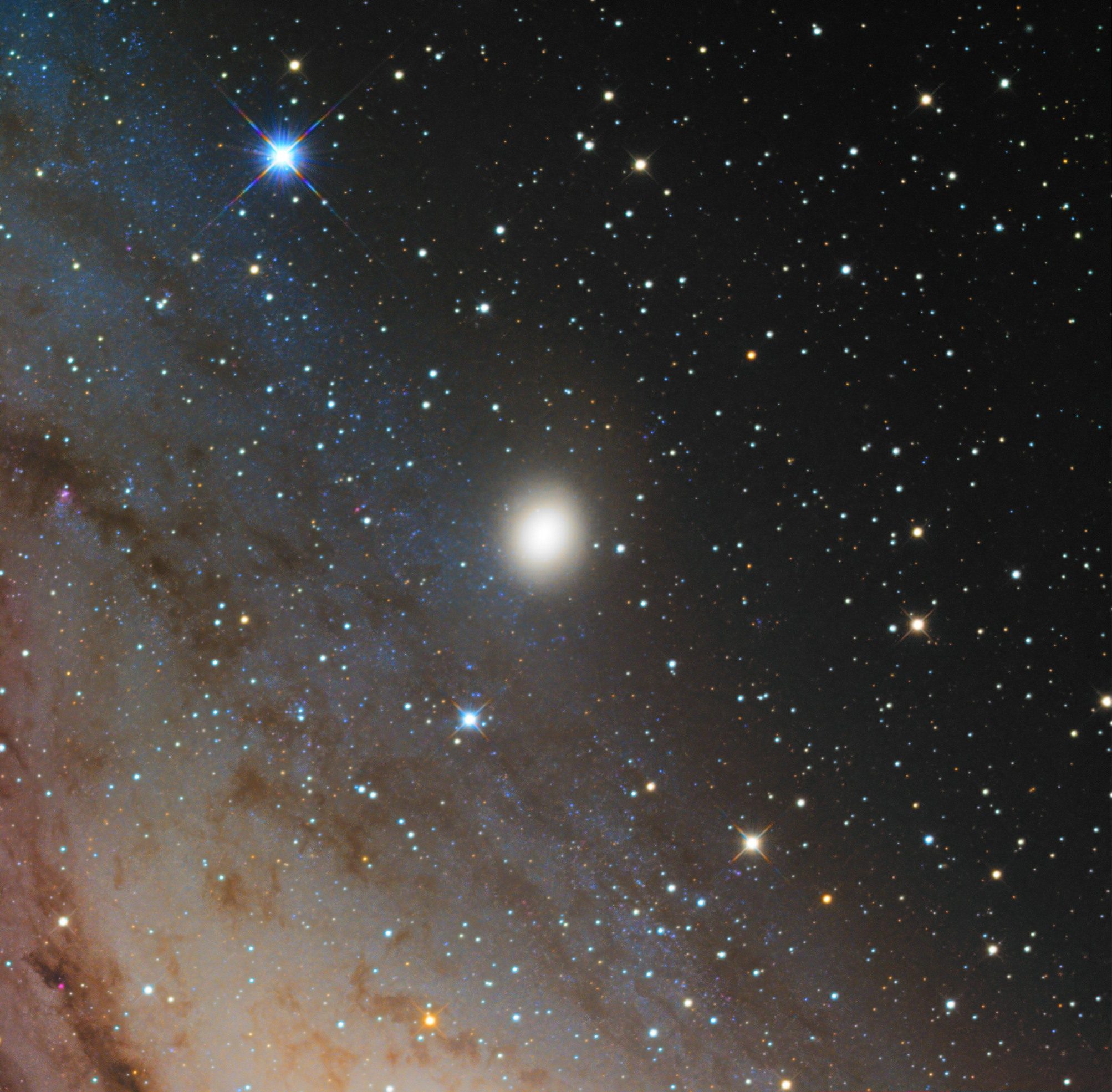
- Dwarf Satellite Galaxy Messier 32 (center)

Observation data (J2000 epoch)
- Constellation: Andromeda
- Right ascension: 00^{h} 42^{m} 41.8^{s}
- Declination: +40° 51′ 55″
- Redshift: −200 ± 6 km/s
- Distance: 2.49 ± 0.08 Mly (763 ± 24 kpc)
- Apparent magnitude (V): 8.08

Characteristics
- Type: cE2
- Size: 8,000 ly (2.46 kpc) (estimated)
- Apparent size (V): 8.7' × 6.5'
- Notable features: Satellite galaxy of the Andromeda Galaxy

Other designations
- M 32, NGC 221, UGC 452, PGC 2555, Arp 168, LEDA 2555

Messier 32 (also known as M32 and NGC 221) is a dwarf "early-type" galaxy about 2,490,000 light-years (760,000 pc) from the Solar System, appearing in the constellation Andromeda. M32 is a satellite galaxy of the Andromeda Galaxy (M31) and was discovered by Guillaume Le Gentil in 1749.

The galaxy is a prototype of the relatively rare compact elliptical (cE) class. Half the stars are concentrated within the inner core, which has an effective radius of 330 light-years (100 pc). Densities in the central stellar cusp increase steeply, exceeding 3×10^{7} M_{☉} pc^{−3} (30 million solar masses per cubic parsec) at the smallest sub-radii resolved by Hubble Space Telescope, and the half-light radius of this central star cluster is around 6 pc (20 light-years). Like more ordinary elliptical galaxies, M32 contains mostly old faint red and yellow stars with practically no dust or gas and consequently no current star formation. It does, however, show hints of star formation in the relatively recent past.

== Origins ==
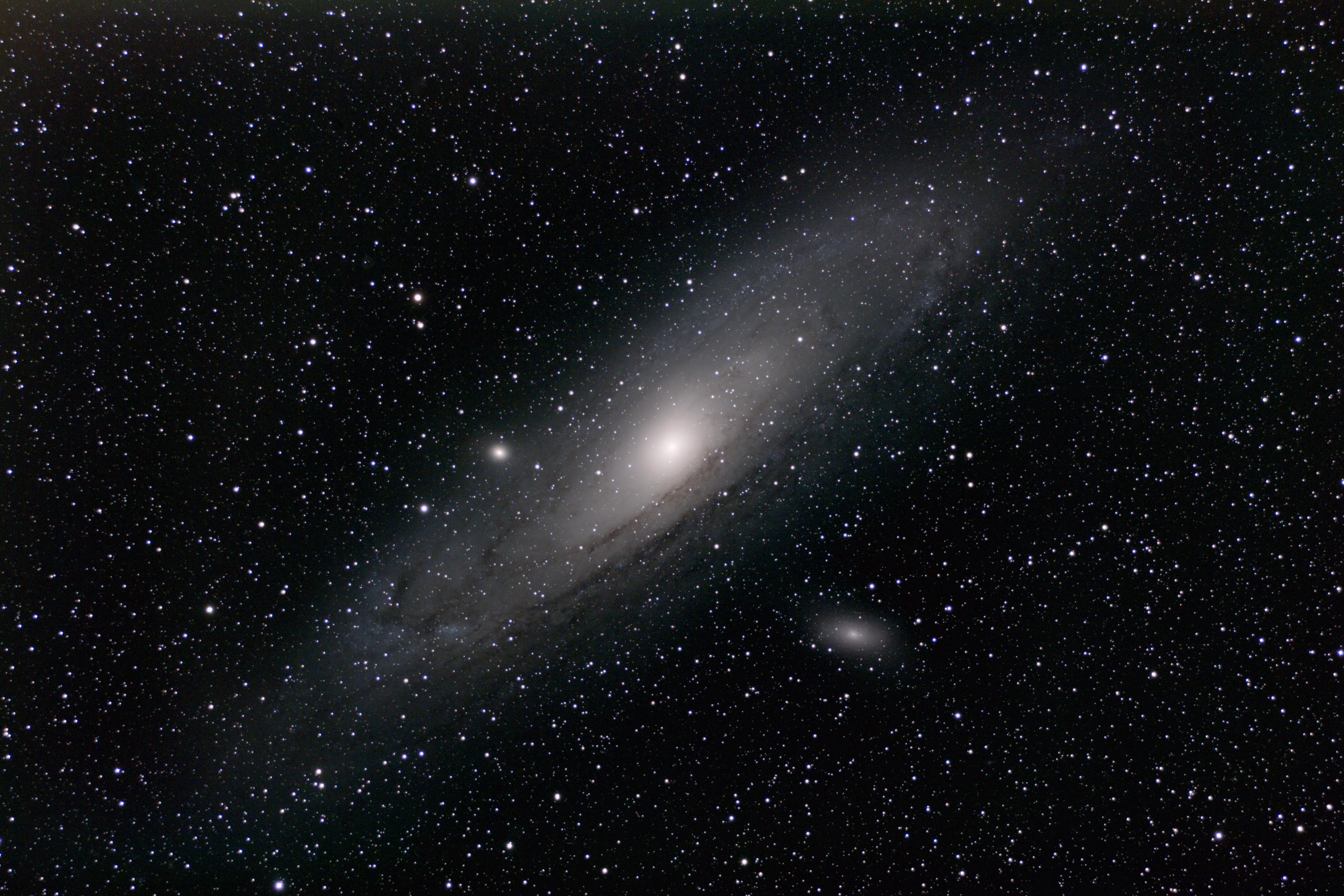
In this image of the Andromeda Galaxy, Messier 32 is to the left of the center.

The structure and stellar content of M32 are difficult to explain by traditional galaxy formation models. Theoretical arguments and some simulations suggest a scenario in which the strong tidal field of M31 can transform a spiral galaxy or a lenticular galaxy into a compact elliptical. As a small disk galaxy falls into the central parts of M31, much of its outer layers will be stripped away. The central bulge of the small galaxy is much less affected and retains its morphology. Gravitational tidal effects may also drive gas inward and trigger a star burst in the core of the small galaxy, resulting in the high density of M32 observed today. There is evidence that M32 has a faint outer disk, and as such is not a typical elliptical galaxy.

Newer simulations find that an off-centre impact by M32 around 800 million years ago explains the present-day warp in M31's disk. However, this feature only occurs during the first orbital passage, whereas it takes many orbits for tides to transform a normal dwarf into M32. The observed colours and stellar populations of M32's outskirts do not match the stellar halo of M31, indicating that tidal losses from M32 are not their source. Taken together, these circumstances may suggest that M32 already began in its compact state, and has retained most of its own stars. At least one similar cE galaxy has been discovered in isolation, without any massive companion to thresh it.

Another hypothesis is that M32 is in fact the largest remnant of a former spiral galaxy, M32p, which was then the third largest member of the Local Group. According to this simulation, M31 (Andromeda) and M32p merged about two billion years ago, which could explain both the unusual makeup of the current M31 stellar halo, and the structure and content of M32.

== Distance measurements ==
At least two techniques have been used to measure distances to M32. The infrared surface brightness fluctuations distance measurement technique estimates distances to spiral galaxies based on the graininess of the appearance of their bulges. The distance measured to M32 using this technique is 2.46 ± 0.09 million light-years (755 ± 28 kpc). However, M32 is close enough that the tip of the red giant branch (TRGB) method may be used to estimate its distance. The estimated distance to M32 using this technique is 2.51 ± 0.13 million light-years (770 ± 40 kpc). For several additional reasons, M32 is thought to be in the foreground of M31, rather than behind. Its stars and planetary nebulae do not appear obscured or reddened by foreground gas or dust. Gravitational microlensing of M31 by a star in M32 was observed at the end of November 2000 in one event (with peak on 2 December 2000).

== Black hole ==
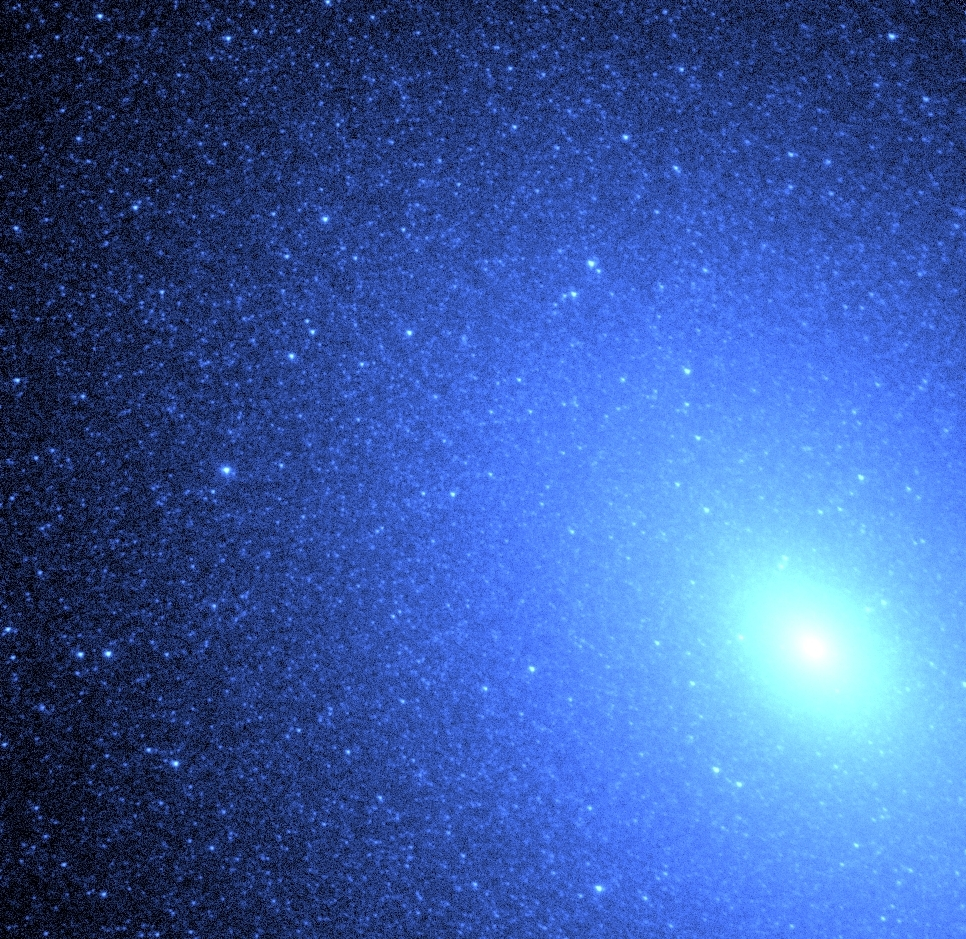
Hubble image of Messier 32 showing resolved central region

M32 contains a supermassive black hole. Its mass has been estimated to lie between 1.5 and 5 million solar masses. A centrally located faint radio and X-ray source (now named M32* in analogy to Sgr A*) is attributed to gas accretion onto the black hole.

== See also ==
- List of Messier objects
- List of Andromeda's satellite galaxies
- List of galaxies
