= GD-1 =

Stellar stream

GD-1 is a moving group of old, metal-poor stars located at 8.5 kpc above the galactic disk and spanning 80 degrees across the sky, first identified in 2006. The stream was formed after a globular cluster was disrupted by tidal forces, possibly from the gravitational field of the Milky Way. There are several gaps in the stream, as well as a 'spur' where part of the stream branches off from the main body. These features suggest that the stream was perturbed by another object. Clumps of dark matter have been theorised as responsible for these perturbations.

The stream's progenitor is believed to be a globular cluster based on the stream's radial velocity, location and the age of the stars within, but the specific cluster has not been identified. As the cluster passed near the Milky Way, stars were torn away from the main cluster and left a trail in the cluster's path, forming the stream.

The stream is located within the Field of Streams, a region of sky in the galactic northern hemisphere containing many stellar streams, the most prominent of which is the Sagittarius stream.
