= Canis Major Overdensity =

Disputed galaxy located near the constellation Canis Major

- Location of the Canis Major Overdensity (red circle)

Observation data (J2000 epoch)
- Constellation: Canis Major
- Right ascension: 07^{h} 12^{m} 35.0^{s}
- Declination: −27° 40′ 00″
- Distance: 25,000 ly

Characteristics
- Type: Irr
- Number of stars: 1 billion
- Apparent size (V): 12 degrees × 12 degrees

Other designations
- CMa Dwarf, PGC 5065047

The Canis Major Overdensity (CMa Overdensity) or Canis Major Dwarf Galaxy (CMa Dwarf) is a disputed dwarf irregular galaxy in the Local Group, located in the same part of the sky as the constellation Canis Major.

The supposed small galaxy contains a relatively high percentage of red giants and is thought to include an estimated one billion stars.

At the time of its announcement, the Canis Major Dwarf Galaxy was classified as an irregular galaxy and was thought to be the closest neighboring galaxy to the Earth's location in the Milky Way, located about 25,000 light-years (7.7 kiloparsecs) away from the Solar System and 42,000 ly (13 kpc) from the Galactic Center. It has a roughly elliptical shape and is thought to contain as many stars as the Sagittarius Dwarf Elliptical Galaxy, the previous contender for closest galaxy to Earth, though later studies disputed this conclusion.

== Discovery ==
An international team of French, Italian, British, and Australian astronomers reported the existence of a strong elliptical-shaped stellar overdensity in November 2003. They claimed their study pointed to a newly discovered dwarf galaxy: the Canis Major Dwarf Galaxy. This structure is located closer to the Sun than the center of the milky way, at approximately 7.7 kpc (25,000 ly) from the Sun.

The team of astronomers that discovered it was collaborating on the analysis of data from the Two-Micron All Sky Survey (2MASS), a comprehensive survey of the sky in infrared light, which is not blocked by gas and dust as severely as visible light. Because of this technique, scientists were able to detect a very significant overdensity of class M giant stars in a part of the sky occupied by the Canis Major constellation, along with several other related structures composed of this type of star, two of which form broad, faint arcs.

== Characteristics ==
Some astronomers believe that the CMa overdensity is a dwarf galaxy in the process of being pulled apart by the gravitational field of the more massive Milky Way galaxy. The main body of the CMa is extremely degraded. Tidal disruption causes a filament of stars to trail behind it as it orbits the Milky Way, forming a complex ringlike structure, sometimes referred to as the Monoceros Ring, which wraps around the Milky Way three times, The stream of stars was discovered in the early 21st century by astronomers conducting the Sloan Digital Sky Survey. The Monoceros Ring is similar to the Virgo Stellar Stream, which is thought to be the result of the Milky Way tearing stars and gases from the Sagittarius Dwarf Spheroidal Galaxy into a Stellar Stream. It was during the investigation of the Monoceros Ring, and a closely spaced group of globular clusters similar to those associated with the Sagittarius Dwarf Elliptical Galaxy, that the CMa Overdensity was discovered.

Globular clusters thought to be associated with the CMa include NGC 1851, NGC 1904, NGC 2298 and NGC 2808, all of which may have been part of the galaxy's globular cluster system before accreting into the Milky Way. NGC 1261 is another nearby cluster, but its velocity differs enough to make its relationship to the system unclear. Additionally, Dolidze 25 and H18 are open clusters that may have formed when the dwarf galaxy perturbed material in the galactic disk, stimulating star formation.

The discovery of the CMa and subsequent analysis of its associated stars has supported the current theory that galaxies may grow in size by swallowing their smaller neighbors. Martin et al. believe that the preponderance of evidence points to the accretion of a small satellite galaxy of the Milky Way, which was orbiting roughly in the plane of the galactic disk.

== Dispute ==
Several studies cast doubts on the true nature of this overdensity. Some research suggests that the trail of stars is part of the warped galactic thin disk and thick disk population and not a result of the collision of the Milky Way with a dwarf spheroidal galaxy. Investigation of the area in 2009 yielded only ten RR Lyrae variable stars, consistent with the Milky Way's halo and thick disk populations rather than a separate dwarf spheroidal galaxy.

== In fiction ==
British science fiction writer Stephen Baxter included the Canis Major Overdensity in his 2004 novella Mayflower II as the destination of the eponymous starship.

== See also ==
- Messier 79
- Galaxy formation and evolution
- Stellar kinematics
- Milky Way
- Sagittarius Dwarf Spheroidal Galaxy
- Monoceros Ring
- Virgo Stellar Stream
