= NGC 5466 =

Globular cluster in the constellation Boötes

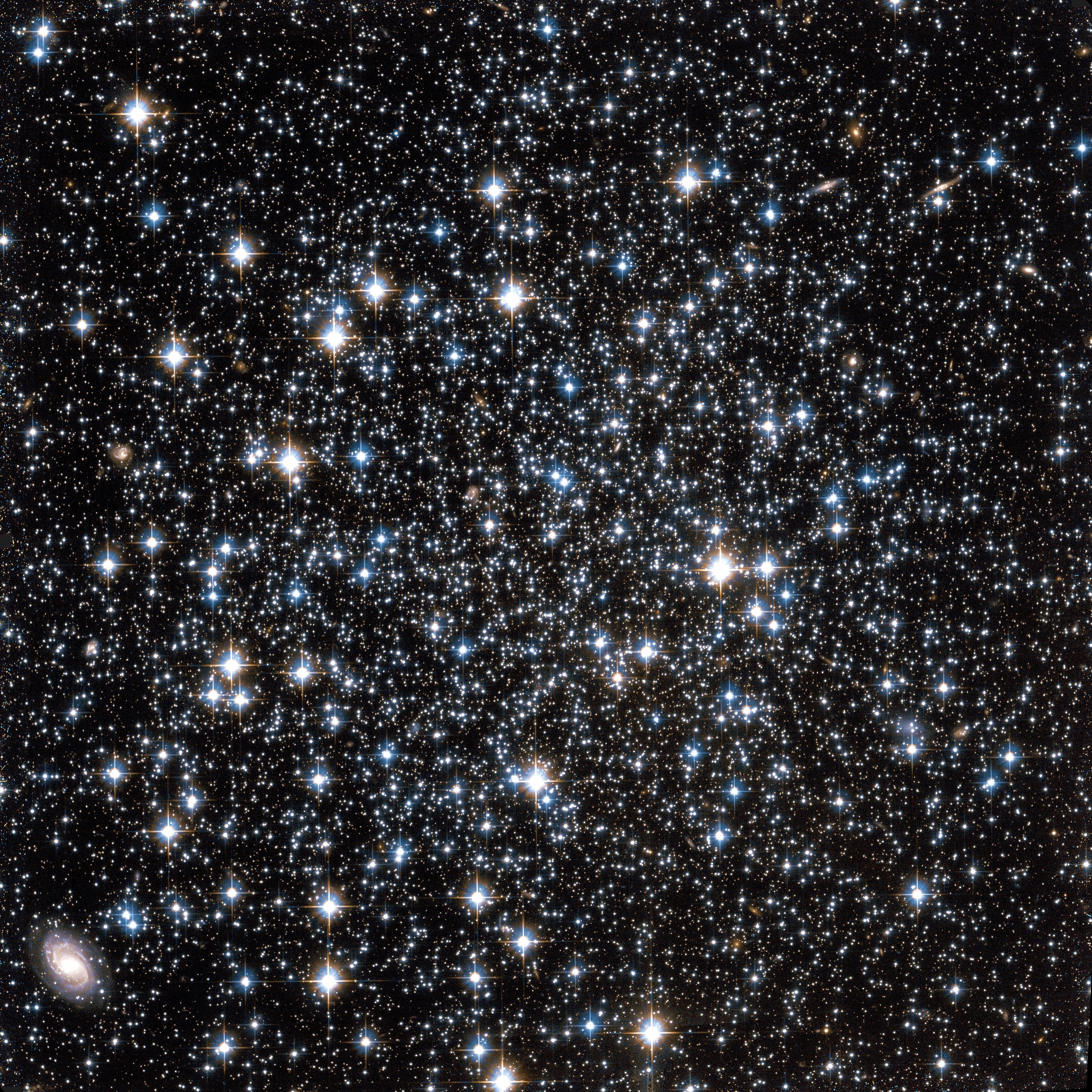
- NGC 5466 by Hubble Space Telescope; 3.5′ view

Observation data (J2000 epoch)
- Class: XII
- Constellation: Boötes
- Right ascension: 14^{h} 05^{m} 27.29^{s}
- Declination: +28° 32′ 04.0″
- Distance: 52.2 ± 1.3 kly (16.0 ± 0.4 kpc)
- Apparent magnitude (V): 9.2
- Apparent dimensions (V): 9.0′

Physical characteristics
- Absolute magnitude: −6.98
- Mass: 1.79×10^{5} M_{☉}
- Tidal radius: 238.0 ly (72.98 pc)
- V_{HB}: 16.47
- Metallicity: [Fe/H] = –1.95±0.02 dex
- Estimated age: 12.15±0.11 Gyr
- Notable features: Tidal stream
- Other designations: NGC 5466, C 1403+287, GCl 27, GC 3776, h 1746, H 6

NGC 5466, also known as the Snowglobe Cluster, is a globular cluster of stars in the constellation Boötes. It was discovered by German-British astronomer William Herschel on May 17, 1784, and catalogued as H VI.9. This large, dim cluster has an apparent visual magnitude of 9.2 and spans an angular size of 9.0′. It is relatively distant from the Sun, about 52 thousand light-years (16.0 kpc) away, and 53 thousand light-years (16.3 kpc) from the Galactic Center.

== Observations ==
The Shapley–Sawyer Concentration Class of NGC 5466 is XII. This is a loose cluster with an unusually low central density compared to other globulars with similar luminosity. It is located at a high galactic latitude and thus displays negligible reddening from interstellar dust. The cluster has a core radius of 1.43′±0.10′ and a half-light radius of 2.3′±0.07′. The King tidal radius is 238.0 ly (72.98 pc).

Observation of the distribution of stars in the cluster shows the impact of mass segregation, with heavier objects sinking toward the center. This is a dynamically young cluster that is just starting to evolve. An isochrone fit to the cluster yields an age estimate of 12.15±0.11 billion years. Other age estimates range from 12.2±0.9 to 13.57 Gyr, depending on the method. It has an extremely low metallicity.

In 2006, a long tidal stream was detected stretching from this cluster, perhaps reaching as far as 45° to 60° across the sky. It has a combined mass estimated as 4.0×10^{3} M_{☉}. The width dispersion of the stream is 1.31°±0.24°, corresponding to a physical width of 1,200 ± 220 ly (367 ± 67 pc) at the distance of the cluster. The presence of a tidal tail suggests the cluster has been strongly disrupted due to gravitational interactions with the Milky Way galaxy. At some point, this stream may have been tidally disrupted by the Large Magellanic Cloud.

A total of 97 blue straggler stars have been identified in this cluster, which show a mild central peak in distribution. In 2019, it was reported that a candidate hot white dwarf had been discovered orbiting a blue straggler star in the outskirts of NGC 5466. This was the second such pair discovered in a globular cluster. Three short period eclipsing binaries have been found along with six SX Phoenicis variables. This was the first globular where a blue straggler eclipsing variable was found. The cluster is host to the brightest-known anomalous Cepheid variable, designated V19.

== Gallery ==
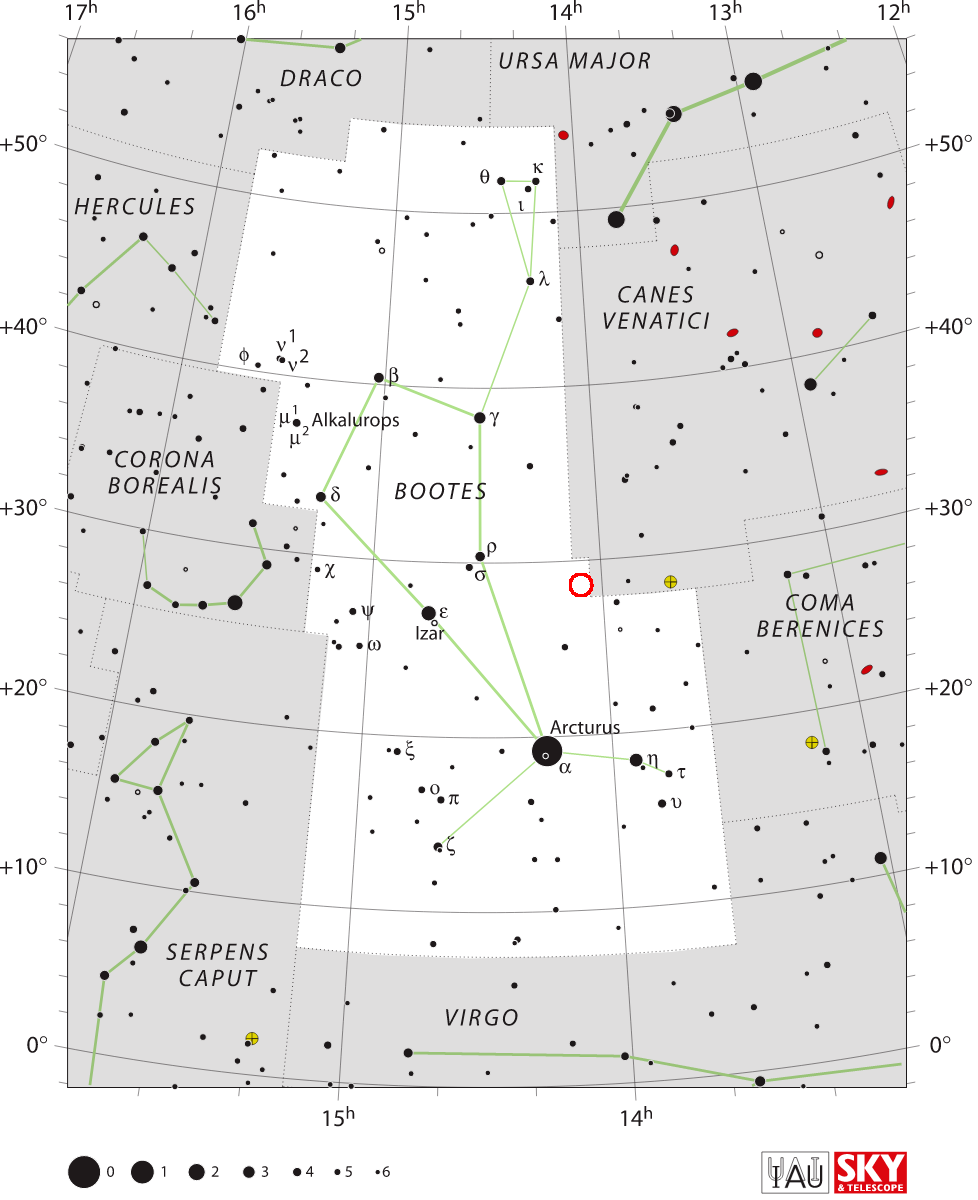
The location of NGC 5466 (circled in red)

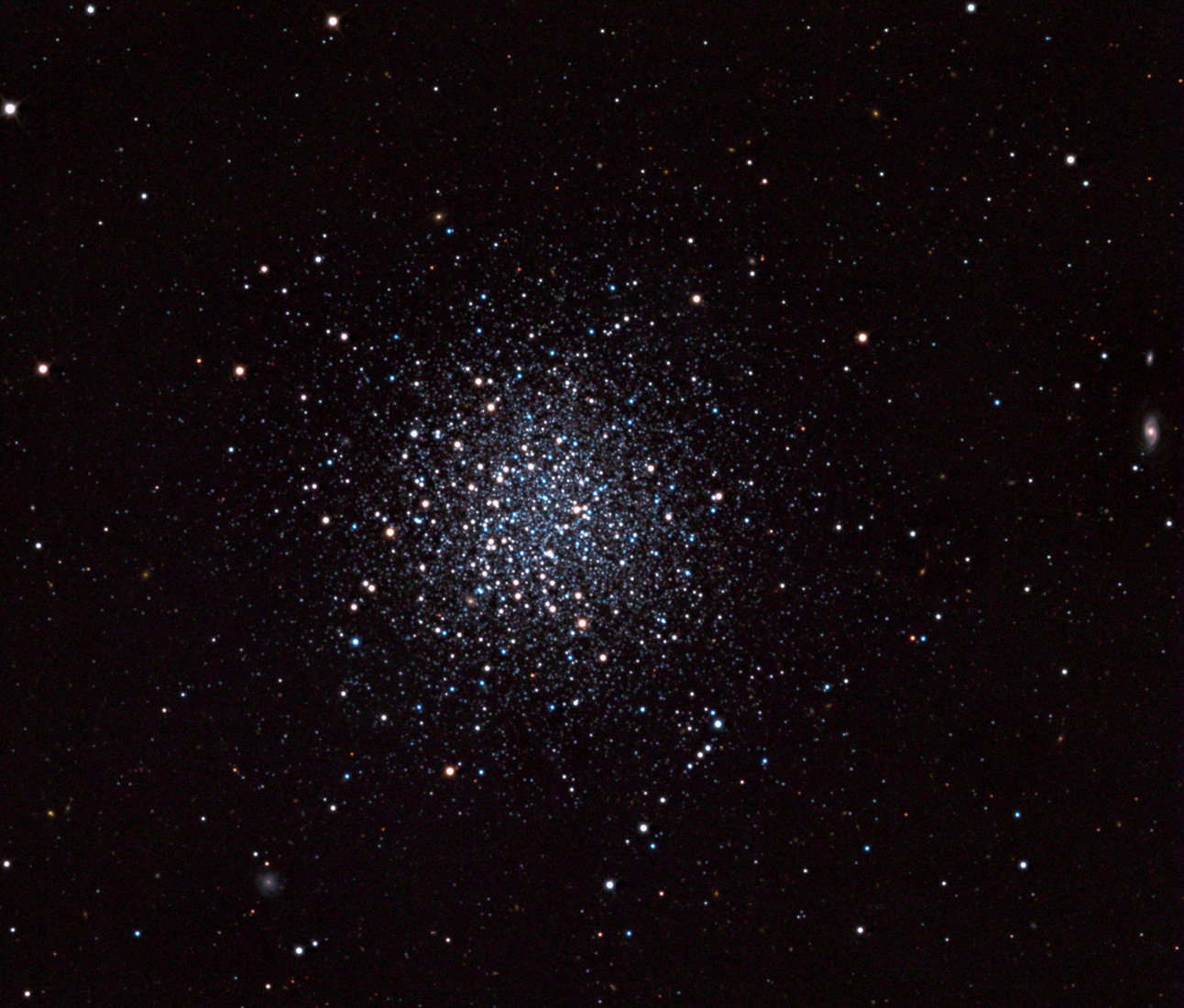
NGC 5466 imaged with a 32-inch telescope

== See also ==
- List of stellar streams
