= Fimbulthul stream =

Tidal stellar stream torn off from Omega Centauri

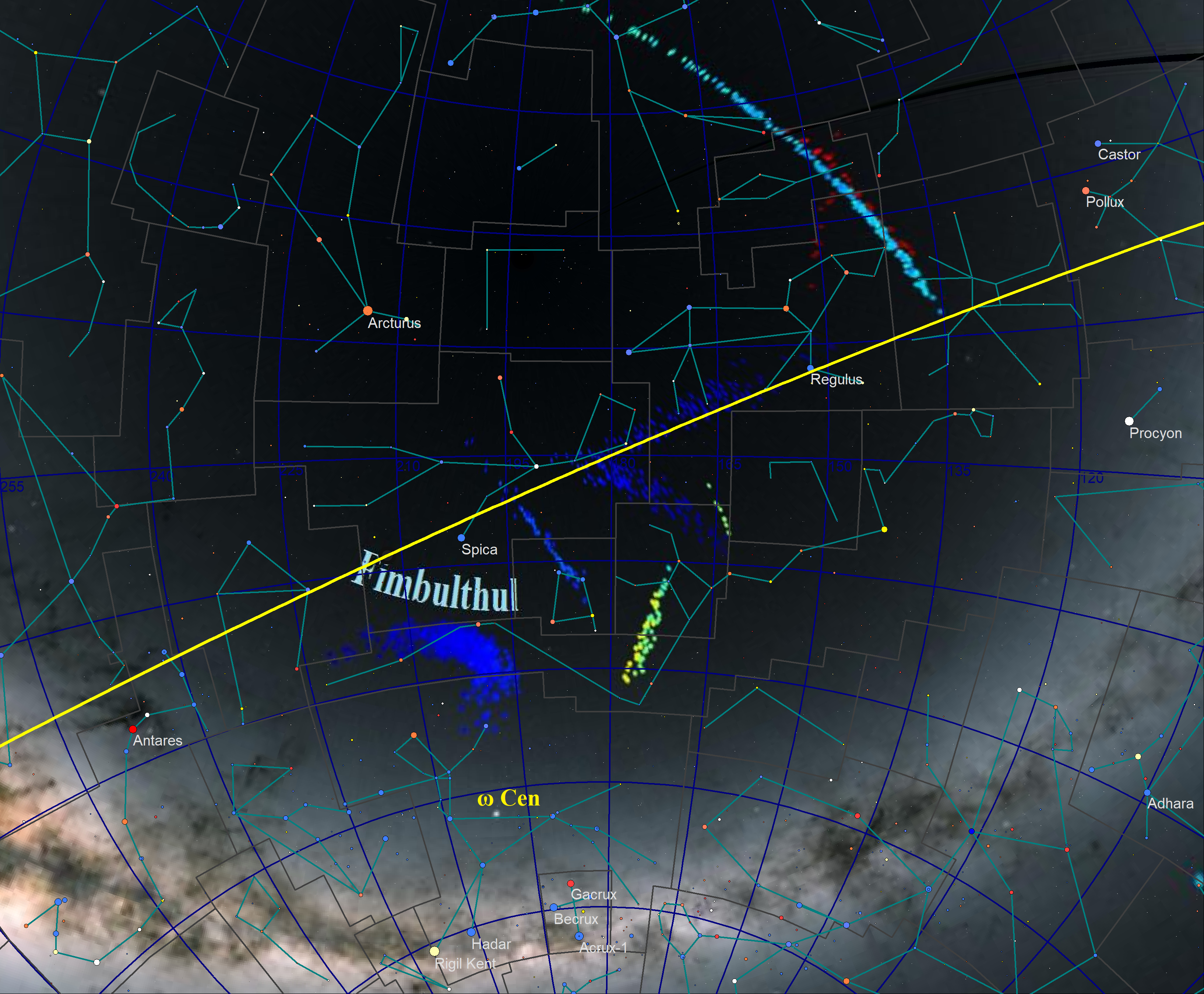
Fimbulthul stream is shown in blue. The ω Cen cluster is just below it.

Fimbulthul is a tidal stellar stream torn off from Omega Centauri, the largest globular cluster of our Milky Way galaxy. The stream contains 309 known stars stretching over 18° in the constellations of Hydra and Centaurus, matching the same age as the globular cluster. Omega Centauri is thought to be the nucleus of a dwarf galaxy that merged with the Milky Way.

The stream was discovered in the Gaia DR2 star database that determined the direction, distances and motion of over one billion stars.

The name Fimbulthul is a river in Norse mythology.

== See also ==
- List of stellar streams
