= NGC 5286 =

Globular cluster in the constellation Centaurus

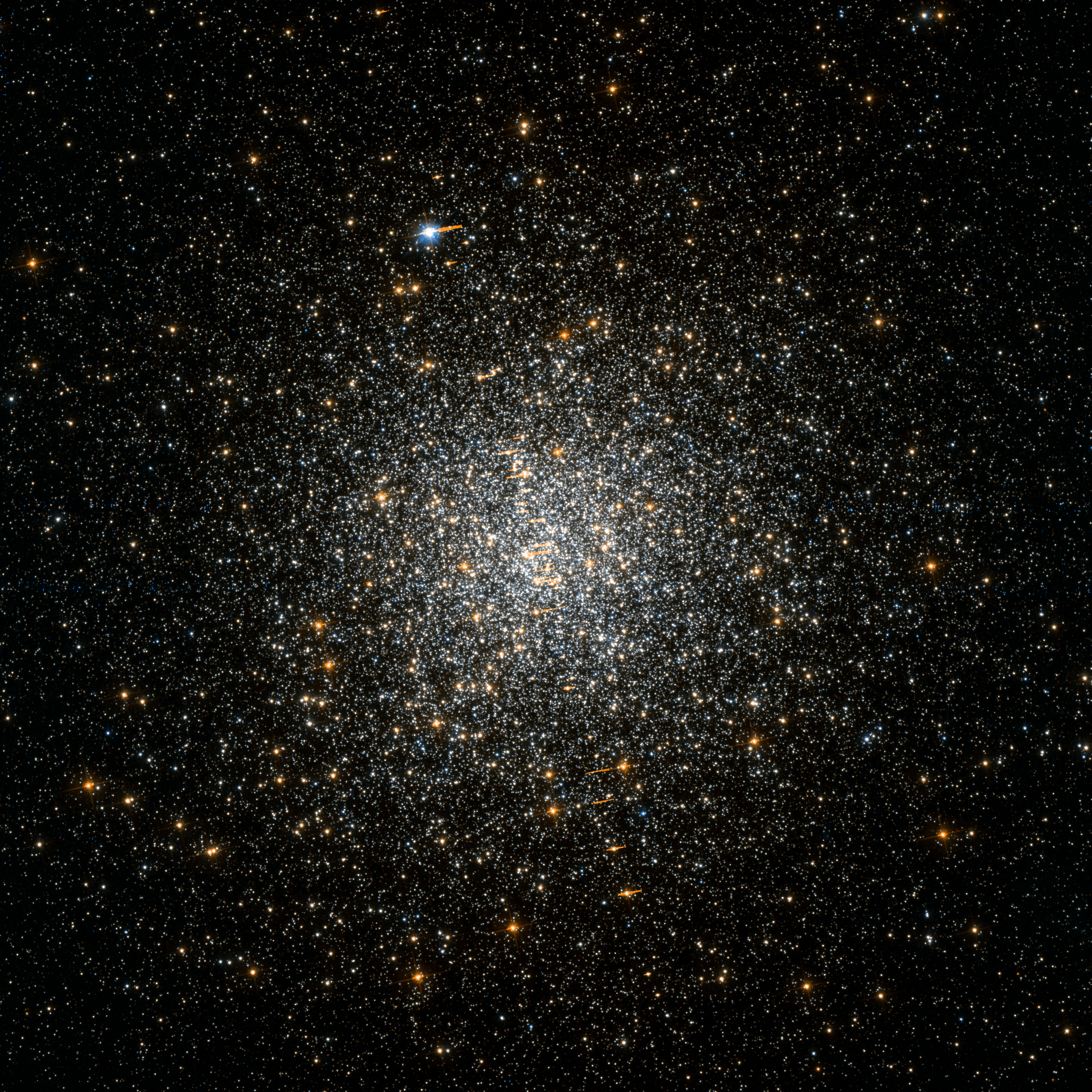
- NGC 5286 imaged by the Hubble Space Telescope

Observation data (J2000 epoch)
- Class: V
- Constellation: Centaurus
- Right ascension: 13^{h} 46^{m} 26.81^{s}
- Declination: –51° 22′ 27.3″
- Distance: 35.9 kly (11.0 kpc)
- Apparent magnitude (V): 7.6
- Apparent dimensions (V): 9.1'

Physical characteristics
- Mass: 7.13×10^{5} M_{☉}
- Metallicity: [Fe/H] = –1.41 dex
- Estimated age: 12.54 Gyr
- Other designations: Caldwell 84

NGC 5286 (also known as Caldwell 84) is a globular cluster of stars located some 35,900 light years away in the constellation Centaurus. At this distance, the light from the cluster has undergone reddening from interstellar gas and dust equal to E(B – V) = 0.24 magnitude in the UBV photometric system. The cluster lies 4 arc-minutes north of the naked-eye star M Centauri. It was discovered by Scottish astronomer James Dunlop, active in Australia, and listed in his 1827 catalog.

This cluster is about 29 kly (8.9 kpc) from the Galactic Center and is currently orbiting in the Milky Way halo. It may be associated with the Monoceros Ring—a long tidal stream of stars that could have been formed from a disrupted dwarf galaxy. NGC 5286 may be one of the oldest globular clusters in the galaxy, with an estimated age of 12.54 billion years. It is not perfectly spherical, but has a projected ellipticity of 0.12.

The velocity dispersion of stars at the center of the cluster is (8.1 ± 1.0) km/s. Based upon the motions of stars at the core of this cluster, it may host an intermediate mass black hole with less than 1% of the cluster's mass. The upper limit for the mass estimate of this object is 6,000 times the mass of the Sun.

NGC 5286 is part of the Gaia Sausage, the hypothesised remains of a merged dwarf galaxy.
