= FSR 1758 =

Large, bright but obscured globular cluster belonging to the Milky Way Galaxy

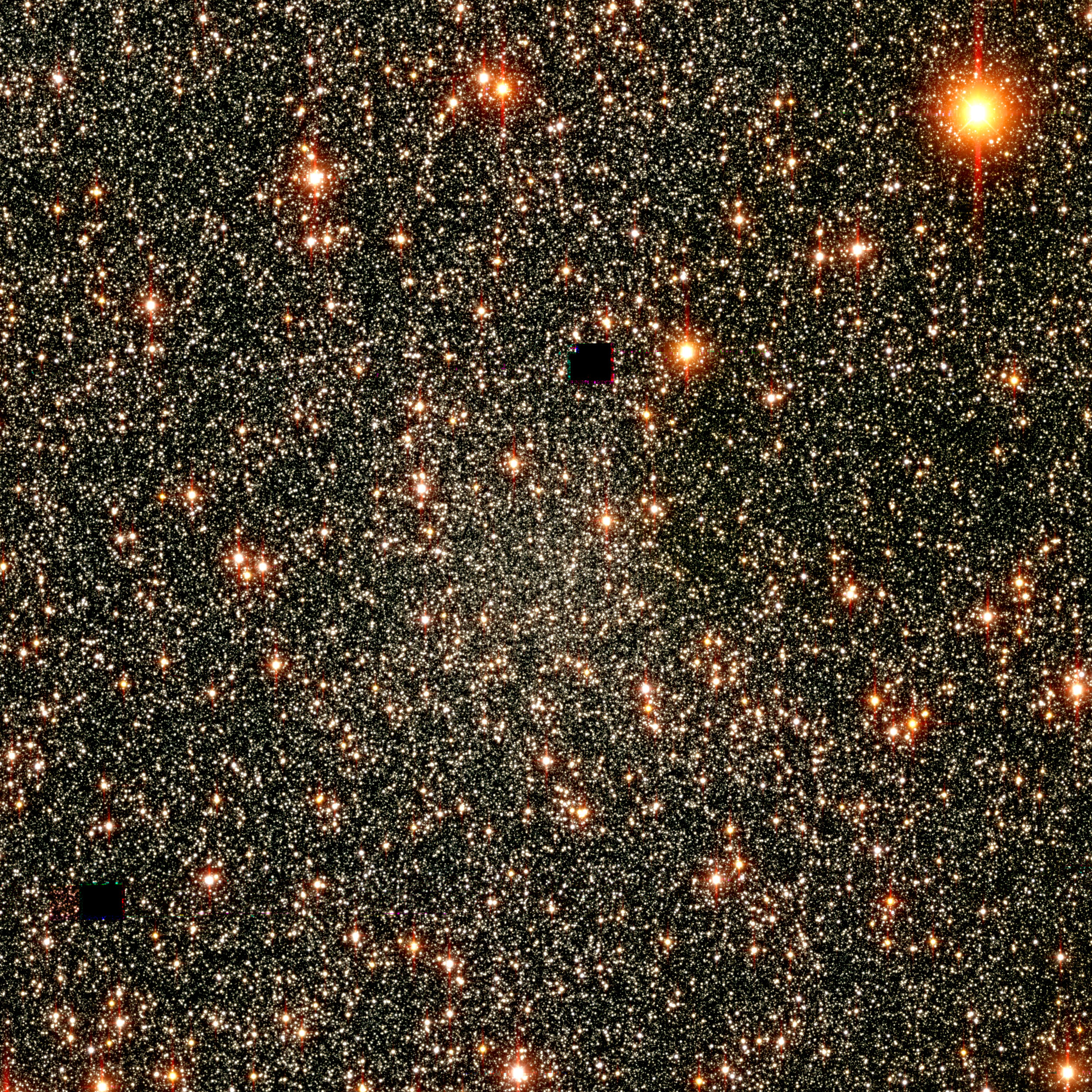
- The Sequoia Cluster (FSR 1758) in near-infrared Credit: Legacy Surveys / D. Lang (Perimeter Institute) & Meli thev

Observation data (J2000 epoch)
- Constellation: Scorpius
- Right ascension: 17^{h} 31^{m} 12^{s}
- Declination: −39° 48′ 30″
- Distance: 11.5 kpc (38 kly)
- Apparent magnitude (V): <7
- Apparent dimensions (V): 1.56 ± 0.44 °

Physical characteristics
- Absolute magnitude: <–8.6
- Mass: ~10^{7} M_{☉}
- Radius: 10 ± 1 pc
- Tidal radius: 150 ± 45 pc
- Metallicity: [Fe/H] = −1.5 dex
- Notable features: Possible nucleus of a dwarf galaxy

FSR 1758 (also known as the Sequoia Cluster) is a large and bright but heavily obscured globular cluster belonging to the Milky Way galaxy. It is located at a distance of about 11.5 kpc from the Sun and about 3.7 kpc from the center of the galaxy. As FSR 1758 lies behind the galactic bulge, it is heavily obscured by the foreground stars and dust. It was first noticed in 2007 in 2MASS data and believed to be an open cluster, until data from the Gaia mission revealed in 2018 that it is a globular cluster.

The size and brightness of FSR 1758 may be comparable to or exceed that of the Omega Centauri cluster, which is widely believed to be the nucleus of a dwarf galaxy that merged into Milky Way in the past. Therefore, FSR 1758 may be the nucleus of a dwarf galaxy tentatively named Scorpius Dwarf galaxy. It may also be similar to another globular cluster, Messier 54, which is known to be the nucleus of Sagittarius Dwarf Spheroidal Galaxy.

After Barbá et al. used the term Sequoia to describe the size of FSR 1758, Myeong et al. used the term Sequoia in a slightly different way. They believe that FSR 1758 was one of five globular clusters that populated a dwarf galaxy that Myeong et al. re-name as the Sequoia dwarf galaxy. This dwarf was accreted into the Milky Way in the Sequoia Event. The members of Sequoia have a retrograde galactic orbit. This term has been adopted by several other groups.

In 2025 a study used the Very Large Telescope to observe the metal-poor star BPM 3066, which is a candidate member of the Sequoia galaxy or the accreted Thamnos galaxy. The star is in a retrograde galactic orbit. The star showed unusual high amounts of lithium and beryllium in its spectrum. One suggestion is that it was close to a hypernova in the past. Some chemical abundance speaks for this hypothesis, some other abundance measurements speak against the hypernova hypothesis. An alternative is that the star engulfed a rocky planet that was rich in lithium and beryllium.
