= Lethe stream =

Stellar stream in the Milky Way

The Lethe stream is a stellar stream in the Milky Way Galaxy, consisting of approximately 1100 stars. It was discovered by Carl J. Grillmair in 2008 along with the Acheron, Cocytos and Styx streams, and moves with an average tangential velocity of $v_T=113\pm12.5~\mathrm{m/s}$. The name of this stream stems from Lethe, the mythical river of unmindfulness in Hades.

The stars in the Lethe stream are not in the plane of the Milky Way and are proposed to have originated from the debris of a globular cluster. Evidence supporting this theory of origin is taken by comparing Lethe's stars to the color magnitude diagrams (CMDs) from the Sloan Digital Sky Survey (SDSS). The stream's stellar population consists of old, metal-poor stars with an approximate metallicity of $[\mathrm{Fe/H}]\sim-1.5$. Along with it being dynamically cold and having a relatively narrow width of $\sim95~\text{pc}$, these are indicators that the Lethe stream is composed of the remnants of an either extant or disrupted globular cluster instead of debris from a dwarf galaxy.

The stream was first described in 2009 by Carl Grillmair using data from the SDSS recorded at the Apache Point Observatory in New Mexico.

== See also ==
- List of stellar streams
