= M32p =

Former spiral galaxy

Observation data
- Constellation: Andromeda
- Group or cluster: Local Group

Characteristics
- Mass: 2.5×10^{10} M_{☉}

M32p is a hypothesized former galaxy that was incorporated into the Andromeda Galaxy. It was a sister galaxy to the Milky Way and Andromeda galaxies, previously the third or fourth largest galaxy in the Local Group, and was merged into the larger Andromeda Galaxy an estimated 2 billion years ago. The merger is thought to have created the thick disc and contributed the majority of the halo stars of Andromeda and caused its burst of star formation at the time of the merger. The former galaxy is likely associated with the Andromeda satellite galaxy Messier 32 (M32), which may be the remains of its dense core. M32's unusual characteristics of dense compactness and burst of star formation 2 billion years ago would be explained by this model as a remnant of an earlier large galaxy, given its unlikeness to other similarly sized elliptical galaxies.

It was described in 2018 by scientists at the University of Michigan. It is thought to have had a stellar mass of around 2.5×10^{10} M_{☉}.

== See also ==
- Sausage Galaxy, cause for the Milky Way's thick disc and many halo stars.
