= M Centauri =

Star in the constellation Centaurus

- Location of M Centauri (circled in red)

Observation data Epoch J2000.0 Equinox ICRS
- Constellation: Centaurus
- Right ascension: 13^{h} 46^{m} 39.378^{s}
- Declination: −51° 25′ 57.95″
- Apparent magnitude (V): +4.63

Characteristics
- Spectral type: G8/K0III
- B−V color index: +0.955

Astrometry
Radial velocity (R_{v})	−15.97±2.25 km/s
Proper motion (μ)	RA: +10.00(42) mas/yr Dec.: −27.62(34) mas/yr
Parallax (π)	12.42±0.48 mas
Distance	260 ± 10 ly (81 ± 3 pc)
Absolute magnitude (M_{V})	+0.11

Orbit
Primary	M Centauri A
Name	M Centauri B
Period (P)	437 days
Semi-major axis (a)	6.45 mas
Eccentricity (e)	0.13
Inclination (i)	48.2°
Longitude of the node (Ω)	280.3°
Periastron epoch (T)	2424163.0
Argument of periastron (ω) (secondary)	58.6°

Other designations
- M Cen, CD−50°8017, GC 18607, HD 119834, HIP 67234, HR 5172, SAO 241157, CCDM J13467-5126A

Database references
SIMBAD	data

M Centauri (M Cen) is a binary star in the constellation Centaurus. It is approximately 260 light-years from Earth.

M Centauri is a yellow G-type giant with an apparent magnitude of +4.64. It is a spectroscopic binary with an orbital period of 437 days.

This star appears next to the globular cluster NGC 5286 in the sky.
