= LAMOST 1 =

Star cluster in the Draco constellation

Observation data (J2000 epoch)
- Right ascension: 18^{h} 18^{m}
- Declination: +52.3°
- Distance: 8500 (2600)

Physical characteristics
- Mass: 21000 ± 4000 M_{☉}
- Estimated age: 11.0 Gyr
- Other designations: LAMOST 1 Stream

Associations
- Constellation: Draco

LAMOST 1 is a star cluster in the constellation Draco. It has been disrupted and consists of a comoving star-stream with about 25,000 stars. The stars are in an elliptical orbit near their apocenter (furthest point) about 8,500 light years distant in the Milky Way. The stars have similar age and metallicity. The stars were discovered in spectra from the Large Sky Area Multi-Object Fibre Spectroscopic Telescope.

== See also ==
- List of stellar streams
