= LAMOST J112456.61+453531.3 =

Star in the constellation Ursa Major

- Location of J1124+4535 in the constellation Ursa Major (marked with a red dot)

Observation data Epoch J2000 Equinox J2000
- Constellation: Ursa Major
- Right ascension: 11^{h} 24^{m} 56.6107^{s}
- Declination: +45° 35′ 31.3073″
- Apparent magnitude (V): 13.979

Characteristics
- B−V color index: 0.850

Astrometry
Proper motion (μ)	RA: −0.857±0.025 mas/yr Dec.: −6.784±0.031 mas/yr
Parallax (π)	0.0577±0.0226 mas
Distance	approx. 60,000 ly (approx. 17,000 pc)

Details
Temperature	4897.5 K

Database references
SIMBAD	data

LAMOST J112456.61+453531.3 (unofficial abbreviation J1124+4535) is a magnitude 13.98 star in the constellation Ursa Major, below the "bowl" of the Big Dipper. It is located approximately 60,000 light-years from Earth.

Initial observations of J1124+4535 by the Large Sky Area Multi-Object Fibre Spectroscopic Telescope showed low amounts of magnesium, and later, the Subaru Telescope confirmed the low amounts of magnesium and also found high amounts of europium. J1124+4535 also lacks the same observable chemical signature as other stars in its parent interstellar cloud, indicating that J1124+4535 did not form in the cloud, confirming that the star must have formed outside the Milky Way.

The star's origin was most likely the result of a dwarf galaxy collision with the Milky Way some 5 to 9 billion years ago. The remnants of the destroyed galaxy can still be seen as the most visible streams of the galactic halo.
