= Field of Streams =

Patch of sky where several stellar streams are visible and cross

The Field of Streams is a patch of sky where several stellar streams are visible and crisscross.

It was discovered by Vasily Belokurov and Daniel Zucker's team in 2006 by analyzing the Sloan Digital Sky Survey II (SDSS-II) data. The team named the area Field of Streams because of so many crisscrossing trails of stars.

The Sagittarius Stream of the Sagittarius Dwarf Elliptical Galaxy (SagDEG) dominates the Field. It has a split trail within the area of the Field of Streams, because SagDEG has wrapped around the Milky Way Galaxy multiple times, which has resulted in overlapping trails. The forking of the trail has made it possible to infer the organization of dark matter in the inner halo of the Milky Way Galaxy, resulting in the determination that it is distributed in a round spherical manner, as opposed to the expected flattened spheroid. The shape of the streams also implies that the dark matter is very cold, due to the thin trails, and persisting existence.

Also appearing in the Field is the Monoceros Ring, which was discovered before the Field.

== See also ==
- Stellar stream
- List of stellar streams
