= NGC 2298 =

Globular cluster in the constellation Puppis

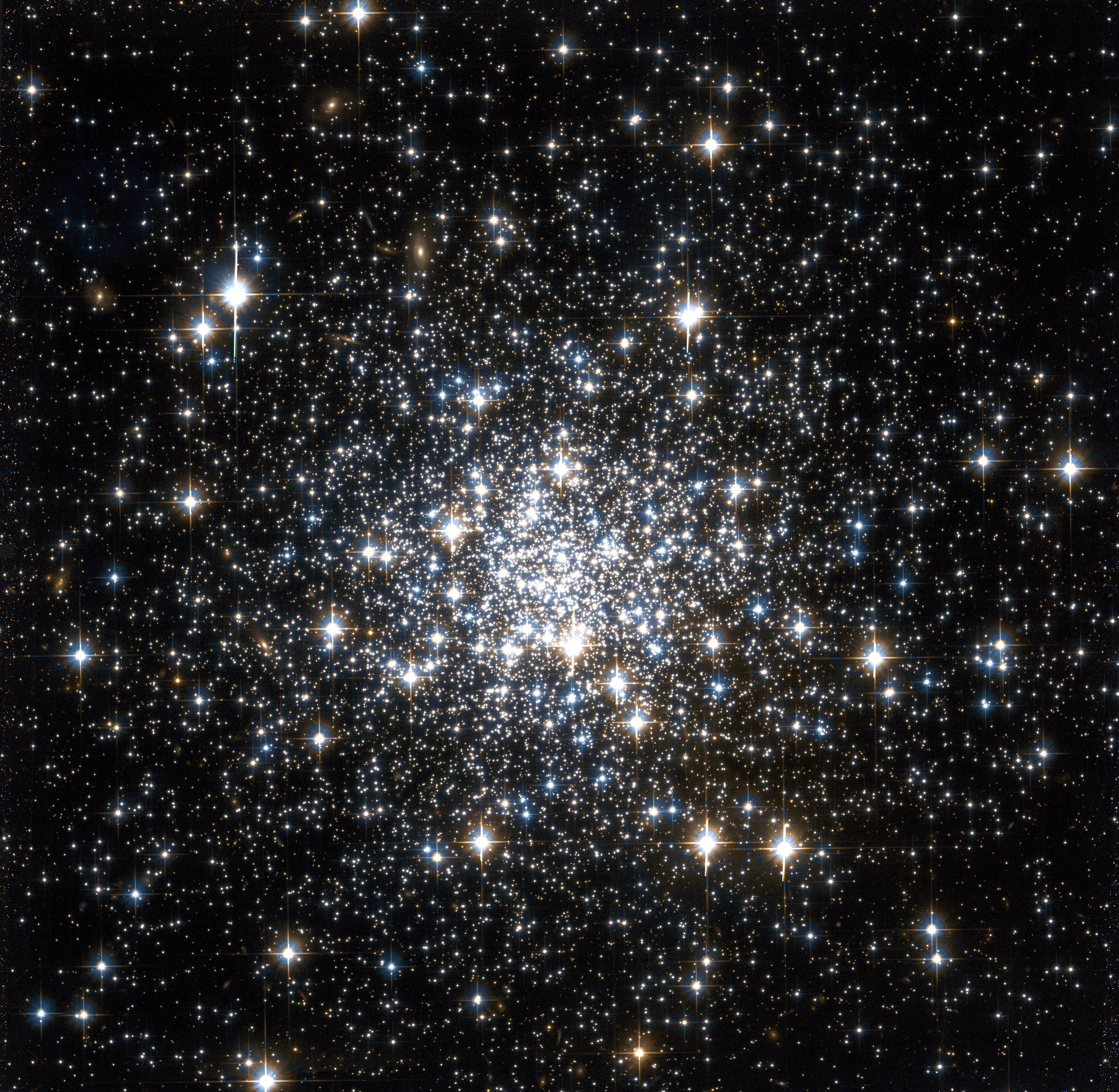

Observation data (J2000 epoch)
- Class: VI
- Constellation: Puppis
- Right ascension: 06^{h} 48^{m} 59.4^{s}
- Declination: −36° 00′ 19″
- Distance: 34.9 kly (10.7 kpc)
- Apparent magnitude (V): 9.3

Physical characteristics
- Absolute magnitude: −5.85
- Metallicity: [Fe/H] = −1.76 ± 0.14 dex
- Estimated age: 13.2±0.4 Gyr
- Other designations: Melotte 53

NGC 2298 is a globular cluster in the southern constellation of Puppis. Discovered by James Dunlop on May 30, 1826, it is probably a former member of the disputed Canis Major Dwarf galaxy.

The cluster is being disrupted by the galactic tide, trailing a long tidal tail.
