= NGC 1851 =

Globular cluster in the constellation Columba

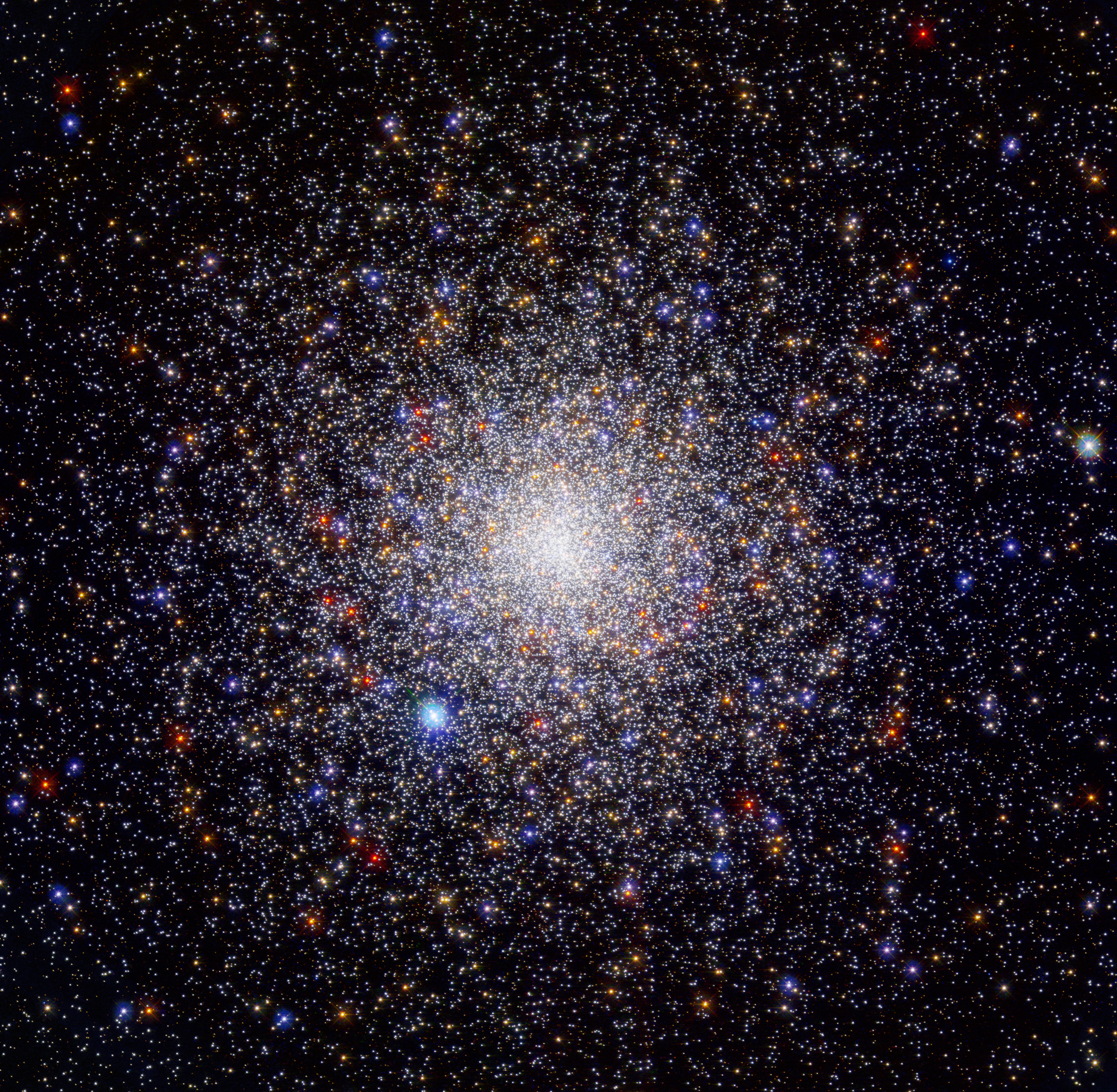
- Hubble image of NGC 1851

Observation data (J2000 epoch)
- Class: II
- Constellation: Columba
- Right ascension: 05^{h} 14^{m} 06.76^{s}
- Declination: –40° 02′ 47.6″
- Distance: 39.5 kly (12.1 kpc)
- Apparent magnitude (V): 7.3
- Apparent dimensions (V): 11′

Physical characteristics
- Absolute magnitude: −7.80
- Mass: 5.51×10^{5} M_{☉}
- Metallicity: [Fe/H] = −1.27 dex
- Estimated age: 9.2 Gyr
- Other designations: GCl 9, ESO 305-SC 016, Caldwell 73, Melotte 30

NGC 1851 (also known as Caldwell 73) is a relatively massive globular cluster located in the southern constellation of Columba. Astronomer John Dreyer described it as not very bright but very large, round, well resolved, and clearly consisting of stars. It is located 39.5 kilolight-years from the Sun, and 54.1 kilolight-years from the Galactic Center. The cluster is following a highly eccentric orbit through the galaxy, with an eccentricity of about 0.7.

This object has a Shapley–Sawyer Concentration Class of II, indicating a dense central concentration. It has one of the highest concentrations known for Galactic globular clusters. The stellar components show two separate populations of subgiant stars, with the brighter branch being more concentrated in the outer regions of the cluster. NGC 1851 is an estimated 9.2 billion years old with 551,000 times the mass of the Sun.

The cluster is surrounded by a diffuse halo of stars that stretches outward to a radius of 240 pc or more. This feature, if combined with the lack of tidal tail or associated stream of stars, suggests the cluster may be a stripped dwarf galaxy nucleus, similar to Omega Centauri, that has been accreted by the Milky Way. The tidal tail is still present though. It is also possible the cluster is the result of the merger of two separate clusters, but the fact that they would need to have the same metallicity – what astronomers term the abundance of elements other than hydrogen and helium – makes this scenario less likely.

PSR J0514-4002A is a millisecond pulsar in NGC 1851. It is orbiting a massive object that may also be a neutron star. The pair have an orbital period of 18.8 days with a large eccentricity of 0.89. A nearby pulsar PSR J0514−4002E is orbiting a massive object which appears to occupy the "mass gap" between the heaviest neutron stars and the lightest black holes, making it an unusual star system which may be useful for studying theories of gravity. The TRAPUM Large Survey Project using the MeerKAT radio telescope discovered thirteen new pulsars in the cluster, which consist of six isolated millisecond pulsars (MSPs) and seven binary pulsars, of which six are MSPs and one is mildly recycled. 43 RR Lyrae variables have been discovered in the cluster, which show this to be an Oosterhoff type I cluster but having properties similar to type II. Two populations of horizontal branch stars have been observed, with the pair having an age difference of around two billion years. Spectroscopic analysis of the red giant branch member stars suggests there are actually three different populations of stars in the cluster.

== Possible central black hole ==
Based on the eccentricity of some pulsars, the cluster's core may contain a central intermediate-mass black hole with a mass of up to 7,500 M⊙, .
