= Messier 79 =

Globular cluster in constellation Lepus

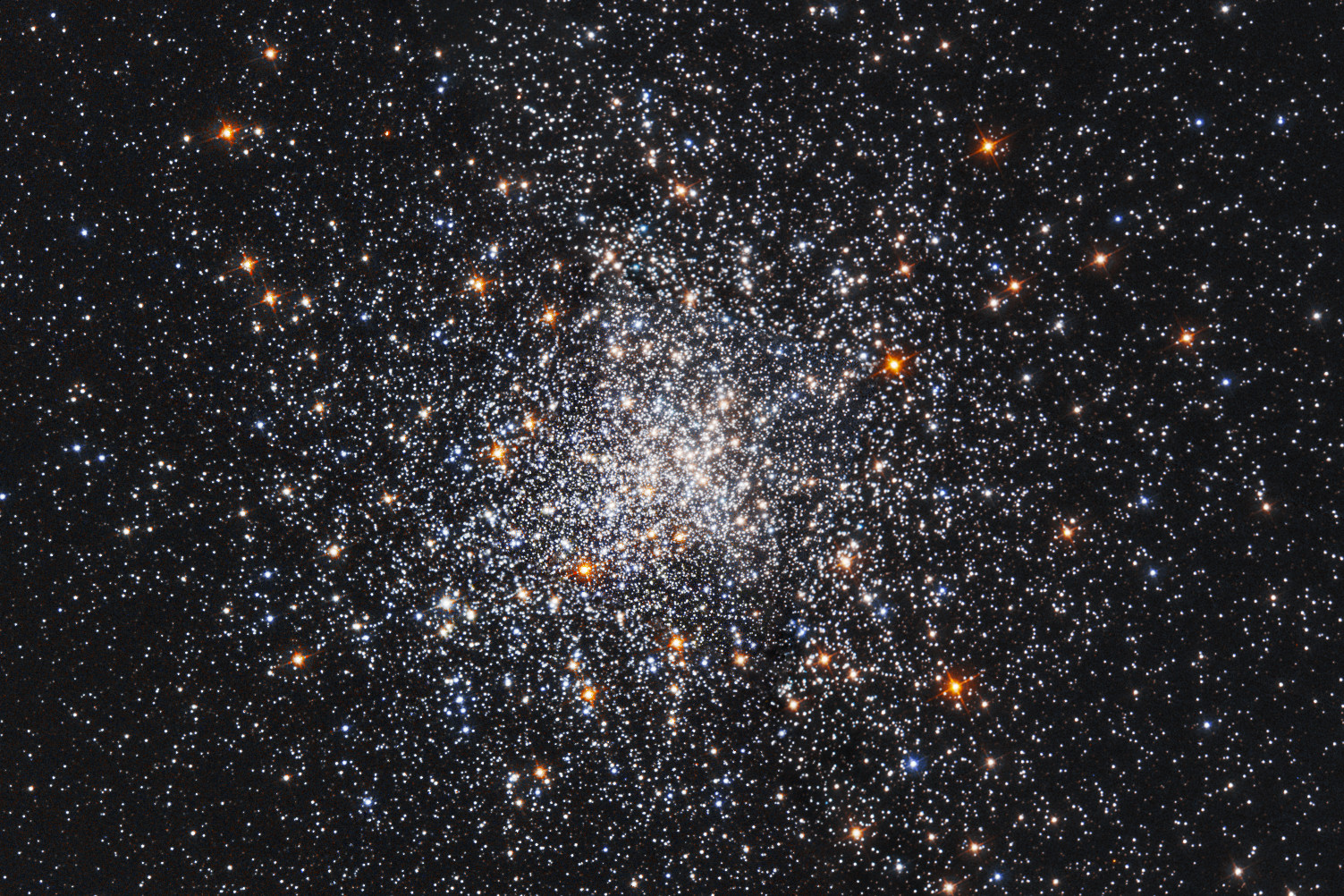

Observation data (J2000 epoch)
- Class: V
- Constellation: Lepus
- Right ascension: 05^{h} 24^{m} 10.59^{s}
- Declination: −24° 31′ 27.3″
- Distance: 12.9 kpc (42 kly)
- Apparent magnitude (V): 7.7
- Apparent dimensions (V): 8.7'

Physical characteristics
- Radius: 53 ly
- Metallicity: [Fe/H] = –1.55 dex
- Estimated age: 11.7 Gyr
- Other designations: M79, NGC 1904, GCl 10, Melotte 34

Messier 79 (also known as M79 or NGC 1904) is a globular cluster in the southern constellation Lepus. It was discovered by Pierre Méchain in 1780 and is about 42,000 light-years away from Earth and 60,000 light years from the Galactic Center.

Like Messier 54 (the other extragalactic globular on Messier's list), it is believed to not be native to the Milky Way galaxy at all, but instead to the putative Canis Major Dwarf Galaxy, which is currently experiencing a very close encounter with our galaxy. This is, however, a contentious subject as astronomers are still debating the nature of the Canis Major dwarf galaxy itself. Messier 79 may also be part of the Gaia Sausage.

The cluster is being disrupted by the galactic tide, trailing a long tidal tail.

== Color-magnitude diagram ==
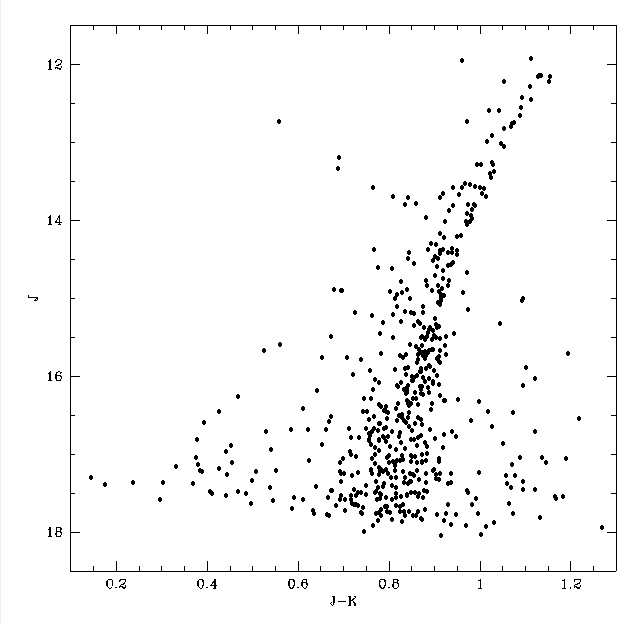
An infrared color-magnitude diagram of Messier 79

This color-magnitude diagram was made using near-infrared images of the cluster in J and K bands. J-band magnitude is plotted along the y-axis and J to K dominant color is plotted along the x-axis. Such a diagram is made rapidly with specialized code for crowded-field photometry.

From this, it is evident that most of the bright stars in this cluster are red giants. The elongated branch is the red giant branch. Some of the stars in the diagram, including those extending outward from the red giant branch toward the upper left, are actually foreground stars that are not members of the cluster.

Altogether three regions of the Hertzsprung–Russell diagram are present here: the low-mass end of the main sequence, the complete red giant branch and the horizontal branch. Compared to optical bands, in infrared bands the lower main sequence is shallower and the horizontal branch is steeper (the blue end is fainter and the red end is brighter).

== See also ==
- List of Messier objects
