= Monoceros Ring =

Complex, ringlike filament of stars wrapped around the Milky Way

The Milky Way Galaxy.

The Monoceros Ring (from Greek monoceros 'unicorn') is a long, complex ring of stars that wraps around the Milky Way three times. This is proposed to consist of a stellar stream torn from the Canis Major Dwarf Galaxy by tidal forces as part of the process of merging with the Milky Way over a period of billions of years, although this view has long been disputed. The ring contains 100 million solar masses and is 200,000 light years long.

The stream of stars was first reported in 2002 by astronomers conducting the Sloan Digital Sky Survey. In the course of investigating this ring of stars, and a closely spaced group of globular clusters similar to those associated with the Sagittarius Dwarf Elliptical Galaxy, they discovered the Canis Major Dwarf Galaxy.

== Dispute ==
In 2006, a study using 2MASS data cast doubts on the nature of the "Ring", arguing that the data suggests that the ring is actually part of the warped galactic disc of the Milky Way. However, observations using the Anglo-Australian Telescope published in 2007 suggest that a warped disc cannot create the observed structure, which must therefore be formed either by a flare of the galactic disc or have an extra-galactic origin.

Several members of the scientific community restated their position in 2012, affirming the Monoceros structure is nothing more than an over-density produced by the flared and warped thick disk of the Milky Way.

In 2015, building on the 2002 studies which revealed the Monoceros Ring, M.L. Martialay and colleagues sorted through galactic data from the Sloan Digital Sky Survey suggested that the Milky Way is actually 50 percent larger than previously thought, showing that disk of the Milky Way is not just a disk of stars in a flat plane, but is instead corrugated. As it radiates outward from the Sun, there appear to be at least four ripples in the disk of the Milky Way. Scientists assume that this pattern is going to be found throughout the disk. However, a more recent 2018 paper later somewhat ruled out this hypothesis, and supported a conclusion that the Monoceros Ring, A13 and TriAnd Ring were stellar overdensities rather kicked out from the main stellar disk, with the velocity dispersion of their constituent RR Lyrae variable stars found to be higher and consistent with halo membership.

Using the distance of the Monoceros Ring, the diameter of the Milky Way has been claimed to extend as much as 150,000 to 180,000 light years across. In this revised paradigm, the Solar System lies about halfway between the core and the edge. However, it is more common in the astronomical literature to define the sizes of galaxies using other methods, notably by the D_{25} isophote and variations of the half-light radius. An earlier study in 1998 using the D_{25} isophote gave a diameter for the Milky Way at 26.8 ± 1.1 kiloparsecs (87,400 ± 3,590 ly).

N-body simulations have been used to investigate the possible location of the progenitor of this structure and these calculations show that, if the Ring has a dwarf galaxy progenitor, it might be found in the background of one out of eight specific areas in the sky. A subsequent analysis, that used Gaia DR2 data, found a bimodal Gaussian distribution towards Galactic coordinates (271, +2) degrees in Vela, which is one of the locations of the progenitor proposed in the previous study. This finding may signal the presence of the progenitor of the Monoceros Ring, but the authors indicate that it might also be compatible with the existence of an unrelated kinematically coherent structure.

== See also ==
- List of stellar streams
