= Omega Centauri =

Globular cluster in the constellation Centaurus

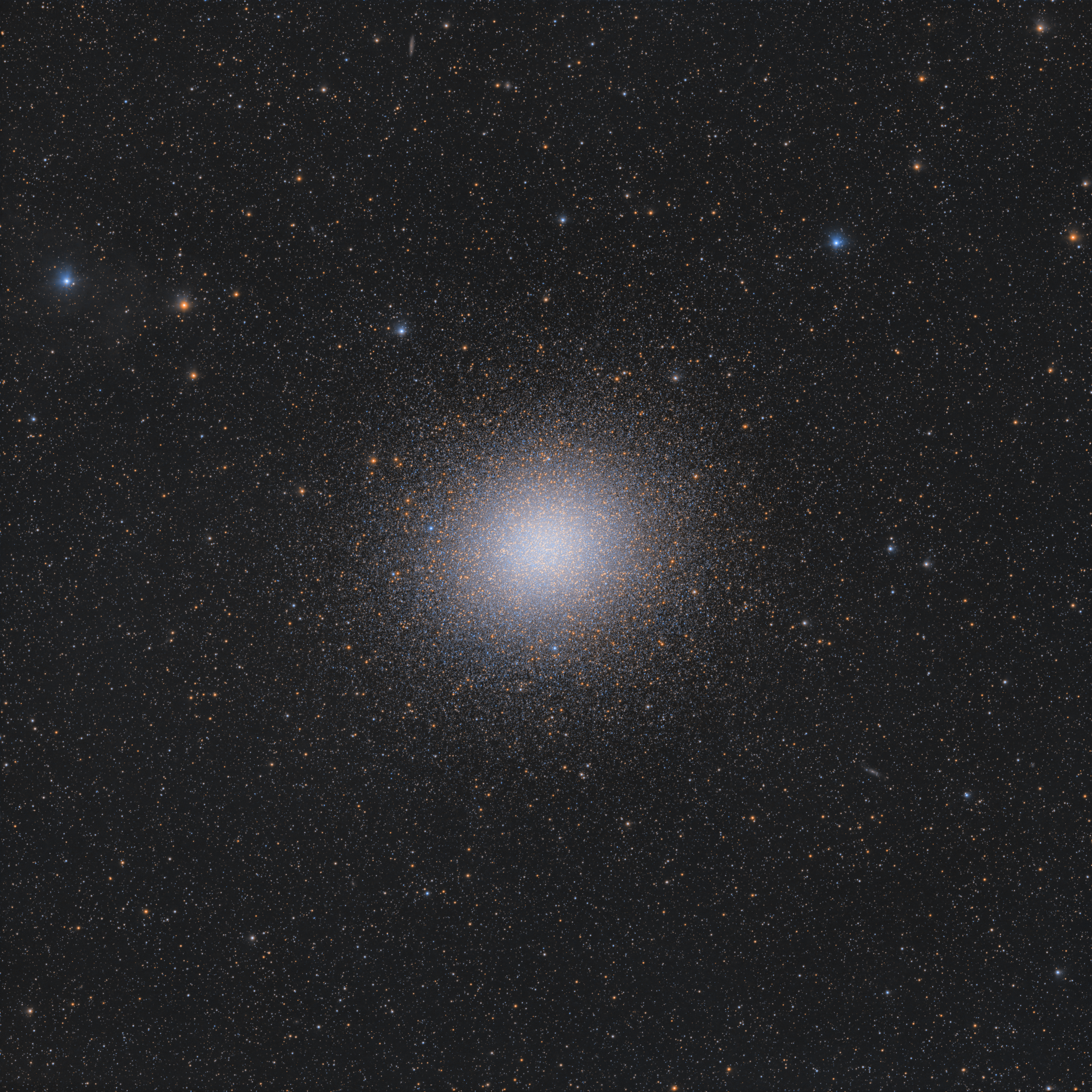
- The globular cluster Omega Centauri

Observation data (J2000 epoch)
- Class: VIII
- Constellation: Centaurus
- Right ascension: 13^{h} 26^{m} 47.28^{s}
- Declination: −47° 28′ 46.1″
- Distance: 15.8 ± 1.1 kly (4.84 ± 0.34 kpc)
- Apparent magnitude (V): 3.9
- Apparent dimensions (V): 36′.3

Physical characteristics
- Mass: (4.05±0.1)×10^{6} M_{☉}
- Radius: ~225 ly 86±6 ly
- Metallicity: [Fe/H] = –1.35 dex
- Estimated age: 11.52 Gyr
- Other designations: NGC 5139, GCl 24, ω Centauri, Caldwell 80, Mel 118

Omega Centauri (ω Cen, NGC 5139, or Caldwell 80) is a globular cluster in the constellation of Centaurus that was first identified as a non-stellar object by Edmond Halley in 1677. Located at a distance of 17,090 light-years (5,240 parsecs), it is the largest known globular cluster in the Milky Way at a diameter of roughly 150 light-years. It is estimated to contain approximately 10 million stars, with a total mass of 4 million solar masses, making it the most massive known globular cluster in the Milky Way.

Omega Centauri is very different from most other galactic globular clusters to the extent that it is thought to have originated as the core remnant of a disrupted dwarf galaxy. There is evidence of an intermediate-mass black hole in the dense core of this cluster, although this is disputed.

== Observation history ==
Around 150 AD, Greco-Roman writer and astronomer Ptolemy catalogued this object in his Almagest as a star on the centaur's back, "Quae est in principio scapulae". German cartographer Johann Bayer used Ptolemy's data to designate this object "Omega Centauri" with his 1603 publication of Uranometria. Using a telescope from the South Atlantic island of Saint Helena, English astronomer Edmond Halley observed this object in 1677, listing it as a non-stellar object. In 1716, it was published by Halley among his list of six "luminous spots or patches" in the Philosophical Transactions of the Royal Society.

Swiss astronomer Jean-Philippe de Cheseaux included Omega Centauri in his 1746 list of 21 nebulae, as did French astronomer Lacaille in 1755, whence the catalogue number is designated L I.5. It was first recognized as a globular cluster by Scottish astronomer James Dunlop in 1826, who described it as a "beautiful globe of stars very gradually and moderately compressed to the centre".

== Properties ==
At a distance of about 17,000 light-years (5,200 parsecs) from Earth, Omega Centauri is one of the few globular clusters visible to the naked eye—and appears almost as large as the full Moon when seen from a dark, rural area. It is the brightest, largest and, at 4 million solar masses, the most massive-known globular cluster associated with the Milky Way. Of all the globular clusters in the Local Group of galaxies, only Mayall II in the Andromeda Galaxy is brighter and more massive. Orbiting through the Milky Way, Omega Centauri contains several million Population II stars and is about 12 billion years old. It has a diameter of about 450 light years.

The stars in the core of Omega Centauri are so crowded that they are estimated to average only 0.1 light-year away from each other. The internal dynamics have been analyzed using measurements of the radial velocities of 469 stars. The members of this cluster are orbiting the center of mass with a peak velocity dispersion of 7.9 km s^{−1}. The mass distribution inferred from the kinematics is slightly more extended than, though not strongly inconsistent with, the luminosity distribution.

=== Members ===
These stars are the well studied members of the cluster. Some are abundant in metals and elements. (eg. Iron, Carbon, Oxygen)

Star Name	Spectral type	Star Type
Central Black Hole	BH(IMBH)	Intermediate Mass Black Hole
Variable Star 2	M III	Red Giant M type AGB Variable (Semi Regular)
Variable Star 6	M III	Red Giant M type AGB Variable (Semi Regular)
Variable Star 42	M III	Red Giant M type AGB Variable (Semi Regular)
Variable Star 147	M III	Red Giant M type AGB Variable (Semi Regular)
ROA 102	M III	Red Giant M type RGB
Omega Centauri 65	K III	Orange Giant K type RGB
Omega Centauri 74	K III	Orange Giant K type RGB
Omega Centauri 91	K III	Orange Giant K type RGB
Omega Centauri 101	K III	Orange Giant K type RGB
Star #124	K III	Orange Giant K type RGB
ROA 24	K III	Orange Giant K type RGB
ROA 46	K III	Orange Giant K type RGB
ROA 65	K III	Orange Giant K type RGB
ROA 74	K III	Orange Giant K type RGB
ROA 91	K III	Orange Giant K type RGB
ROA 101	K III	Orange Giant K type RGB
ROA 123	K III	Orange Giant K type RGB
ROA 139	K III	Orange Giant K type RGB
ROA 256	K III	Orange Giant K type RGB
ROA 270	K III	Orange Giant K type RGB
ROA 276	K III	Orange Giant K type RGB
ROA 577	K III	Orange Giant K type RGB
(An unnamed star)	K III	Orange Giant K type RGB Red Straggler CH Star
Variable Star 1	G III	Yellow Giant Variable (RR Lyrae type)
Variable Star 15	G III	Yellow Giant
ROA 279	G III	Yellow Giant

=== Evidence of a central black hole ===
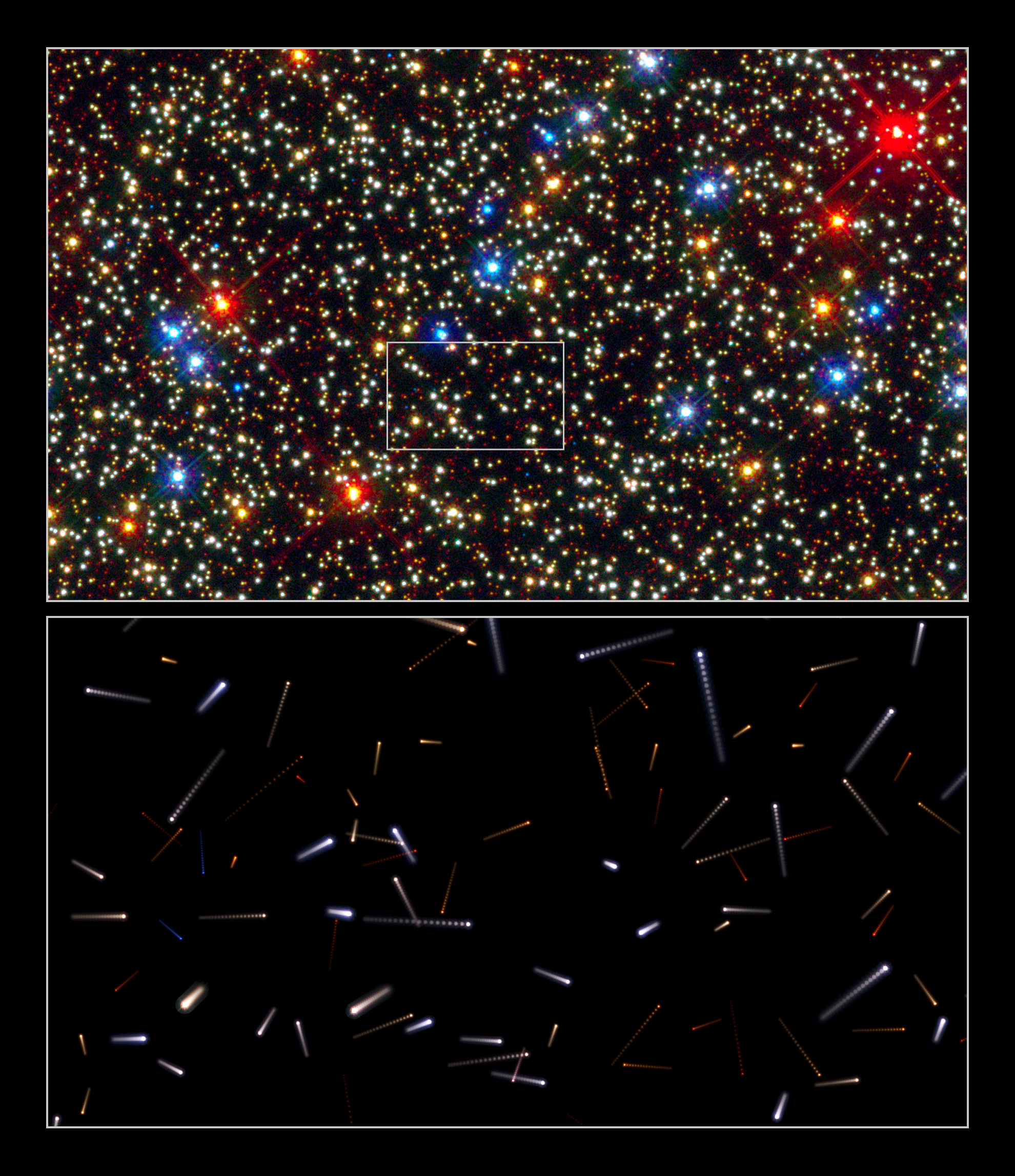
The central region of Omega Centauri. The lower illustration charts the future positions of the stars highlighted by the white box in the top image. Each streak represents the star's predicted motion over the next 600 years. The period between dots corresponds to 30 years. October 2010

A 2008 study presented evidence for an intermediate-mass black hole at the center of Omega Centauri, based on observations made by the Hubble Space Telescope and Gemini Observatory on Cerro Pachón in Chile. Hubble's Advanced Camera for Surveys showed that stars are bunching up near the center of Omega Centauri, as evidenced by the gradual increase in starlight near the center. Using instruments at the Gemini Observatory to measure the speed of stars swirling in the cluster's core, E. Noyola and colleagues found that stars closer to the core are moving faster than stars farther away. This measurement was interpreted to mean that unseen matter at the core is interacting gravitationally with nearby stars. By comparing these results with standard models, the astronomers concluded that the most likely cause was the gravitational pull of a dense, massive object such as a black hole. They calculated the object's mass at 40,000 solar masses.

More recent work has challenged conclusions that there is a black hole in the cluster's core, in particular disputing the proposed location of the cluster center. Calculations using a revised location for the center found that the velocity of core stars does not vary with distance, as would be expected if an intermediate-mass black hole were present. The same studies also found that starlight does not increase toward the center but instead remains relatively constant. The authors noted that their results do not entirely rule out the black hole proposed by Noyola and colleagues, but they do not confirm it, and they limit its maximum mass to 12,000 solar masses.

A study from July 10, 2024 has examined seven fast-moving stars from the center of Omega Centauri and found that their speeds were consistent with an intermediate-mass black hole of at least 8,200 solar masses, but this conclusion was again questioned in a later study.

=== Disrupted dwarf galaxy ===
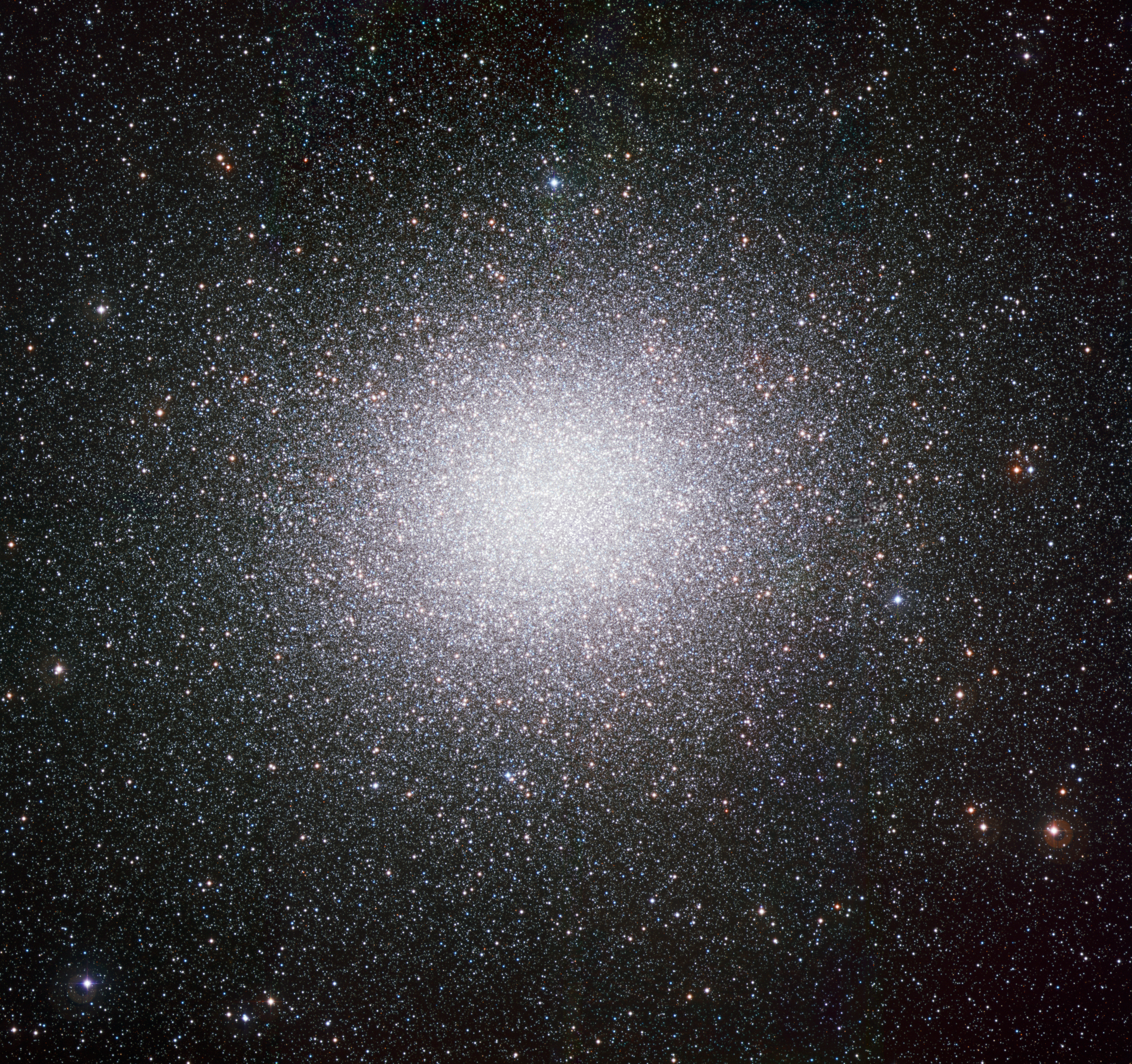
Captured with the WFI camera from ESO's La Silla Observatory

It has been speculated that Omega Centauri is the core of a dwarf galaxy that was disrupted and absorbed by the Milky Way. Indeed, Kapteyn's Star, which is currently only 13 light-years away from Earth, is thought to originate from Omega Centauri. Omega Centauri's chemistry and motion in the Milky Way are also consistent with this picture. Like Mayall II, Omega Centauri has a range of metallicities and stellar ages that suggests that it did not all form at once (as globular clusters are thought to form) and may in fact be the remainder of the core of a smaller galaxy long since incorporated into the Milky Way.

== In fiction ==
The novel Singularity (2012), by Ian Douglas, presents as fact that Omega Centauri and Kapteyn's Star originate from a disrupted dwarf galaxy, and this origin is central to the novel's plot. A number of scientific aspects of Omega Centauri are discussed as the story progresses, including the likely radiation environment inside the cluster and what the sky might look like from inside the cluster.

The character Atlan has adventures in Omega Centauri in cycle 7 of the Atlan series, a spinoff of the German science fiction series Perry Rhodan.

== See also ==
- Canis Major Overdensity
- Fimbulthul stream
- Mayall II
- Messier 54
- NGC 5286
- Sagittarius Dwarf Spheroidal Galaxy
- List of largest known star clusters
