= List of nearest galaxies =

Galaxies within 3.8 megaparsecs of the Solar System

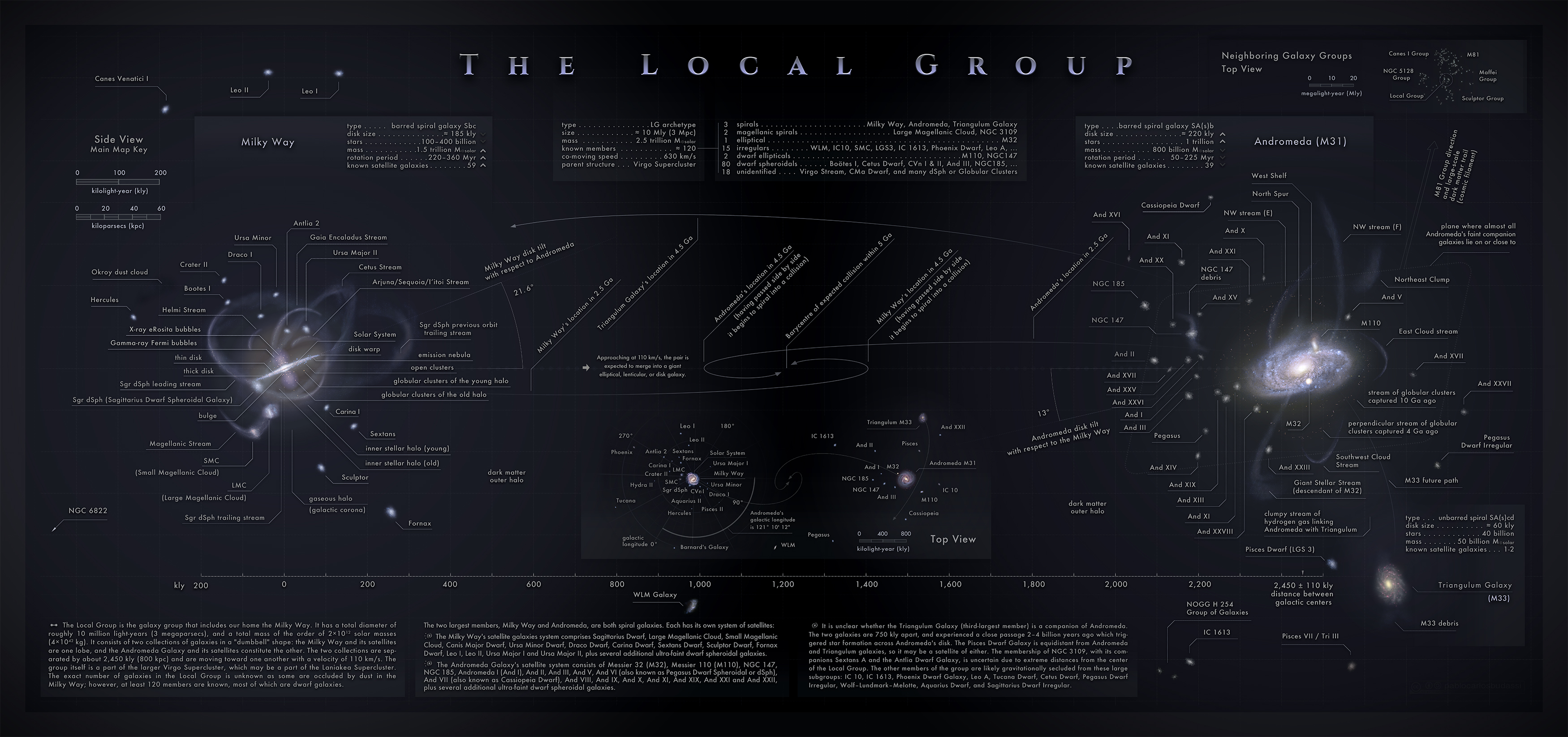
Diagram of the nearby local group of galaxies including the Milky Way, the Magellanic Clouds, Andromeda, dwarf galaxies, globular cluster, and stellar streams.

This is a list of known galaxies within 3.8 megaparsecs (12.4 million light-years) of the Solar System, in ascending order of heliocentric distance, or the distance to the Sun.

This encompasses about 50 major Local Group galaxies, and some that are members of neighboring galaxy groups, the M81 Group and the Centaurus A/M83 Group, and some that are currently not in any defined galaxy group.

The list aims to reflect current knowledge: not all galaxies within the 3.8 Mpc radius have been discovered. Nearby dwarf galaxies are still being discovered, and galaxies located behind the central plane of the Milky Way are extremely difficult to discern. It is possible for any galaxy to mask another located beyond it. Intergalactic distance measurements are subject to large uncertainties. Figures listed are composites of many measurements, some of which may have had their individual error bars tightened to the point of no longer overlapping with each other.

== List ==
#	Picture	Galaxy	Type	Distance (Note: Distances are measured from Earth. Dwarf satellite galaxies' distances to the plane or center of the Milky Way may be higher or lower.) (Mly)	Distance (Mpc)	Absolute magnitude	Apparent magnitude	Group membership	Notes	Diameter (ly)
-		Milky Way	Barred spiral galaxy	0.0265 (to the galactic center)	0.008	−20.8	n/a	Local Group	Home galaxy of Earth. Barred spiral galaxy.	87,400
1		Ursa Major III	Dwarf spheroidal galaxy or Star Cluster	0.033	0.010	+2.2	18.87 (Note: Calculated from the distance modulus ($m - M$) and the absolute magnitude ($M_{V}$))	Local Group	Satellite of Milky Way; status as galaxy or star cluster under study	20
2		Draco II	dSph	0.0701	0.0215	−0.8	15.87	Local Group	Satellite of Milky Way	120
3		Tucana III	dSph	0.0747	0.0229	−1.3	15.5	Local Group	Satellite of Milky Way that is being tidally disrupted	220
4		Segue 1	dSph	0.075	0.023	−3.0	13.8	Local Group	Satellite of Milky Way	
5		Sagittarius Dwarf Sphr SagDEG	dSph/E7	0.078	0.024	−12.67	4.5	Local Group	Satellite of Milky Way (partial accretion by Milky Way)	10,000
6		Hydrus I	0.09128	0.09	0.0276	−4.71	12.49	Local Group	Satellite of Milky Way, possibly associated with the Magellanic Clouds	348
7		Carina III		0.0907	0.0278	−2.4	14.82	Local Group	Satellite of Milky Way	200
8		Ursa Major II Dwarf	dSph	0.098	0.030	−4.2	14.3	Local Group	Satellite of Milky Way (accretion by Milky Way)	~1,800
8		Triangulum II		0.098	0.030	−1.8	15.6	Local Group	Satellite of Milky Way (accretion by Milky Way)	
10		Reticulum II		0.102	0.0314	−3.1	14.4	Local Group	Satellite of Milky Way	378
11		Segue 2	dSph	0.114	0.035	−2.5		Local Group	Satellite of Milky Way, one of the smallest known galaxies	220
12		Carina II		0.122	0.0374	−4.5	13.36	Local Group	Satellite of Milky Way	590
13		Willman 1	dSph or Star Clus	0.124	0.038	−2.7		Local Group	Satellite of Milky Way	
14		Boötes II	dSph	0.137	0.042	−2.7		Local Group	Satellite of Milky Way	
14		Coma Berenices Dwarf	dSph	0.137	0.042	−3.6		Local Group	Satellite of Milky Way	
16		Pictor II		0.147	0.045	−3.2	15.1	Local Group	Satellite of Milky Way possibly associated with the Large Magellanic Cloud	300
17		Boötes III	dSph	0.150	0.046	−5.8		Local Group	Satellite of Milky Way	
18		Tucana IV		0.157	0.048	−3.5	14.9	Local Group	Satellite of Milky Way	
19		Large Magellanic Cloud (LMC)	SB(s)m	0.163	0.050	−17.93	0.9	Local Group	Satellite of Milky Way	32,200
20		Grus II		0.179	0.055	−3.9		Local Group	Satellite of Milky Way	607
21		Tucana II		0.186	0.057	−3.8	15.0	Local Group	Satellite of Milky Way	1080
22		Boötes I	dSph	0.197	0.060	−5.8	13.1	Local Group	Satellite of Milky Way	
23		Small Magellanic Cloud (SMC, NGC 292)	SB(s)m pec	0.205	0.063	−16.35	2.7	Local Group	Satellite of Milky Way	18,900
23		Ursa Minor Dwarf	dE4	0.205	0.063	−7.13	11.9	Local Group	Satellite of Milky Way	
24		Virgo II		0.235	0.072	−1.6	17.7	Local Group	Satellite of Milky Way	
25		Eridanus IV		0.250	0.0767	−4.7	14.72	Local Group	Satellite of Milky Way	489
26		Horologium II		0.254	0.078	−2.6	16.9	Local Group	Satellite of Milky Way	287
27		Draco Dwarf (DDO 208)	dE0 pec	0.258	0.079	−8.74	10.9	Local Group	Satellite of Milky Way with a large amount of dark matter	~2,700 × 1,900
27		Horologium I		0.258	0.079	-3.4		Local Group	Satellite of Milky Way	196
29		Pisces Overdensity	dIrr/dSph	0.26	0.08	−10.35		Local Group	Satellite of Milky Way	
29		Leo Minor I		0.267	0.082	−2.4	17.16	Local Group	Satellite of Milky Way	
29		Aquarius III		0.277	0.085	−2.5		Local Group	Satellite of the Milky Way	330
30		Sextans Dwarf Sph	dSph	0.280	0.086	−7.98	12	Local Group	Satellite of Milky Way	8,400
31		Sculptor Dwarf (ESO 351-G30)	dE3	0.287	0.088	−9.77	10.1	Local Group	Satellite of Milky Way	
32		Pegasus IV		0.294	0.090	−4.25	15.52	Local Group	Satellite of Milky Way	
32		Virgo I		0.297	0.091	−0.3	19.5	Local Group	Satellite of Milky Way	
33		Reticulum III		0.300	0.092	−3.3	16.51	Local Group	Satellite of Milky Way	420
34		Ursa Major I Dwarf (UMa I dSph)	dSph	0.3157	0.0968	−6.75		Local Group	Satellite of Milky Way	~2,000
35		Phoenix II		0.326	0.100	−2.7		Local Group	Satellite of Milky Way	290
36		Carina Dwarf (ESO 206-G220)	dE3	0.33	0.10	−8.97	11.3	Local Group	Satellite of Milky Way	1,600
36		Boötes V		0.333	0.102	−3.2	16.84	Local Group	Satellite of Milky Way	
37		Aquarius II		0.3519	0.1079	−4.36	15.8	Local Group	Satellite of Milky Way	1,040
38		Aquarius IV		0.356	0.109	−1.9		Local Group	Satellite of Milky Way	
38		Leo VI		0.362	0.111	−3.56		Local Group	Satellite of Milky Way	910
38		Pictor I		0.372	0.114	−3.1	20.3	Local Group	Satellite of Milky Way	190
39		Crater II		0.383	0.1175	−8.2	12.2	Local Group	Satellite of Milky Way	
40		Grus I		0.391	0.120	−3.4	17.0	Local Group	Satellite of Milky Way	404
41		Sextans II		0.411	0.126	−3.9		Local Group	Satellite of Milky Way	
41		Antlia 2		0.430	0.1318	−9.86		Local Group	Satellite of Milky Way, most diffuse galaxy ever found	
42		Hercules Dwarf	dSph	0.434	0.133	−5.3	14.7	Local Group	Satellite of Milky Way	
43		Fornax Dwarf (ESO 356-G04)	dSph/E2	0.466	0.143	−11.5	9.28	Local Group	Satellite of Milky Way	
44		Canes Venatici II Dwarf	dSph	0.49	0.15	−4.8	15.1	Local Group	Satellite of Milky Way	
45		Hydra II	dSph	0.492	0.151	−5.1		Local Group	Satellite of Milky Way	500
45		Virgo III		0.492	0.151	−2.7		Local Group	Satellite of Milky Way	
46		Leo IV Dwarf	dSph	0.502	0.154	−5.5	15.9	Local Group	Satellite of Milky Way	
47		Leo V Dwarf	dSph	0.571	0.175	−5.2		Local Group	Satellite of Milky Way	
48		Pisces II	dG	0.597	0.183	−4.28	17.03	Local Group	Satellite of Milky Way	
48		Columba I		0.597	0.183	−4.2	17.11	Local Group	Satellite of Milky Way	760
50		Boötes IV		0.682	0.209	−4.53	17.07	Local Group	Satellite of Milky Way	3,000
51		Leo II Dwarf (Leo B, DDO 93)	dE0 pec	0.701	0.215	−9.23	12.45	Local Group	Satellite of Milky Way	4,100 (tidal)
51		Pegasus III		0.701	0.215	−4.17	17.50	Local Group	Satellite of Milky Way	350
53		Canes Venatici I Dwarf	dSph	0.711	0.218	−7.9	13.9	Local Group	Satellite of Milky Way	
54		Cetus III		0.819	0.251	−2.45	19.55	Local Group	Satellite of Milky Way	580
55		Leo I Dwarf (DDO 74, UGC 5470)	dE3	0.820	0.251	−10.97	11.18	Local Group	Satellite of Milky Way	
56		Eridanus II		1.19	0.366	−7.1		Local Group	Satellite of Milky Way	1,810
57		Leo T Dwarf	dIrr/dSph	1.35	0.413		16	Local Group	Satellite of Milky Way?	2,300
58		Leo K		1.42	0.434	−4.86		Local Group	Satellite of Milky Way	
58		Phoenix Dwarf Galaxy (P 6830)	IAm	1.44	0.44	−10.22	13.07	Local Group	Satellite of Milky Way	
58		Leo M		1.50	0.459	−5.77		Local Group	Satellite of Milky Way	
59		Pisces V (Andromeda XVI)	dSph	1.79	0.55 (Note: Calculated from the distance modulus ($m - M$) using the formula $d_{pc} = 10^{\frac{m - M}{5} + 1}$)	−7.6	16.1	Local Group	Satellite of Andromeda	985
60		Barnard's Galaxy (NGC 6822)	IB(s)m IV-V	1.859	0.570	−15.22	9.32	Local Group	It contains several large H II regions	7,000
61		NGC 185	dE3 pec	2.05	0.63	−14.76	9.99	Local Group	Satellite of Andromeda; possibly closest Seyfert galaxy to Earth	
62		Andromeda II	dE0	2.22	0.68	−12.6	11.7	Local Group	Satellite of Andromeda	6,820
63		Cassiopeia II (Andromeda XXX)	dSph	2.221	0.681	−8.0	16.0	Local Group	Satellite of Andromeda	1,800
64		IC 1613 (UGC 668)	IAB(s)m V	2.24	0.686	−14.51	9.92	Local Group		
65		Pegasus V (Andromeda XXXIV)		2.26	0.692	−6.3		Local Group	Satellite of Andromeda	
66		Leo A (Leo III, DDO 69)	IBm V	2.34	0.717	−11.68	12.92	Local Group	Satellite of Milky Way	
67		Andromeda XVII	dSph	2.371	0.727	−7.8	16.6	Local Group	Satellite of Andromeda	1,900
68		Andromeda XXV	dSph	2.401	0.736	−9.0	15.3	Local Group	Satellite of Andromeda	3,560
69		Andromeda XI	dSph	2.41	0.74	−7.3		Local Group	Satellite of Andromeda	
70		Andromeda XX	dSph	2.417	0.741	−6.4	18.0	Local Group	Satellite of Andromeda	590
71		Andromeda XXIII	dSph	2.440	0.748	−9.8	14.6	Local Group	Satellite of Andromeda	7,770
72		IC 10 (UGC 192)	dIrr IV/BCD	2.446	0.750	−15.57	12.2	Local Group	Satellite of Andromeda	
73		Andromeda III	dE2	2.45	0.75	−10.1	14.4	Local Group	Satellite of Andromeda	2750
73		Cassiopeia Dwarf (Cas dSph, Andromeda VII)	dSph	2.45	0.75	−11.67	13.65	Local Group	Satellite of Andromeda	
75		Andromeda XXVI	dSph	2.459	0.754	−5.8	18.5	Local Group	Satellite of Andromeda	980
76		Cetus Dwarf	dSph/E4	2.460	0.754	−10.18	14.4	Local Group	Satellite of Andromeda	
77		Pisces III (Andromeda XIII)	dSph	2.479	0.760	−6.5	17.8	Local Group	Satellite of Andromeda	850
78		Andromeda XV	dSph	2.48	0.76	−8.4	16.0	Local Group	Satellite of Andromeda	1840
79		M32 (NGC 221)	E2	2.489	0.763	−15.96	8.73	Local Group	Close Satellite of Andromeda	6,500
80		Andromeda IX	dE	2.500	0.767	−7.5		Local Group	Satellite of Andromeda	
81		Pisces Dwarf (LGS 3)	dIrr/dSph	2.510	0.770	−7.96	16.18	Local Group	Satellite of Triangulum	
82		Cassiopeia III (Andromeda XXXII)		2.518	0.772	−12.3	12.15	Local Group	Satellite of Andromeda	9,500
83		Andromeda V	dSph	2.52	0.773	−8.41	16.67	Local Group	Satellite of Andromeda	
84		Lacerta I (Andromeda XXXI)	dSph	2.521	0.773	−11.4	13.04	Local Group	Satellite of Andromeda	4,750
85		NGC 147 (DDO 3)	dE5 pec	2.53	0.776	−14.9	10.36	Local Group	Satellite of Andromeda	
86		Andromeda Galaxy (M31)	SA(s)b	2.538	0.778	−21.58	4.17	Local Group	Largest Galaxy in the Local Group (The Milky Way is the second largest), with at least 19 satellite galaxies. Barred spiral galaxy.	152,000
87		Pegasus Dwarf Spheroidal (Andromeda VI)	dSph	2.55	0.78	−10.80	14.05	Local Group	Satellite of Andromeda	
88		Perseus I (Andromeda XXXIII)		2.560	0.785	−10.3	14.19	Local Group	Satellite of Andromeda	2,600
89		Andromeda XIV (Pisces IV)		2.586	0.793	−8.5	15.8	Local Group	Satellite of Andromeda	~1,700
90		Andromeda I	dE3 pec	2.61	0.80	−12.0	12.7	Local Group	Satellite of Andromeda	5,840
91		Andromeda XXVIII	dSph	2.645	0.811	−8.7	15.85	Local Group	Satellite of Andromeda	1,800
92		M110 (NGC 205)	E6p	2.67	0.82	−16.15	8.72	Local Group	Close Satellite of Andromeda	
93		Andromeda VIII	dSph	2.700	0.828	−15.6	9.1	Local Group	Tidally distorted dwarf close to Andromeda discovered 2003	
94		Andromeda XXIX		2.704	0.829	−8.5	16.09	Local Group	Satellite of Andromeda	2,050
95		Triangulum Galaxy (M33)	SA(s)cd	2.73	0.84	−18.87	6.19	Local Group	Most distant (difficult) naked eye object. Closest unbarred spiral galaxy to us and third largest galaxy in the Local Group.	61,100
96		Andromeda XXI	dSph	2.802	0.859	−9.9		Local Group	Satellite of Andromeda	
97		Tucana Dwarf	dE5	2.87	0.88	−9.16	15.7	Local Group	Isolated group member — a 'primordial' galaxy	
98		Andromeda X	dSph	2.90	0.889	−8.1	16.1	Local Group	Satellite of Andromeda discovered 2006	
99		Andromeda XXIV	dSph	2.929	0.898	−8.4	16.3	Local Group	Satellite of Andromeda	4,440
99		Pegasus Dwarf Irregular (DDO 216)	dIrr/dSph	2.929	0.898	−11.47	13.21	Local Group	Satellite of Andromeda	
101		Pisces VII (Triangulum III)		2.99	0.916	−6.0		Local Group	Likely satellite of Triangulum	
102	False-color image of Andromeda XXXV.	Andromeda XXXV		3.023	0.927	−5.2		Local Group	Satellite of Andromeda	350
102		Andromeda XII	dSph	3.027	0.928	−7.0	17.7	Local Group	Satellite of Andromeda	2,740
103		Wolf-Lundmark-Melotte (WLM, DDO 221)	IB(s)m	3.043	0.933	−14.06	11.03	Local Group	Isolated member at the edge of the local group	11,500
103		Andromeda XIX	dSph	3.043	0.933	−9.3		Local Group	Satellite of Andromeda, spread over 1.7 kpc	2,200
105		Andromeda XXII	dSph	3.219	0.987		18.0	Local Group	Satellite of Andromeda	
106		Aquarius Dwarf Galaxy (DDO 210)	Im V	3.22	0.988	−11.09	14.0	Local Group	Isolated group member	
107		Sagittarius Dwarf Irregular Galaxy (SagDIG)	IB(s)m V	3.907	1.198	−11.49	15.5	Local Group	Isolated, star forming group member	3,000
108		UGC 4879 (VV124)	IAm	3.956	1.213	−11.5	13.2	Local Group	Isolated, star forming group member	3,000
109		Andromeda XVIII	dSph	3.960	1.214	−9.2	16.2	Local Group	1,700	≈ 1,200
110		Antlia Dwarf	dE3.5	4.28	1.31	−9.63	16.19	Local Group (Note: Galaxies of small Antlia-Sextans Group, which is considered as part of Local Group, but membership of it is uncertain.)	May have interacted with NGC 3109	3,000
111		Sextans A (UGCA 205, DDO 75)	IBm	4.31	1.32	−13.95	11.86	Local Group	Contains cluster of young hot blue stars	5,000
112		NGC 3109	SB(s)m	4.338	1.35	−15.68	10.39	Local Group	Possibly spiral galaxy	25,000
113		Antlia B	dSph/Irr	4.40	1.35	−9.7	15.95	Local Group	Satellite of NGC 3109	1,780
114		Sculptor A		4.40	1.35	−6.9		Local Group		
114		Sextans B (UGC 5373)	IM IV-V	4.47	1.37	−14.08	11.85	Local Group	One of the smallest galaxies with planetary nebulae	6,000
114		Tucana B	dSph	4.56	1.4	−6.9	18.85	Local Group	Isolated group member	522
115		Cassiopeia 1	Irr	5.19	1.59	-14.2	14.62	Isolated	Isolated galaxy	
116		Leo P	Irr	5.28	1.62	-9.27	16.89	Local Group	Extremely low metallicity	3,690
117		IC 5152	IA(s)m	5.68	1.74	−15.56	11.06	Local Group ?	Possible outlying member of Local Group	4,000
118		NGC 300	SA(s)d	6.07	1.86	−17.92	8.95	between LG and Sculptor Group	Closest spiral galaxy to Local Group forms pair with NGC 55	94,000
119		KKR 25	Irr	6.20	1.90	−9.94	17.0	between LG and M81		
120		ESO 410-G005	E3	6.213	1.905	−11.60	14.85	NGC 55 & 300		≈ 2,500
121		ESO 294-010	dS0/Im	6.36	1.96	−10.95	15.6	NGC 55 & 300		
122		Pavo		6.49	1.99	−10.0				
122		NGC 55	SB(s)m	6.52	2.00	−18.47	8.84	between LG and Sculptor Group	Forms pair with NGC 300	70,000
123		Sculptor C		6.65	2.04	−9.1			Satellite of NGC 300	
123		KKs 3	dSph	6.91	2.12	−12.3	14.47			4,900
124		KKR 03 (KK 230)	dIrr	6.98	2.14	−9.8	17.90	Inner edge of M94 Group		980
125		UGCA 438 (ESO 407-018)	IB(s)m pec:	7.24	2.22	−12.92	13.86	NGC 55 & 300		
126		KK 258 (ESO 468–20)	dTr	7.27	2.23	−10.3		NGC 55 & 300		
127		UGC 9128 (DDO 187)	ImIV-V	7.31	2.24	−12.47	14.38	Inner edge of M94 Group		
128		IC 3104	IB(s)m	7.40	2.27	−14.85	13.63		On the way to Circinus galaxy	
129		Dw1907+63		7.8	2.4		17.0			
129		GR 8 (DDO 155, UGC 8091)	ImV	7.8	2.4	−12.14	14.65	Inner edge of M94 Group	"footprint galaxy"	
129		Hedgehog Galaxy		7.86	2.41	−9.84 (V), −9.56 (g)	17.5 (NUV), 19.00 (FUV)		Isolated dwarf	
130		IC 4662 (ESO 102-14)	IBm	7.96	2.44	−15.56	11.74		On the way to Circinus galaxy	7,000
131		KKH 98	Irr	7.99	2.45	−10.78	16.7	IC 342/Maffei Group		
131		Sculptor B		8.09	2.48	−8.1				
131		SMDG 0956+82		8.48	2.6		18.1			
132		UGC 8508 (I Zw 060)	IAm	8.35	2.69	−13.09	14.40	M94 Group		
133		KKH 86	Irr	8.48	2.60	−10.30	16.8		Isolated (M94/Cent A)	
134		DDO 99 (UGC 6817)	Im	8.61	2.64–3.9	−13.52	13.4	M94 Group		
135		Dw1245+61		8.81	2.7		18.4			
135		ESO 6-1	Ir	8.81	2.70	−12.41	14.75		Blue compact dwarf galaxy	
136		UGC 7577 (DDO 125)	Im	8.94	2.74	−14.32	12.84	M94 Group		
137		KDG 162		9.13	2.8		17.3			
137		Dwingeloo 1	SB(s)cd	9.13	2.8	−18.78	19.8	IC 342/Maffei Group		35,000
138		UGC 9240 (DDO 190)	IAm	9.13	2.80	−14.19	13.25	M94 Group		15,000
139		NGC 4190	Irr (BCD)	9.19	2.82		13.50		Satellite of NGC 4214	
140		Dw1645+46		11.09	2.9		17.6			
140		KKs 53 (Cen 7)	dSph	9.56	2.93	−10.86	17.30	Centaurus A/M83 Group		
141		NGC 4214 (UGC 7278)	IAB(s)m	9.59	2.94		10.24	M94 Group	Starburst galaxy	
142		UGCA 276 (DDO 113)	Im	9.62	2.95		15.40	M94 Group		
143		UGCA 133 (DDO 44)	Im	9.65	2.96	−12.9	15.54	M81 Group	Likely satellite of NGC 2403	
143		NGC 4163 (NGC 4167)	dIrr	9.65	2.96		14.5	M94 Group		4,000
144		UGCA 86	SAB(s)m	9.72	2.98		13.5	IC 342/Maffei Group	Satellite of IC 342	20,000
145		NGC 1560	SA(s)d HII	9.75	2.99	−16.87	12.16	IC 342/Maffei Group	Satellite of IC 342	
146		MADCASH-2 (MADCASH J121007+352635-dw)	dSph	9.78	3.00	−9.15	18.24	M94 Group	Likely satellite of NGC 4214	
147		Dwingeloo 2	Im?	9.8	3.0	−14.55	20.5	IC 342/Maffei Group		20,000
147		KKH 11 (ZOAG G135.74-04.53)	dE/N	9.8	3.0	−13.35	16.2	IC 342/Maffei Group		
147		KKH 12	Irr	9.8	3.0	−13.03	17.8	IC 342/Maffei Group		
147		MB 3	dSph	9.8	3.0	−13.65	19.8	IC 342/Maffei Group		10,000
147		MB 1 (KK 21)	SAB(s)d?	9.8	3.0	−14.81	20.5	IC 342/Maffei Group		5,000
147		Maffei 1	S0- pec	9.8	3.0	−18.97	11.4	IC 342/Maffei Group		55,000
153		Maffei 2	SAB(rs)bc	9.801	3.005	−20.15	14.77	IC 342/Maffei Group		60,000
154		UGC 8651 (DDO 181)	Im	9.82	3.01		14.7	M94 Group		
155		Donatiello I	dSph	9.88	3.04				Possible satellite of NGC 404	
156		NGC 2403	SAB(s)cd HII	9.92	3.04	−19.29	8.93	Inner edge of M81 Group		50,000
156		KK 153		9.98	3.06	−10.87				
157		NGC 404	SA(s)0-:	10.05	3.08	−16.61	11.21		'Mirach's Ghost'	
158		ESO 274-01	SAd:	10.1	3.09		11.7	Centaurus A/M83 Group		
159		Dw1558+67		10.1	3.1		16.8			
159		GALFA-Dw4	dIrr	10.1	3.10	−11.8	15.7		Isolated	
160		KKH 22	dSph	10.17	3.12	–12.19	15.28	IC 342/Maffei Group	Satellite of IC 342	
161		NGC 3741	ImIII/BCD	10.21	3.13		14.3	M94 Group		
162		KK 35	Irr	10.31	3.16	−14.30	17.2	IC 342/Maffei Group	Satellite of IC 342	
162		HIPASS J1247-77	Im	10.31	3.16		17.B		Aligned with IC 3104	
164		NGC 2366	IB(s)m	10.40	3.19		11.43	M81 Group		
164		NGC 1569 (UGC 3056)	IBm;Sbrst	10.40	3.19	−18.17	11.86	IC 342/Maffei Group	Satellite of IC 342	6,000
164		ESO 321-014	IBm	10.40	3.19		15.16	Centaurus A/M83 Group		
167		UGC 8833	Im	10.41	3.19		16.5	M94 Group		
168		Sculptor dIG (ESO 349–31)	dIrr	10.44	3.2	−11.87	15.5	Sculptor Group	Satellite of NGC 7793	
169		UGC 4483	dIrr	10.47	3.21		15.2	M81 Group		
169		dw0910+7326 ("Blobby")	dSph	10.47	3.21	-11.57	15.96	M81 Group		
170		UGC 8760 (DDO 183)	I	10.50	3.22	−13.08	14.78			
170		UGCA 92	Im?	10.50	3.22		13	IC 342/Maffei Group	Satellite of IC 342	
171		IC 342	SAB(rs)cd	10.70	3.28	−20.69	9.37	IC 342/Maffei Group	"the hidden galaxy"	75,000
173		UGCA 15 (DDO 6)	IB(s)m	10.90	3.34	−12.50	15.19	Sculptor Group		
174		KKs 58	dSph	10.96	3.36	−11.93		Centaurus A/M83 Group		
		Donatiello III	dSph	10.98	3.37	−8.91		Sculptor Group		
175		KKH 37 (Mai 16)	S/Irr	11.06	3.39		16.4	IC 342/Maffei Group		
175		UGCA 105	Im?	11.06	3.39	−16.81	13.9	IC 342/Maffei Group	Satellite of IC 342	
175		Holmberg II (DDO 50, UGC 4305)	Im	11.06	3.39		11.1	M81 Group		
175		Dw1559+46		11.09	3.4		17.1			
175		NGC 5102	SA0- HII	11.09	3.40	−18.0856	10.35	Centaurus A/M83 Group		
175		NGC 5237	I0?	11.09	3.40		13.23	Centaurus A/M83 Group		
175		ESO 325-11		11.09	3.40		13.99	Centaurus A/M83 Group		
175		ESO 540-030 (KDG 2)	IABm	11.09	3.40	−11.39	16.45	Sculptor Group		
182		NGC 247	SAB(s)d	11.1	3.4	−20.00	9.9	Sculptor Group		
183		MADCASH-1 (MADCASH J074238+652501-dw)	dSph	11.12	3.41	−7.81	19.85	M81 Group	Likely satellite of NGC 2403	
184		F6D1 (FM 1, PGC 3097828)	dSph	11.15	3.42		17.5	M81 Group		
184		ESO 540-032	IAB(s)m pec:	11.15	3.42	−11.32	16.55	Sculptor Group		
186		ESO 383-087 (ISG 39)	SB(s)dm	11.25	3.45	−15.16	11.03	Centaurus A/M83 Group		
187		NGC 5206	SB0	11.32	3.47			Centaurus A/M83 Group		
188		KK 179 (ESO 269-37)	IABm:	11.4	3.48			Centaurus A/M83 Group		
188		Corvus A		11.4	3.48	−11.2				
193		Donatiello II (Scl-MM-dw3)	UFD	11.35	3.48	−7.24		Sculptor Group		
189		Sculptor Galaxy (NGC 253)	SAB(s)c	11.40	3.49		8.0	Sculptor Group		90,000
190		DDO 71 (UGC 5428)	Im	11.42	3.50		18	M81 Group		
191		Camelopardalis B	Irr	11.46	3.50	−11.85	16.1	IC 342/Maffei Group	Satellite of IC 342	
192		Messier 82	I0;Sbrst HII	11.42	3.53	−19.63	9.30	M81 Group		37,000, possibly up to 100,000
193		NGC 5253	Im pec	11.51	3.53		10.9	Centaurus A/M83 Group	Nearest Wolf-Rayet galaxy to us.	
193		Scl-MM-dw1		11.51	3.53	−8.75		Sculptor Group		
193		Scl-MM-dw2		11.51	3.53	−12.10		Sculptor Group		
194		M81 Dwarf A (KDG 52)	I?	11.58	3.55	−11.49	16.5	M81 Group		
194		KK 77 (F12D1)	dSph	11.58	3.55		16.2	M81 Group		
196		NGC 2976	SAc pec HII	11.61	3.56	−17.1	10.82	M81 Group		
196		Camelopardalis A		11.61	3.56			IC 342/Maffei Group	Satellite of IC 342	
198		KK 211 (AM 1339–445)	dSph	11.68	3.58	−11.93	16.32	Centaurus A/M83 Group	Satellite of NGC 5128	
198		PGC 51659 (UKS 1424–460)	IBm	11.68	3.58	−11.83	16.50	Centaurus A/M83 Group		
198		KDG 61	dE/dSph	11.68	3.58	−12.84	14.93	M81 Group		
201		NGC 4945	SB(s)cd:sp	11.70	3.59	−20.51	9.3	Centaurus A/M83 Group		
202		NGC 6789	Im	11.74	3.6	−14.32	13.76		In the Local Void	
202		Messier 81	SA(s)ab, LINER	11.74	3.6		6.94	M81 Group	Brightest galaxy in M81 Group	90,000
202		UGC 6451		11.74	3.6		15.4			
204		Holmberg IX (UGC 5336, DDO 66)	Irr	11.77	3.61		14.53	M81 Group	Contains ultraluminous X-ray source (ULX) Holmberg IX X-1	
204		UGCA 292 (CVn I dwA)	ImIV-V	11.77	3.61		16.0	M94 Group		
		NGC253-SNFC-dw1	dsph	11.80	3.62	−11.7		Sculptor Group		
206		BK 5N	dSph	11.84	3.63		17.49	M81 Group		
207		DDO 78 (KK 89)	dSph	11.94	3.66		16.50	M81 Group		
207		F8D1	dSph	11.94	3.66	−12.20	15.70	M81 Group		
209		UGC 4459 (DDO 53)	Im	12.00	3.68	−13.37	14.48	M81 Group		
210		Centaurus A (NGC 5128)	S0 pec	12.01	3.68		6.84	Centaurus A/M83 Group	Brightest galaxy in Centaurus A Group and brightest and nearest radio galaxy	60,000
211		KDG 64 (UGC 5442)	dE/dSph	12.07	3.70	−12.55	15.29	M81 Group		
212		IKN	dE	12.23	3.75	−14.29		M81 Group		
212		KKs 54	dSph	12.23	3.75	−10.41		Centaurus A/M83 Group		
		dw0036m2828	dSph	12.25	3.76	−8.75		Sculptor Group		
213		NGC 5011C (ESO 269–68)	dE/Im	12.3	3.77	−14.74	13.47	Centaurus A/M83 Group		
213		Centaurus N		12.3	3.77	−11.15		Centaurus A/M83 Group		
213		KK 213	dSph	12.3	3.77		18.00	Centaurus A/M83 Group		
213		KK 203	dSph	12.30	3.77	−11.7		Centaurus A/M83 Group	In Centaurus A Group; contains a ring of Hα emission	
		Donatiello IV	dSph	12.80	3.94	−8.61		Sculptor Group		

== See also ==
- Lists of astronomical objects
- List of galaxies
- List of nearest stars and brown dwarfs
- List of spiral galaxies
- Canis Major Overdensity – disputed dwarf irregular galaxy 25,000 light-years away (closer than Milky Way center)
