= Satellite galaxies of the Milky Way =

Galaxies bound to the Milky Way

The Milky Way has several smaller galaxies gravitationally bound to it, as part of the Milky Way subgroup, which is part of the local galaxy cluster, the Local Group.

There are 61 small galaxies confirmed to be within 420 kiloparsecs (1.4 million light-years) of the Milky Way, but not all of them are necessarily in orbit, and some may themselves be in orbit of other satellite galaxies. The only ones visible to the naked eye are the Large and Small Magellanic Clouds, which have been observed since prehistory. Measurements with the Hubble Space Telescope in 2006 suggest the Magellanic Clouds may be moving too fast to be orbiting the Milky Way. Of the galaxies confirmed to be in orbit, the largest is the Sagittarius Dwarf Spheroidal Galaxy, which has a diameter of 2.6 kiloparsecs (8,500 ly) or roughly a twentieth that of the Milky Way.

== Characteristics ==
Satellite galaxies that orbit from 1,000 ly (310 pc) of the edge of the disc of the Milky Way Galaxy to the edge of the dark matter halo of the Milky Way at 980,000 ly (300 kpc) from the center of the galaxy, (Note: The distance to edge of the dark matter halo of the galaxy from its center is the virial radius of a galaxy, R_{vir}) are generally depleted in hydrogen gas compared to those that orbit more distantly. This is because of their interactions with the dense hot gas halo of the Milky Way that strip cold gas from the satellites. Satellites beyond that region still retain copious quantities of gas.

== List ==
The Milky Way's satellite galaxies include the following:

Name	Diameter (kpc)	Distance (kpc)	Absolute visual magnitude	Type	Discovered
Large Magellanic Cloud	4	48.5	−18.1	SBm	prehistoric
Antlia 2	2.9	130	−8.5	Irr?	2018
Sagittarius Dwarf	2.6	20	−13.5	E	1994
Crater II	2.2	117.5	−8.2	dSph	2016
Small Magellanic Cloud	2	61	−16.8	Irr	prehistoric
Canes Venatici I	1.1	220	−8.6	dSph	2006
Canis Major Dwarf	1.5	8	−14.4	Irr	2003
Boötes III	1.0	46	−5.75	dSph?	2009
Sculptor Dwarf	0.8	90	−11.1	dE3	1937
Draco Dwarf	0.7	80	−8.8	dE0	1954
Hercules	0.7	135	−6.6	dSph	2006
Leo II	0.7	210	−9.8	dE0	1950
Fornax Dwarf	0.6	140	−13.4	dE2	1938
Eridanus II	0.55	366	−7.1	dSph	2015
Sextans Dwarf Spheroidal	0.5	90	−9.3	dE3	1990
Carina Dwarf Spheroidal	0.5	100	−9.1	dE3	1977
Leo I	0.5	250	−12.0	dE3	1950
Ursa Minor Dwarf	0.4	60	−8.8	dE4	1954
Leo T	0.34	420	−8.0	dSph/dIrr	2006
Aquarius II	0.32	108	−4.2	dSph	2016
Boötes I	0.30	60	−6.3	dSph	2006
Canes Venatici II	0.30	155	−4.9	dSph	2006
Leo IV	0.30	160	−5.8	dSph	2006
Tucana IV	0.25	48	−3.5	dSph	2015
Columba I	0.21	182	−4.5	dSph	2015
Ursa Major II Dwarf	0.20	30	−4.25	dG D	2006
Grus II	0.19	53	−3.9	dSph	2015
Cetus III	0.18	251	−2.4	dSph?	2017
Coma Berenices	0.14	42	−4.1	dG D	2006
Hydra II	0.14	128	−4.8	dSph	2015
Reticulum III	0.13	92	−3.3	dSph	2015
Pisces II	0.12	180	−5.0	Sph	2010
Pegasus III	0.11	215	−3.4	dSph	2015
Hydrus I	0.10	28	−4.7	dSph	2018
Boötes II	0.10	42	−2.7	dSph	2007
Tucana III	0.09	25	−2.4	dSph	2015
Virgo I	0.09	91	−0.3	dSph	2016
Horologium II	0.09	78	−2.6	dSph	2015
Sagittarius II	0.08	67	−5.2	dSph	2015
Leo V	0.08	180	−5.2	dSph	2007
Triangulum II	0.07	30	−1.8	dSph	2015
Segue 2	0.07	35	−2.5	dSph	2007
Segue 1	0.06	23	−1.5	dSph	2007
Draco II	0.04	20	−2.9	dSph	2015
Tucana V	0.03	55	−1.6	dSph	2015
Cetus II	0.03	30	0.0	dSph?	2015
Reticulum II	0.064	30	−3.6	dSph	2015
Tucana II	0.33	70	−3.9	dSph	2015
Pisces Overdensity	1.5	80	−13	dSph?	2009
DES 1	0.02	82	−3.05	dSph?	2016
Eridanus III	0.028	90	−2.4	dSph? (Note: May be a globular cluster instead)	2015
Horologium I	0.06	100	−3.5	dSph?	2015
Kim 2/Indus I	0.074	100	−3.5	GC/dSph	2015
Phoenix II	0.0521	100	−3.7	dSph?	2015
Ursa Major I Dwarf	0.64	100	−5.5	dG Sph	2005
Pictoris I	0.058	115	−3.7	dSph?	2015
Grus I	0.12	120	−3.4	dSph	2015
Pegasus IV	0.082	90	−4.25	dSph	2022
Carina II	0.182	36	−4.5	dSph	2018
Carina III	0.06	28	−2.4	GC?	2018
Boötes IV	0.28	209	−4.53	dSph	2019
Centaurus I	0.076	116	−5.55	dSph	2020
Pictor II	0.046	46	−3.2	dSph	2016
Boötes V	0.0194	102	−3.2	dSph?	2022
Leo Minor I	0.0897	82	−2.4	dSph	2022
Virgo II	0.07	72	−1.6	dSph	2022
Willman 1	0.02	38	−2.53	dSph	2018
Ursa Major III	0.003	10	+2.2	dSph?	2023
Leo K	0.0087	434	−4.86	dSph	2024
Leo M	0.009	459	−5.77	dSph	2024
Sextans II	0.024?	–	–	dSph	2024
Virgo III	0.015	154	–	dSph	2024
Pegasus W	0.01	227	+1	dSph	2020
Eridanus IV	0.034	59.7	+0.2	dSph?	2021
Laevens 1 (Crater 1)	0.09	26.8	+0.8	dG D	2014
Leo VI	0.28	111	−3.56	dSph	2024
Aquarius III	0.102	85	−2.5	dSph	2024
Aquarius IV	0.062	109	−1.9	dSph	2026

== Map with clickable regions ==
Milky Way's satellite galaxies (clickable map)

== Streams ==
The Sagittarius Dwarf Spheroidal Galaxy is currently in the process of being consumed by the Milky Way and is expected to pass through it within the next 100 million years. The Sagittarius Stream is a stream of stars in polar orbit around the Milky Way leeched from the Sagittarius Dwarf. The Virgo Stellar Stream is a stream of stars that is believed to have once been an orbiting dwarf galaxy that has been completely distended by the Milky Way's gravity.

== See also ==
- List of Andromeda's satellite galaxies
- List of nearest galaxies
- Local Group
