= Ursa Dwarf =

Ursa Dwarf may refer to:

- Ursa Minor Dwarf
- Ursa Major I Dwarf, a satellite of the Milky Way Galaxy, discovered in 2005
- Ursa Major II Dwarf, a satellite of the Milky Way Galaxy, discovered in 2006
- Palomar 4 star cluster, also called Ursa Major Dwarf
