= NGC 3545B =

Elliptical galaxy in the constellation Ursa Major

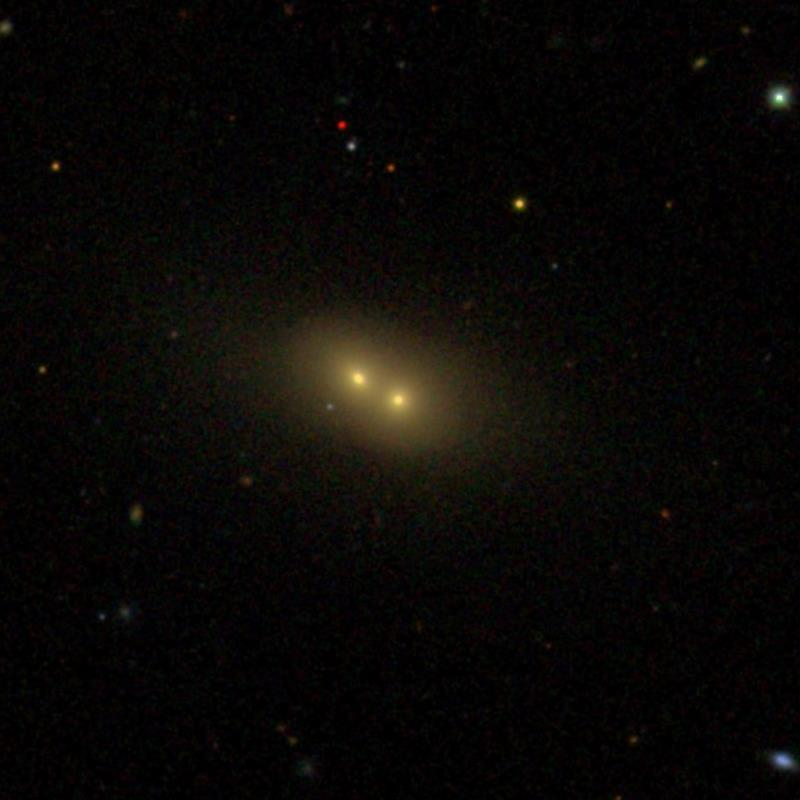
- SDSS image of NGC 3545B

Observation data (J2000 epoch)
- Constellation: Ursa Major
- Right ascension: 11^{h} 10^{m} 13.2^{s}
- Declination: +36° 58′ 00″
- Redshift: 8660 km/s
- Heliocentric radial velocity: 0.028887
- Apparent magnitude (B): 14.8

Characteristics
- Type: E
- Apparent size (V): 0.88′ × 0.56′

Other designations
- MCG +06-25-017, PGC 33893

NGC 3545B is an elliptical galaxy in the constellation Ursa Major. The object is close to NGC 3545.

== See also ==
- List of galaxies
- List of nearest galaxies
- List of NGC objects
