= NGC 3602 =

Galaxy in the constellation Leo

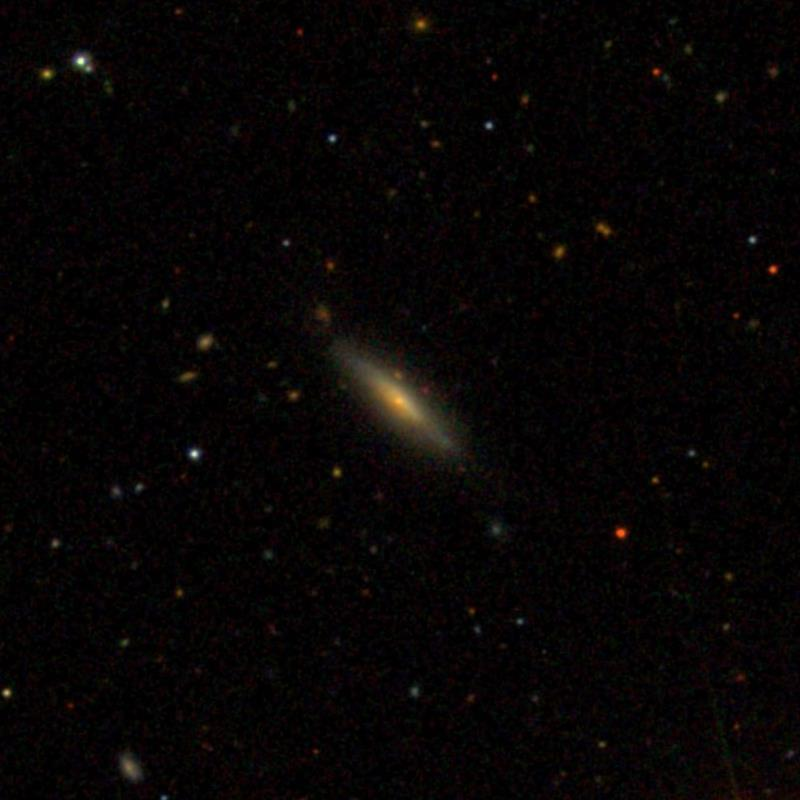
- SDSS image of NGC 3602

Observation data (J2000 epoch)
- Constellation: Leo
- Right ascension: 11^{h} 15^{m} 48.322^{s}
- Declination: +17° 24′ 58.03″
- Redshift: 0.02026
- Heliocentric radial velocity: 6012 ± 51 km/s
- Distance: 307.3 ± 21.6 Mly (94.23 ± 6.61 Mpc)
- Apparent magnitude (B): 15.63

Characteristics
- Type: SBa

Other designations
- MCG +03-29-017, PGC 34351

NGC 3602 is a barred spiral galaxy in the constellation Leo. It was discovered on March 4, 1865 by the astronomer Albert Marth.

== See also ==
- List of largest galaxies
- List of nearest galaxies
