= KKR 03 =

Galaxy in constellation Canes Venatici

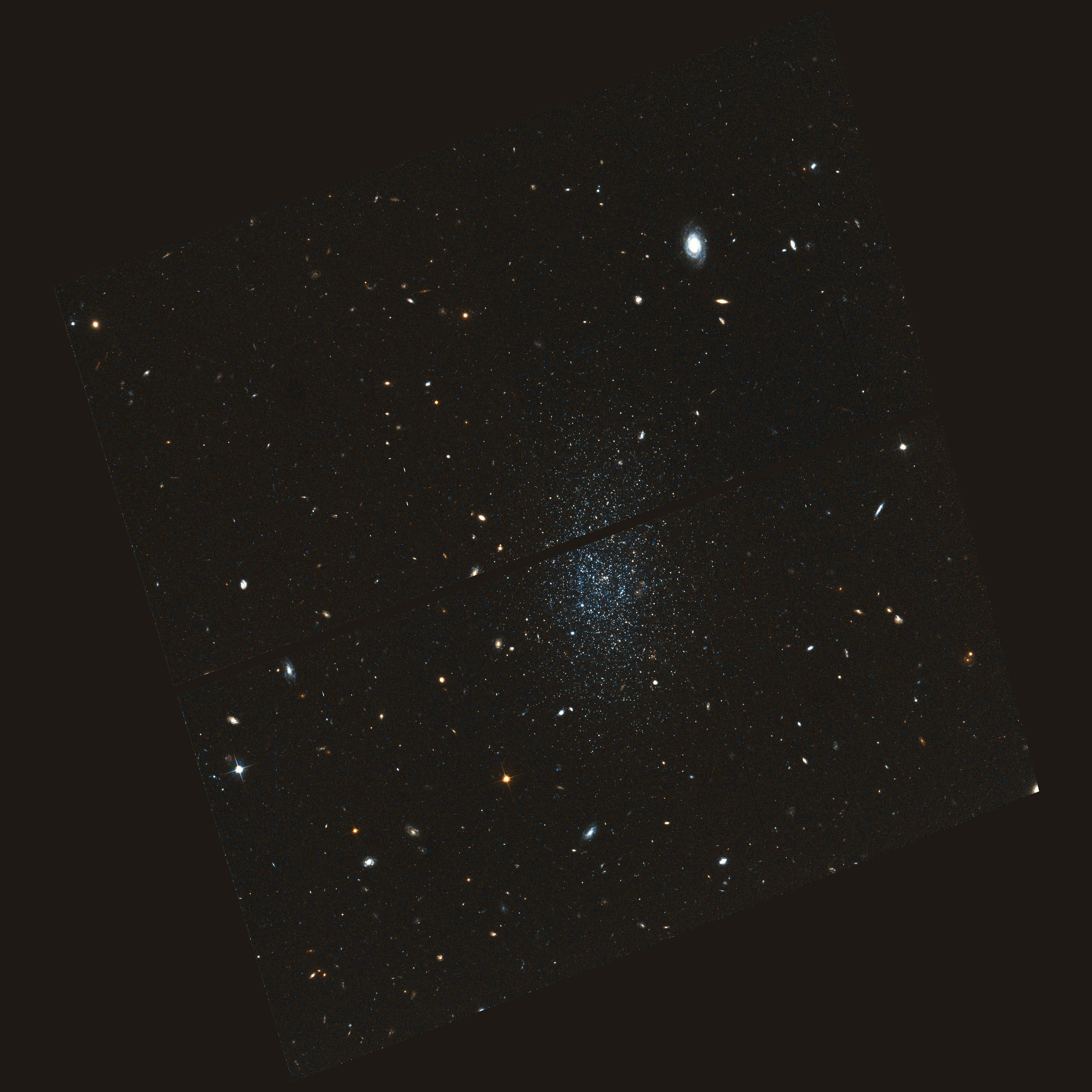

Observation data (J2000 epoch)
- Constellation: Canes Venatici
- Right ascension: 14^{h} 07^{m} 10.7^{s}
- Declination: +35° 03′ 37″
- Redshift: 0.000211
- Heliocentric radial velocity: 63.3 ± 1.8 km/s (39.3 ± 1.1 mi/s)
- Distance: 6.4 million ly (1.97 million pc)
- Apparent magnitude (V): 15.68
- Absolute magnitude (V): −10.85

Characteristics
- Type: dIrr
- Size: 980 ly (300 pc)

Other designations
- LEDA 166185, PGC 166185, [KK98a] 140501.5+351809, [KK98a] 230, [KKR99] 384.4, [KKR99] 3, 11HUGS 367, MAPS-NGP O_271_0183623

KKR 03 is a dwarf irregular galaxy located 6.4 million light-years (1.97 million parsecs) away from Earth. It has an absolute magnitude of −10.85 and lies on the inner edge of the M94 Group.

== See also ==
- List of nearest galaxies
