= NGC 1169 =

Intermediate barred spiral galaxy in the constellation Perseus

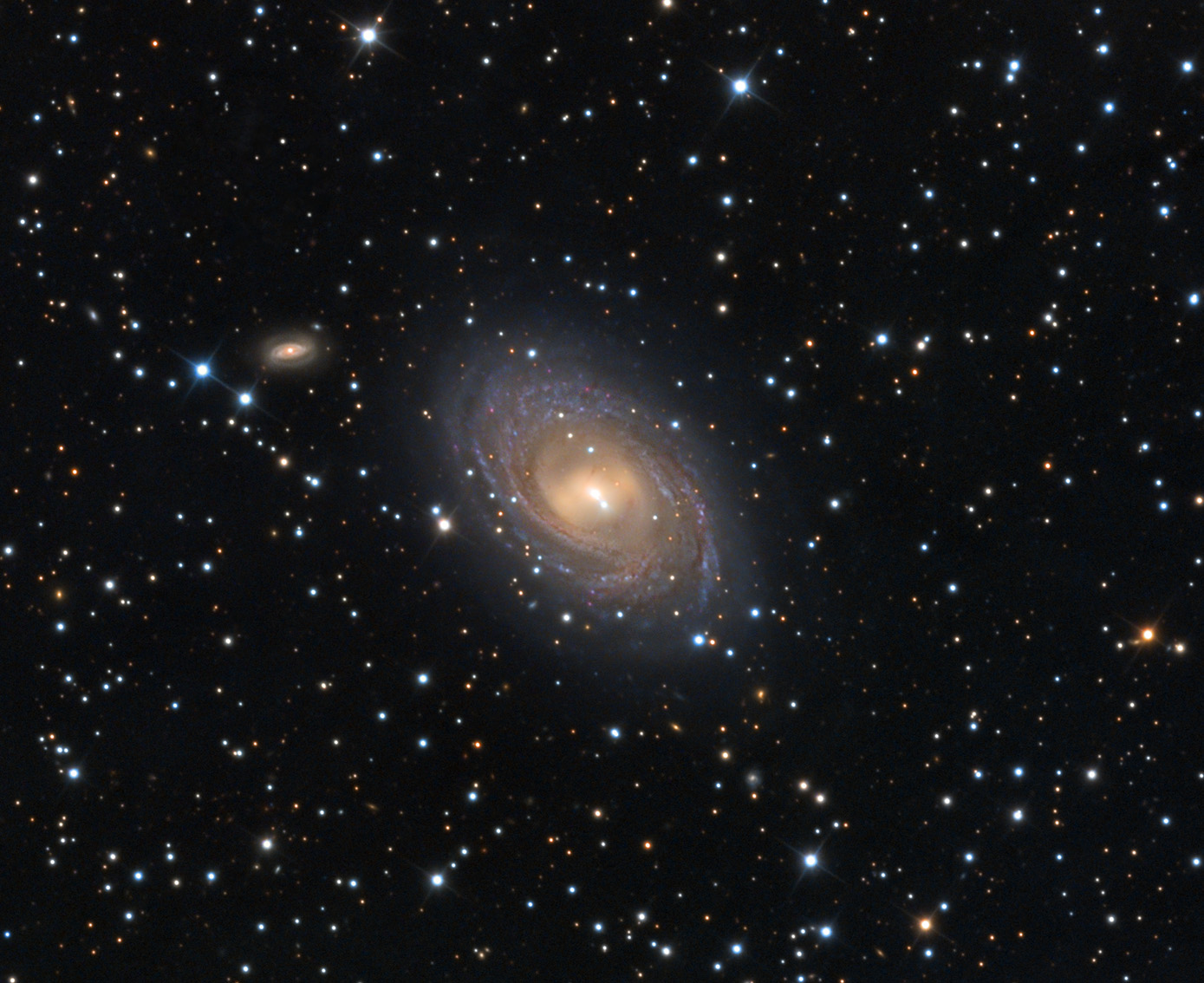
- Image of NGC 1169 taken by Adam Block

Observation data (J2000 epoch)
- Constellation: Perseus
- Right ascension: 03^{h} 03^{m} 34.756^{s}
- Declination: +46° 23′ 10.74″
- Redshift: 0.007962 ± 0.000017
- Heliocentric radial velocity: 2387 ± 5 km/s
- Galactocentric velocity: 2508 ± 5 km/s
- Distance: 35.1 ± 8.4 kpc (114 ± 27 kly)h^{−1}_{0.73}
- Apparent magnitude (V): 9.02
- Apparent magnitude (B): 13.2
- Absolute magnitude (V): -23.6

Characteristics
- Type: SAB(r)b
- Mass: 4.5×10^{11} M_{☉}
- Mass/Light ratio: 10 M_{☉}/L_{☉}
- Size: 120,000 × 84,000 ly
- Apparent size (V): 4.2 × 2.8 arcmin

Other designations
- NGC 1169, UGC 2503, PGC 11521

NGC 1169 (UGC 2503) is an intermediate barred spiral galaxy in the constellation of Perseus. NGC 1169 has a reddish center, indicating the region is dominated by older stars. In contrast, the outer ring contains larger blue-white stars, a sign of recent star formation. The entire galaxy is rotating at approximately 265 km/s.

NGC 1169 was discovered on December 11, 1786 by William Herschel. Measurements of its distance range from 20.9 Mpc - 49.7 Mpc with an average of 35.1 Mpc.
