= NGC 1288 =

Galaxy in the constellation Fornax

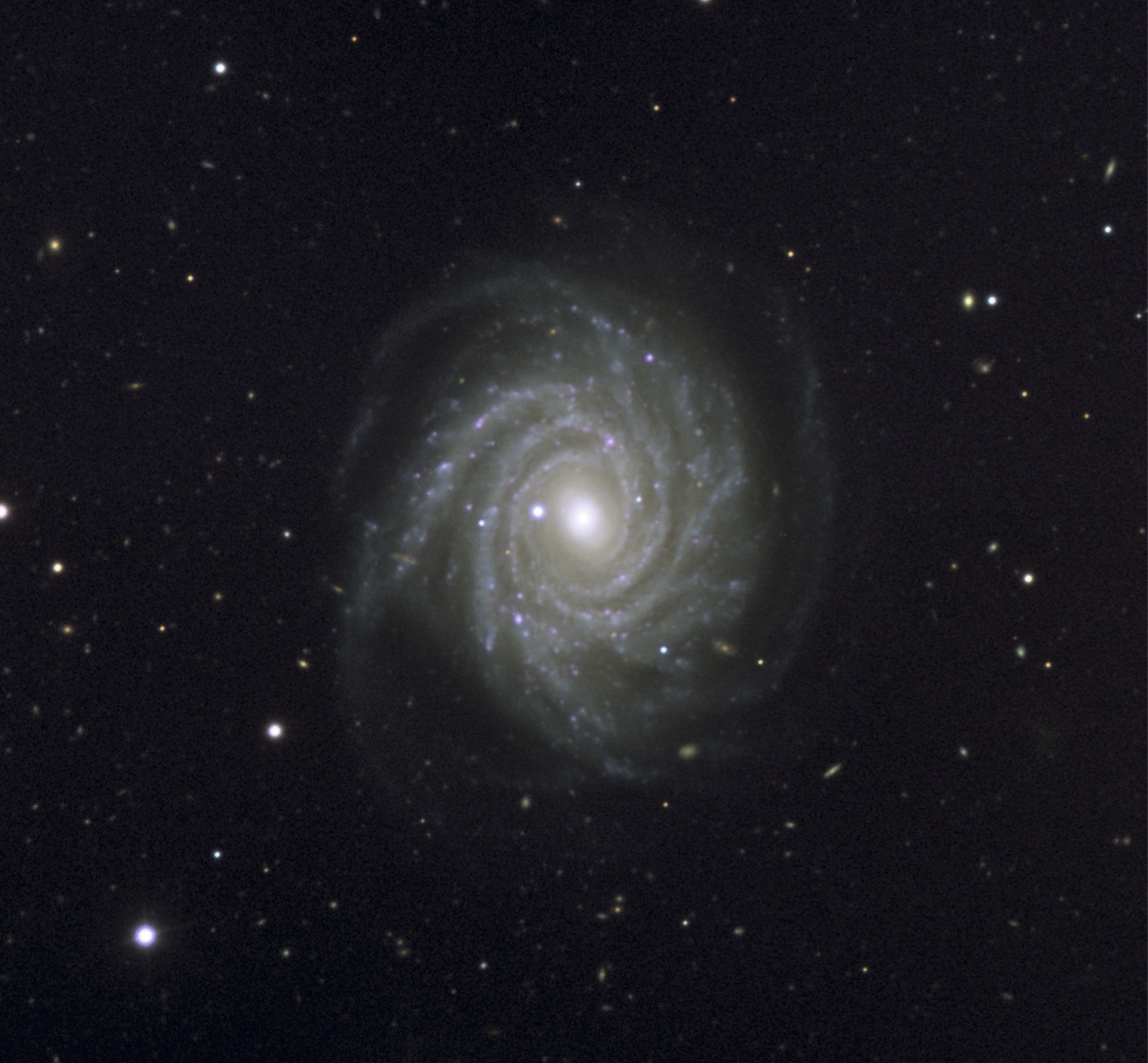
- Composite image of NGC 1288 taken with the Very Large Telescope. Supernova SN 2006dr is visible just to the left of the nucleus.

Observation data (J2000 epoch)
- Constellation: Fornax
- Right ascension: 03^{h} 17^{m} 13.176^{s}
- Declination: –32° 34′ 33.08″
- Redshift: 0.01500
- Heliocentric radial velocity: 4,497 km/s
- Distance: 196 Mly (60 Mpc)

Characteristics
- Type: SAB(rs)c
- Mass/Light ratio: 14 M_{☉}/L_{☉}
- Size: 65.72 kiloparsecs (214,250 light-years) (diameter; 26.0 mag/arcsec^{2} B-band isophote)
- Apparent size (V): 2′.2 × 1′.8

Other designations
- MCG -05-08-025, PGC 12204

NGC 1288 is an intermediate barred spiral galaxy located about 196 million light years away in the constellation Fornax. In the nineteenth century, English astronomer John Herschel described it as "very faint, large, round, very gradually little brighter middle." The morphological classification of SABc(rs) indicates weak bar structure across the nucleus (SAB), an incomplete inner ring orbiting outside the bar (rs), and the multiple spiral arms are moderately wound (c). The spiral arms branch at intervals of 120° at a radius of 30″ from the nucleus. The galaxy is most likely surrounded by a dark matter halo, giving it a mass-to-light ratio of 14 M_{☉}/L_{☉}.

== Supernova ==
On July 17, 2006, a supernova with a magnitude of 16.1 was imaged in this galaxy from Pretoria, South Africa, at 12″ east and 2″ of the galactic core. Designated SN 2006dr, it was determined to be a type Ia supernova.

== See also ==
- List of NGC objects
- List of NGC objects (1001-2000)
