= Q2343-BX418 =

Astronomical galaxy in the constellation Pegasus

Observation data (J2000 epoch)
- Constellation: Pegasus
- Right ascension: 23^{h} 46^{m} 18.57^{s}
- Declination: 12° 47′ 47.38″
- Redshift: 2.3052
- Apparent magnitude (V): 23.9

Characteristics
- Mass: 1.2×10^{10} M_{☉}

Other designations
- HB89 2343+125 BX418, PGC 4668402, SDSS J234618.57+124747.8

Q2343-BX418 is a young, low-metallicity dwarf galaxy located about 10 billion light-years away from Earth. It has a redshift of 2.3052, and a stellar mass of 500 million solar masses.

== Halo ==
In July 2018, new research was published suggesting that the galaxy was surrounded by a massive halo of diffuse gas 150,000 light-years in diameter, about ten times the size of the galaxy itself. The halo was measured to be giving off light in the Lyman-alpha line, an ultraviolet wavelength. By measuring the halo's spectra using the Keck Cosmic Web Imager at the Keck Observatory, the researchers found that the galaxy is surrounded by a roughly spherical outflow of gas. They also found that there are significant variations in the density and velocity of this gas.

Steidel's team had studied the galaxy before using other instruments at the Keck Observatory. However, the Keck Cosmic Web Imager allowed them to study the faint gas connecting galaxies, known as the cosmic web.

== See also ==
- List of galaxies
- List of nearest galaxies
