= AQU (disambiguation) =

- ICAO code for AirQuarius Aviation
- Al Qasimia University
- Agency for the Quality of the University System of Catalonia (AQU), regional agency of National Agency for Quality Assessment and Accreditation, Spain
- AQU 2 or Aquarius II, mildly elliptical dwarf satellite galaxy to the Milky Way
