= NGC 3598 =

Galaxy in the constellation Leo

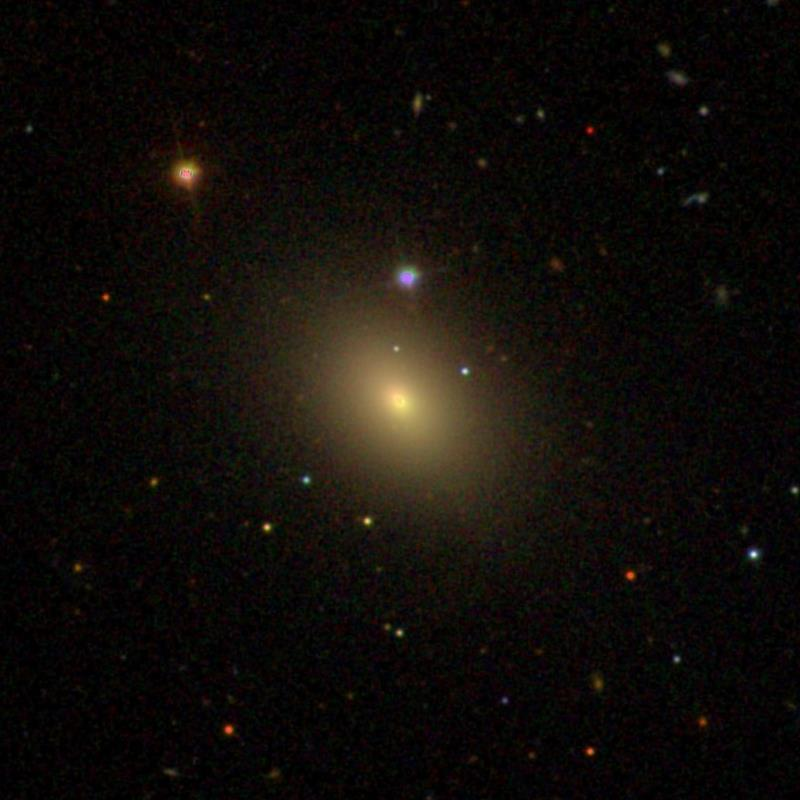
- SDSS image of NGC 3598

Observation data (J2000 epoch)
- Constellation: Leo
- Right ascension: 11^{h} 15^{m} 11.67^{s}
- Declination: +17° 15′ 45.7″
- Redshift: 0.02050
- Heliocentric radial velocity: 6146 km/s
- Distance: 311.9 ± 21.9 Mly (95.64 ± 6.71 Mpc)
- Apparent magnitude (B): 13.47

Characteristics
- Type: S0^{−}:

Other designations
- UGC 6278, MCG +03-29-014, PGC 34306

NGC 3598 is a lenticular galaxy located in the constellation Leo. It was discovered by the astronomer Albert Marth on March 4, 1865.

== See also ==
- List of galaxies
- List of largest galaxies
- List of nearest galaxies
