= Ursa Major II Dwarf =

Dwarf galaxy in Ursa Major

Ursa Major II Dwarf Galaxy
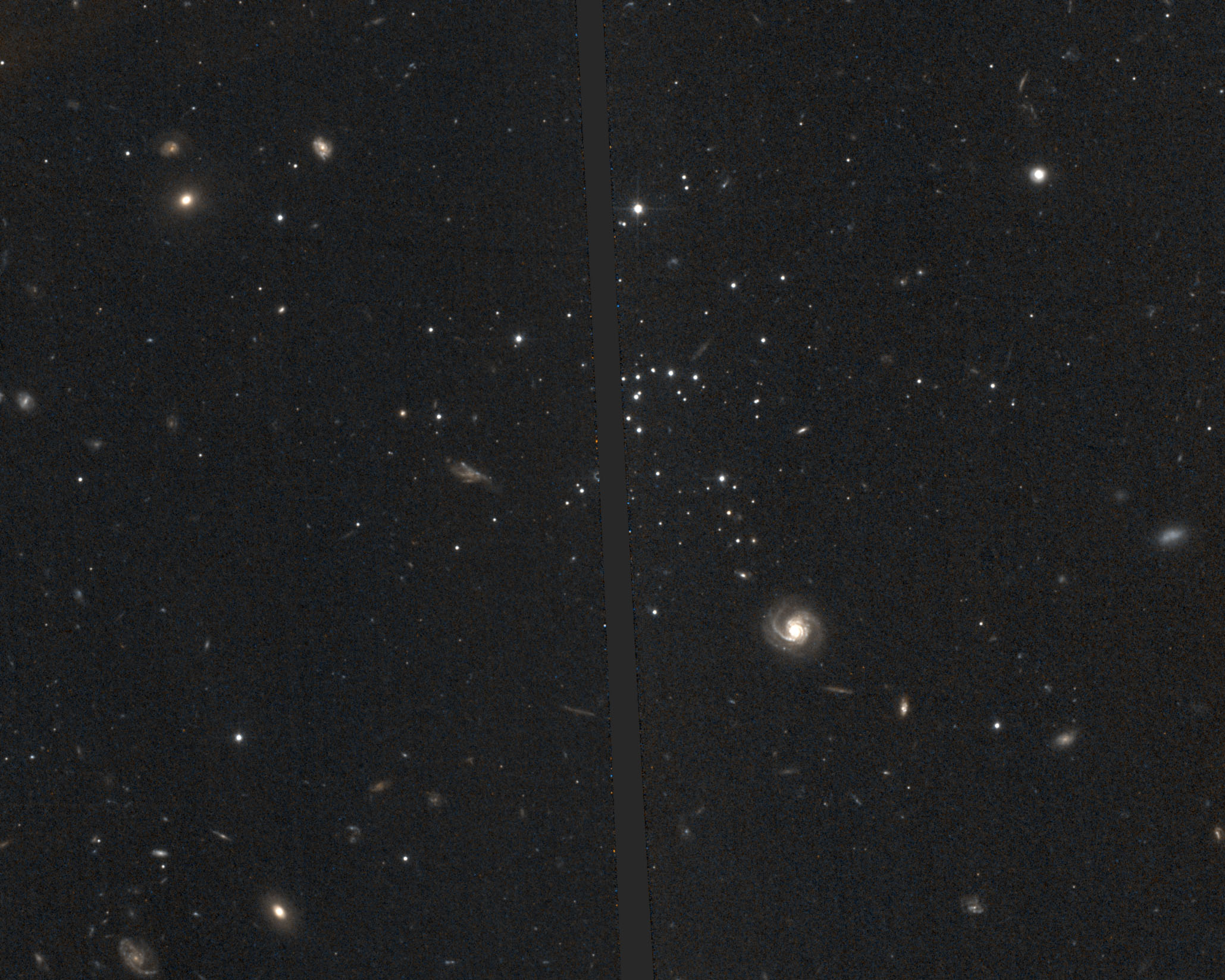
- Hubble image of the Ursa Major II Dwarf

Observation data (J2000 epoch)
- Constellation: Ursa Major
- Right ascension: 08^{h} 51^{m} 30.0^{s}
- Declination: +63° 07′ 48″
- Distance: 98 ± 16 kly (30 ± 5 kpc)
- Apparent magnitude (V): 14.3 ± 0.5

Characteristics
- Type: dSph
- Apparent size (V): 32 ± 2′

Other designations
- UMa II galaxy, Ursa Major II Dwarf

Ursa Major II Dwarf (UMa II dSph) is a dwarf spheroidal galaxy situated in the constellation Ursa Major and discovered in 2006 in the data obtained by the Sloan Digital Sky Survey. The galaxy is located approximately 30 kpc from the Sun and moves towards the Sun with the velocity of about 116 km/s. It has an elliptical (ratio of axes ~ 2:1) shape with the half-light radius of about 140 pc.

Ursa Major II is one of the smallest and faintest satellites (Note: Only Coma Berenices, Segue 1, Segue 2, Boötes II and Willman 1 are fainter.) of the Milky Way—its integrated luminosity is about 4000 times that of the Sun (absolute visible magnitude of about −4.2), which is much lower than the luminosity of the majority of globular clusters. UMa II is even less luminous than some stars, like Canopus in the Milky Way. It is comparable in luminosity to Bellatrix in Orion. However, its mass is about 5 million solar masses, which means that the galaxy's mass to light ratio is around 2000. This may be an overestimate as the galaxy has a somewhat irregular shape and may be in the process of tidal disruption.

The stellar population of UMa II consists mainly of old stars formed at least 10 billion years ago. The metallicity of these old stars is also very low at [Fe/H] ≈ −2.44 ± 0.06, which means that they contain 300 times less heavy elements than the Sun. The stars of UMa II were probably among the first stars to form in the Universe. Currently, there is no star formation in UMa II. The measurements have so far failed to detect any neutral hydrogen in it—the upper limit is only 562 solar masses.

== See also ==
- Ursa Major I Dwarf
- Ursa Minor Dwarf
