= Andromeda XVII =

Dwarf satellite galaxy

Observation data
- Constellation: Andromeda
- Right ascension: 00h 37m 07s
- Declination: +44° 19′ 20″

Characteristics
- Type: dSph

Andromeda XVII (And XVII) is a low luminosity spheroidal dwarf galaxy that is a satellite of the Andromeda galaxy. It is located around 44 kiloparsecs from the Andromeda galaxy.

This galaxy may have three associated globular clusters surrounding it which means that if confirmed, would make Andromeda XVII unusual for its type.
