= NGC 4163 =

Galaxy in constellation Canes Venatici

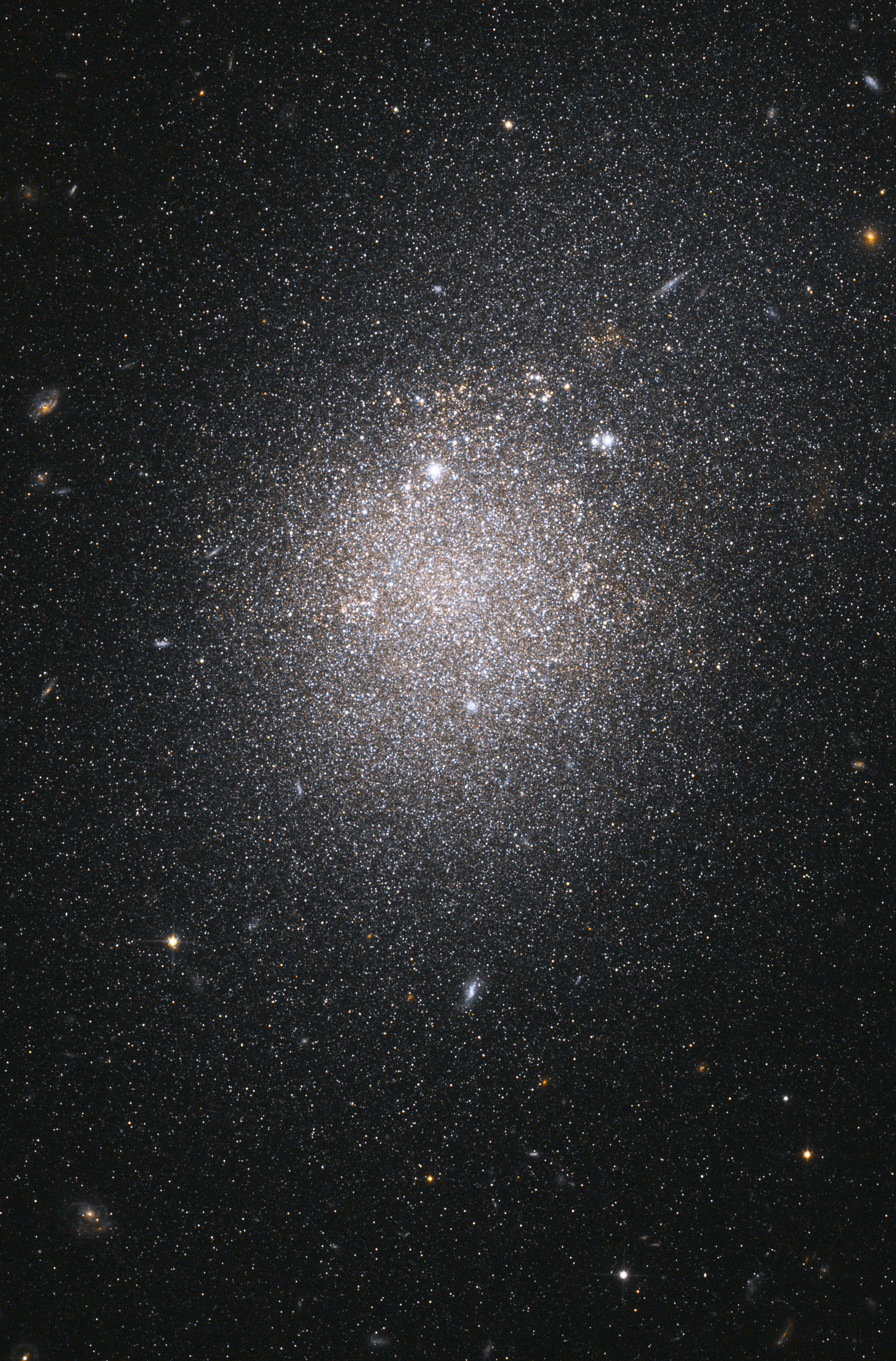
- Hubble Space Telescope image of NGC 4163

Observation data (J2000 epoch)
- Constellation: Canes Venatici
- Right ascension: 12^{h} 12.9^{m}
- Declination: 36° 10′
- Distance: 2.959 megaparsecs (9.65 Mly)
- Apparent magnitude (V): 14.5

Characteristics
- Type: dIrr
- Apparent size (V): 1.9′ × 1.6′

Other designations
- NGC 4167, UGC 7199, PGC 38881, MCG 6-27-26

NGC 4163, also known as NGC 4167, is a dwarf irregular galaxy in the constellation Canes Venatici, about 9.65 million light-years away. It was discovered by William Herschel on April 28, 1785 as NGC 4163. John Herschel discovered it again on March 11, 1831 as NGC 4167. It has a size on the night sky of 1.9 x 1.6, which, at its distance, gives a diameter of 4000 light-years. This galaxy consists of young blue stars. It is a member of the M94 Group.
