= Ursa Major I Dwarf =

Satellite galaxy of the Milky Way

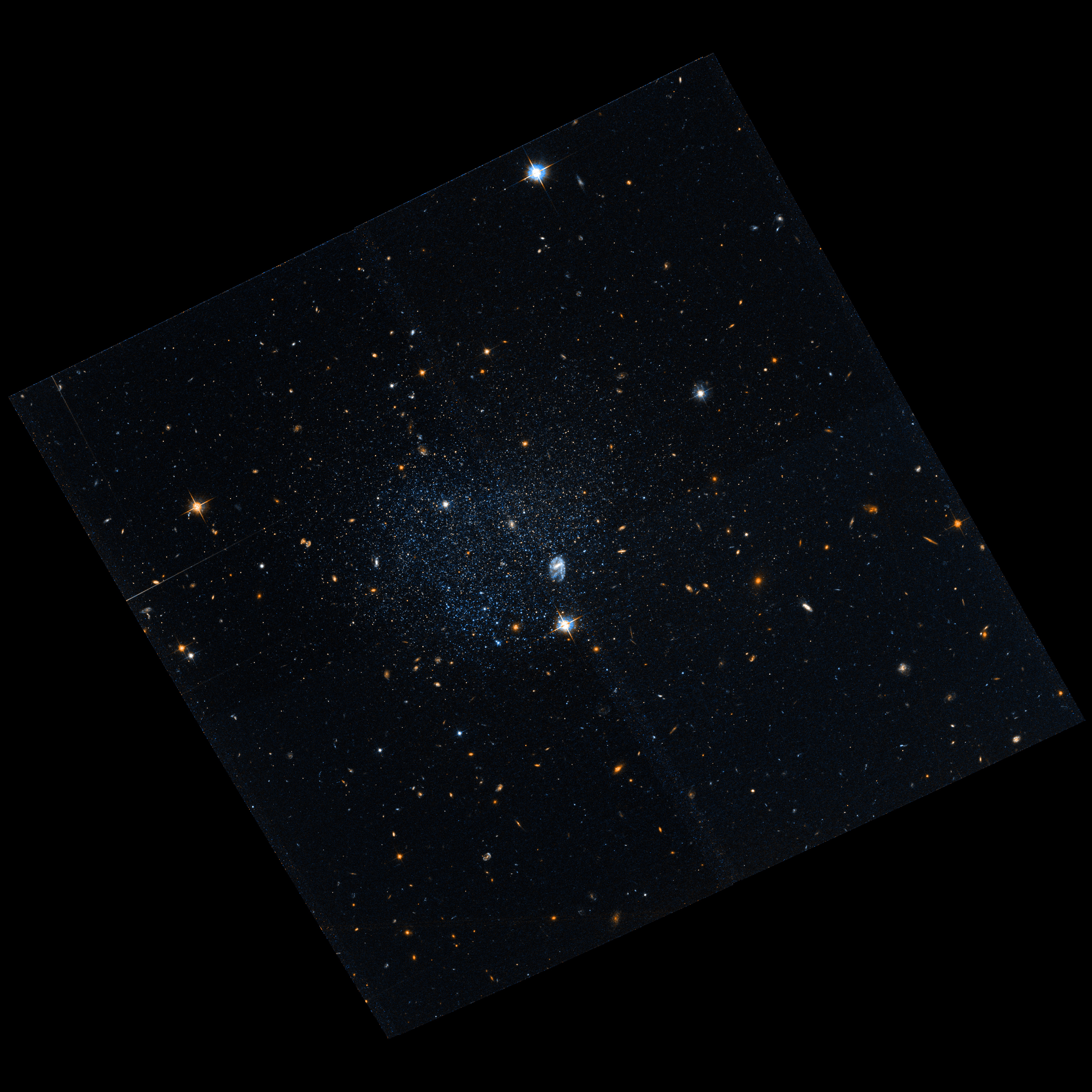

Observation data (J2000 epoch)
- Constellation: Ursa Major
- Right ascension: 10^{h} 34^{m} 52.8^{s}
- Declination: +51° 55′ 12″
- Distance: 330,000 light-years (100 kpc)

Characteristics
- Type: dSph

Other designations
- UMa I dwarf, Ursa Major I dSph

Ursa Major I Dwarf (UMa I dSph) is a dwarf spheroidal galaxy that orbits the Milky Way galaxy. It was discovered in 2005 within the constellation Ursa Major and is the third least luminous known galaxy.

== Discovery ==
It was discovered by Beth Willman, Julianne J. Dalcanton, David Martinez-Delgado, and Andrew A. West in 2005.

== Properties ==
Being a small dwarf galaxy, it measures only a few thousand light-years in diameter. As of 2006, it is the third least luminous galaxy known (discounting possible dark galaxies such as VIRGOHI21 in the Virgo Cluster of galaxies), after the Boötes Dwarf (absolute magnitude −5.7) and the more recently discovered Ursa Major II Dwarf (absolute magnitude −3.8). The absolute magnitude of the galaxy is estimated to be only −6.75, meaning that it is less luminous than some stars, like Deneb in the Milky Way. It is comparable in luminosity to Rigel. It has been described as similar to the Sextans Dwarf Galaxy. Both galaxies are ancient and metal-deficient.

It is estimated to be located at a distance of about 330,000 light-years (100 kpc) from the Earth. That is about twice the distance to the Large Magellanic Cloud; the largest and most luminous satellite galaxy of the Milky Way.

== Related objects ==
There was another object called "Ursa Major Dwarf", discovered by Edwin Hubble in 1949. It was designated as Palomar 4. Due to its peculiar look, it was temporarily suspected to be either a dwarf spheroidal or elliptical galaxy. However, it has since been found to be a very distant (about 360,000 ly) globular cluster belonging to our galaxy.

The Ursa Major II Dwarf was discovered in 2006 in Ursa Major and is also extraordinarily dim.

== See also ==
- Ursa Minor Dwarf
