= Draco II =

Extremely faint candidate satellite galaxy of the Milky Way

Draco II / Laevens 4
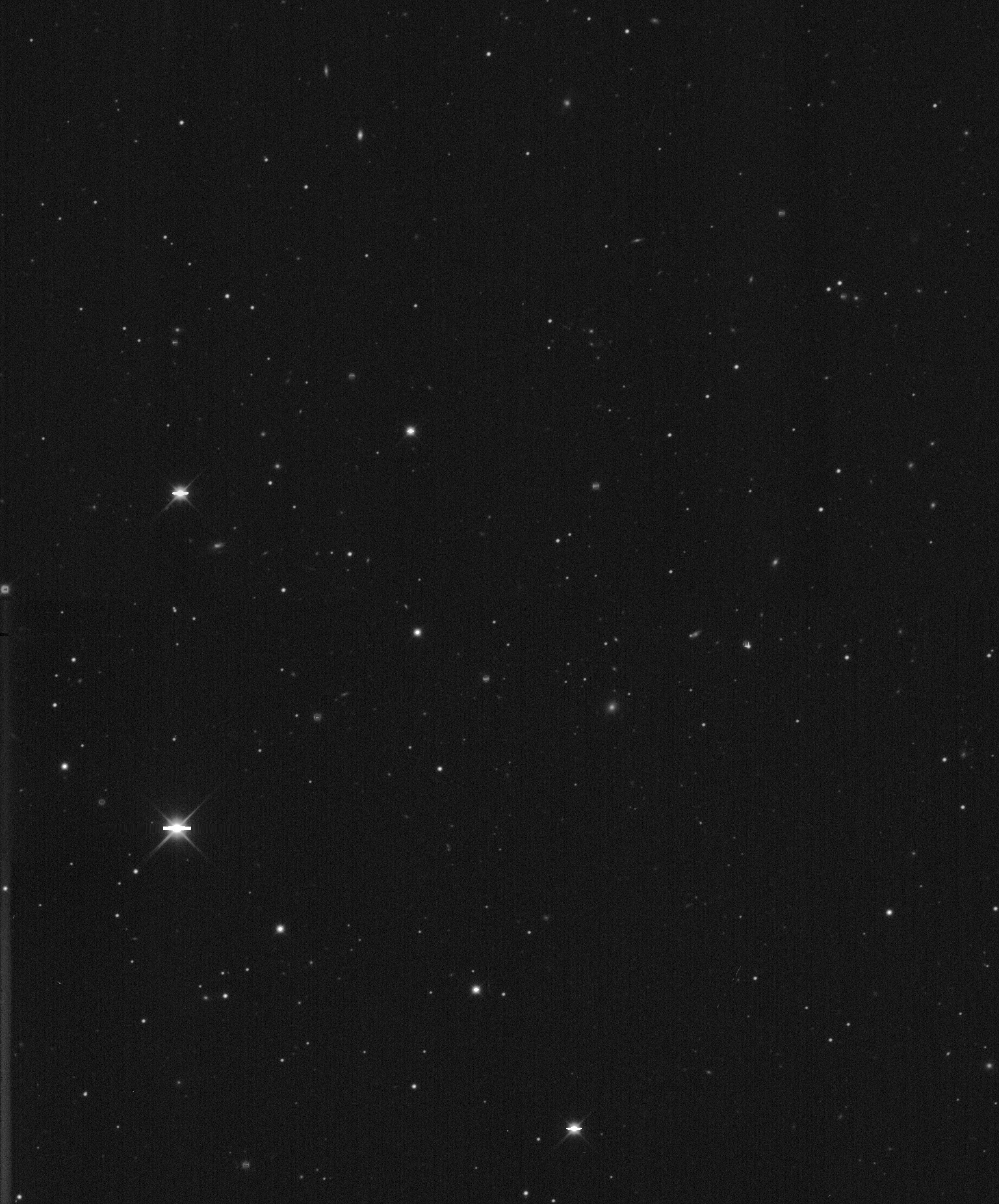
- Photograph of the Draco II satellite galaxy.

Observation data (J2000 epoch)
- Constellation: Draco
- Right ascension: 15^{h} 52^{m} 47.6^{s}
- Declination: +64° 33′ 55″
- Distance: 70.1±1.3 kly (21.5±0.4 kpc)
- Absolute magnitude (V): −0.8+0.4 −1

Characteristics
- Type: dSph
- Mass/Light ratio: 2.7+0.5 −0.8 M_{☉}/L_{☉}
- Size: 324 ly

Other designations
- Lae 4, Dra II

Draco II / Leavens 4 is a dwarf satellite galaxy orbiting the Milky Way discovered by the Pan-STARRS1 3π survey in 2015. Currently, it is both one of the nearest and dimmest galaxies known to astronomers. Analysis of its stars' distribution in color–magnitude space show that Draco II is approximately 13.5 billion years old.
