= DDO 44 =

Dwarf spheroidal galaxy in the constellation Camelopardalis

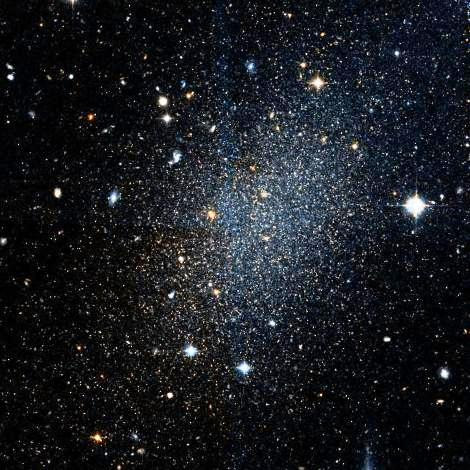
- An image of DDO 44, as taken by the Hubble Space Telescope

Observation data (J2000 epoch)
- Constellation: Camelopardalis
- Right ascension: 07^{h} 34^{m} 11.5^{s}
- Declination: +66° 52′ 47″
- Redshift: 0.000711
- Distance: 9.82 ± 0.59 Mly
- Apparent magnitude (V): 15.6

Characteristics
- Type: dSph
- Apparent size (V): 1′.51 × 0′.998

Other designations
- UGCA 133, Anon 0729+66, LEDA 21302, KK98a 61, KK98a 072913.1+665940

DDO 44 (or UGCA 133) is a dwarf spheroidal galaxy in the M81 Group, believed to be a satellite galaxy of the nearby NGC 2403.

== Structure ==
DDO 44 is a relatively large dwarf galaxy, and it has been observed to possess a tidal tail extending at least 50,000 parsecs from its center. It has an estimated metallicity ([Fe/H]) of –1.54 ± 0.14. Due to its proximity and relative velocity to the larger NGC 2403, it is believed to be NGC 2403's satellite galaxy. Stellar streams has been observed to originate from DDO 44, flowing towards and away for NGC 2403, indicating tidal disruptions. Around 20 percent of the galaxy's stars are believed to be of intermediate age (between 2 and 8 Gya), with the most recent stellar formation being estimated at 300 Mya due to a lack of young bright blue stars. This lack of bright stars caused DDO 44 to have a relatively low level of brightness.

It is located approximately 3 million parsecs away from the Milky Way, and 79 arcminutes towards north-northwest from NGC 2403 (or approximately 75 kpc). Mass estimates based on luminosity measurements give a galactic mass of 2×10^{7}–6×10^{7} M_{☉}. This makes DDO 44 by far NGC 2403's most massive known satellite galaxy, with the other known satellite galaxy (MADCASH J074238+652501-dw) having a mass of just ~10^{5} M_{☉}. H_{I} observations place an upper limit for DDO 44's hydrogen gas mass at 4×10^{5} M_{☉}.

== Bibliography ==
- Alonso-García, Javier; Mateo, Mario; Aparicio, Antonio (2006). "DDO 44 and UGC 4998: Distances, Metallicities, and Star Formation Histories". Publications of the Astronomical Society of the Pacific. 118 (842): 580–589. Bibcode:2006PASP..118..580A. doi:10.1086/502984. ISSN 0004-6280. S2CID 120814156.
- Carlin, Jeffrey L.; Garling, Christopher T.; Peter, Annika H. G.; Crnojević, Denija; Forbes, Duncan A.; Hargis, Jonathan R.; Mutlu-Pakdil, Burçin; Pucha, Ragadeepika; Romanowsky, Aaron J.; Sand, David J.; Spekkens, Kristine; Strader, Jay; Willman, Beth (2019). "Tidal Destruction in a Low-mass Galaxy Environment: The Discovery of Tidal Tails around DDO 44". The Astrophysical Journal. 886 (2): 109. arXiv:1906.08260. Bibcode:2019ApJ...886..109C. doi:10.3847/1538-4357/ab4c32. ISSN 1538-4357. S2CID 195218404.
- Karachentsev, I. D.; Sharina, M. E.; Grebel, E. K.; Dolphin, A. E.; Geisler, D.; Guhathakurta, P.; Hodge, P. W.; Karachentseva, V. E.; Sarajedini, A.; Seitzer, P. (1999). "The dwarf spheroidal galaxy DDO 44: stellar populations and distance". Astronomy and Astrophysics. 352: 399. arXiv:astro-ph/9910402. Bibcode:1999A&A...352..399K.
- Karachentsev, Igor; Kaisina, Elena; Kaisin, Serafim; Makarova, Lidia (2011). "Emission sparks around M 81 and in some dwarf spheroidal galaxies: Emission sparks in dSph galaxies". Monthly Notices of the Royal Astronomical Society: Letters. 415 (1): L31 – L34. arXiv:1104.5318. doi:10.1111/j.1745-3933.2011.01069.x.
