= Canes Venatici II =

Galaxy in constellation Canes Venatici

Canes Venatici II Dwarf Galaxy

Observation data (J2000 epoch)
- Constellation: Canes Venatici
- Right ascension: 12^{h} 57^{m} 10^{s}
- Declination: +34° 19′ 15″
- Distance: 490+49 −43 kly (150+15 −13 kpc); 522+16 −13 kly (160+4 −5 kpc)
- Apparent magnitude (V): 15.1±0.5

Characteristics
- Type: dSph
- Apparent size (V): 3.2′+0.6′ −0.4′

Other designations
- CVn II (Note: The galaxy was also independently discovered by T. Sakamoto and T. Hasegawa as SDSS J1257+3419.), PGC 4713558

Canes Venatici II or CVn II is a dwarf spheroidal galaxy situated in the constellation Canes Venatici and discovered in 2006 in data obtained by the Sloan Digital Sky Survey. The galaxy is located at a distance of about 150 kpc from the Sun and moves towards the Sun with the velocity of about 130 km/s. It is classified as a dwarf spheroidal galaxy (dSph) meaning that it has an elliptical (ratio of axes ~ 2:1) shape with a half-light radius of about 74+14
−10 pc.

CVn II is one of the smallest and faintest satellites of the Milky Way—its integrated luminosity is about 8,000 times that of the Sun (absolute visible magnitude of about −4.9), which is much lower than the luminosity of a typical globular cluster. However, its mass is about 2.5 million solar masses, which means that its mass to light ratio is around 340. A high mass to light ratio implies that CVn II is dominated by dark matter.

The stellar population of CVn II consists mainly of old stars formed more than 12 billion years ago. The metallicity of these old stars is also very low at [Fe/H] ≈ −2.19±0.58, which means that they contain 150 times less heavy elements than the Sun. The stars of CVn II were probably among the first stars to form in the Universe. Currently there is no star formation in CVn II. Measurements have so far failed to detect neutral hydrogen in it—the upper limit is 14000 solar masses.
