= NGC 3741 =

Galaxy in the constellation Ursa Major

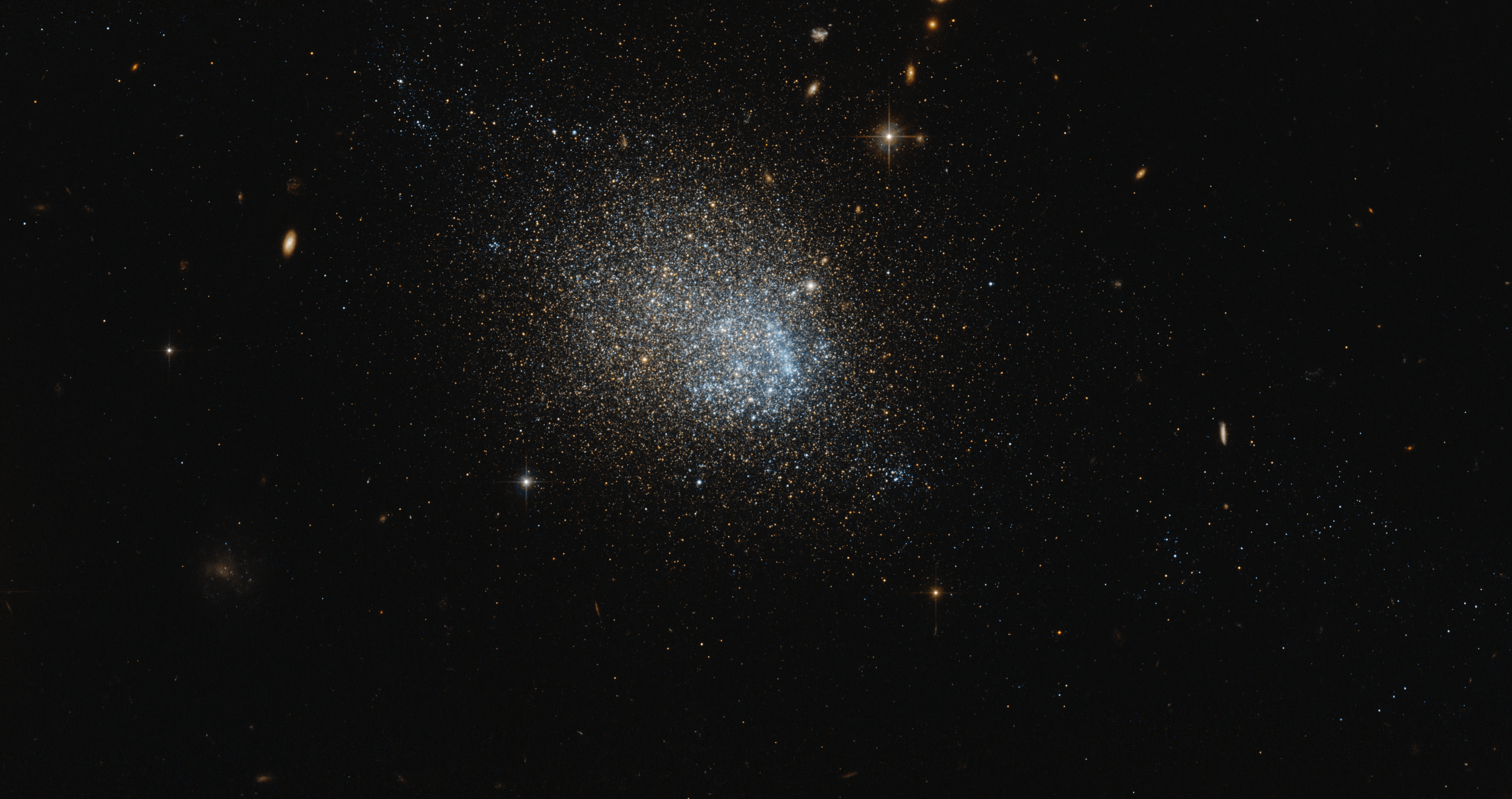
- Hubble Space Telescope image of NGC 3741

Observation data (J2000 epoch)
- Constellation: Ursa Major
- Right ascension: 11^{h} 36^{m} 05^{s}
- Declination: +45° 17′ 02″
- Redshift: 0.000764
- Heliocentric radial velocity: 229 ± 4 km/s
- Distance: 10 Mly (3.2 Mpc)
- Apparent magnitude (V): 14.23
- Apparent magnitude (B): 14.55

Characteristics
- Type: ImIII/BCD

Other designations
- NGC 3741, UGC 6572, MCG +08-21-068, PGC 35878, SDSS J113605.75+451702.9

NGC 3741 is an irregular galaxy in the constellation Ursa Major. It was discovered by John Herschel on March 19, 1828. At a distance of about 10 million light-years (3.2 Mpc), it is located in the M94 Group. It is relatively undisturbed by other galaxies.

NGC 3741 is an unusual galaxy in several aspects. It has a disk of neutral hydrogen (H I) that is extremely wide, extending some 23,000 light-years (7 kpc). The disk is strongly but symmetrically warped. With a mass-to-light ratio of M_{T}/L_{B} ~ 149, it is highly rich in dark matter.

NGC 3741 has a central bar and a faint spiral arm rich in H I. The bar rotates slowly, likely due to interaction with the dark matter. The bar and spiral arms would make NGC 3741 a low-luminosity spiral galaxy. The unusual properties could be explained if NGC 3741 were a late-stage merger between a low-mass companion or if it accreted mass from the intergalactic medium.
