= Coma Berenices (dwarf galaxy) =

Galaxy in constellation Coma Berenices

Coma Berenices Dwarf Galaxy

Observation data (J2000 epoch)
- Constellation: Coma Berenices
- Right ascension: 12^{h} 26^{m} 59^{s}
- Declination: +23° 55′ 09″
- Distance: 143±13 kly (44±4 kpc); 137+5 −3 kly (42+2 −1 kpc)
- Apparent magnitude (V): 14.5 ± 0.5

Characteristics
- Type: dSph
- Apparent size (V): 11.8′

Other designations
- Coma Dwarf, PGC 4713557

Coma Berenices or Com is a dwarf spheroidal galaxy situated in the constellation Coma Berenices and discovered in 2006 in data obtained by the Sloan Digital Sky Survey. The galaxy is located at the distance of about 44 kpc from the Sun and moves away from the Sun with the velocity of about 98 km/s. It is classified as a dwarf spheroidal galaxy (dSph) meaning that it has an elliptical (ratio of axes ~ 5:3) shape with the half-light radius of about 70 pc.

Com is one of the smallest and faintest satellites (Note: Only Segue 1, Segue 2, Bootes II and Willman 1 are fainter.) of the Milky Way—its integrated luminosity is about 3700 times that of the Sun (absolute visible magnitude of about −4.1), which is much lower than the luminosity of the majority of globular clusters. However, its mass is about 1.2 million solar masses, which means that galaxy's mass to light ratio is around 450. A high mass-to-light ratio implies that Com is dominated by dark matter.

The stellar population of Com consists mainly of old stars formed more than 12 billion years ago. The metallicity of these old stars is also very low at [Fe/H] ≈ −2.53±0.45, which means that they contain 350 times less heavy elements than the Sun. The stars of Com were probably among the first stars to form in the Universe and currently there is no star formation in Com. The measurements have so far failed to detect any neutral hydrogen in it—the upper limit is only 46 solar masses.

Coma Dwarf is located near the Sagittarius Stream, which is made of stars stripped from the Sagittarius Dwarf Elliptical Galaxy. This association may indicate that Com is a former satellite of star cluster from that galaxy.
