= Virgo I =

Extremely faint satellite galaxy of the Milky Way

Observation data (J2000 epoch)
- Constellation: Virgo
- Right ascension: 12^{h} 00^{m} 09.6^{s}
- Declination: −00° 40′ 48″
- Distance: 280+42 −26 kly (87 ^{+13}_{−8} kpc)
- Absolute magnitude (V): −0.8 ± 0.9

Characteristics
- Type: dSph
- Half-light radius (physical): 38+12 −11 pc
- Half-light radius (apparent): 1.5′

Other designations
- Virgo I

Virgo I is an extremely faint satellite galaxy of the Milky Way. It was discovered in the Subaru Strategic Survey. Virgo I has an absolute visual magnitude of −0.8 making it one of the least luminous galaxies confirmed thus far. The galaxy has a radius of 124 light years, (half light radius 38 pc) meaning that it is too big to be a globular cluster. Cetus II is dimmer, but too small to be classed as a galaxy. Virgo I is dimmer than Segue I, the previous dimmest known. The distance to Virgo I is 87 kiloparsecs (280,000 ly).
