= UGCA 292 =

Third most metal-poor galaxy known

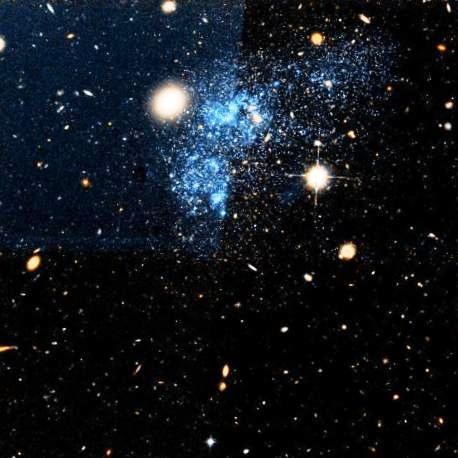
- Image of UGCA 292 by the Hubble Space Telescope

Observation data
- Constellation: Canes Venatici
- Right ascension: 12h 38m
- Declination: +32° 45'
- Distance: 10 million ly

Characteristics
- Type: Dwarf irregular
- Notable features: Gas rich and metal poor

Other designations
- CVn I dwA

UGCA 292 (also known as CVn l dwA) is an extremely metal-poor irregular dwarf galaxy being the third lowest metallicity galaxy discovered. It also has the record for being of the nearest metal-poor galaxies known. It is located at a relatively nearby distance of 3.1 mpc in the constellation of Canes Venatici.

The galaxy is unevolved with lots of gas making up a significant fraction the galaxies mass and the low metallicity.

== Scientific importance ==
Due to its close distance to our galaxy (the Milky Way), it provides a unique opportunity to study gas rich galaxies with high star formation but low metallicity. The close proximity also makes it possible to resolve stellar populations.
