= IC 4662 =

Irregular Galaxy in the constellation Pavo

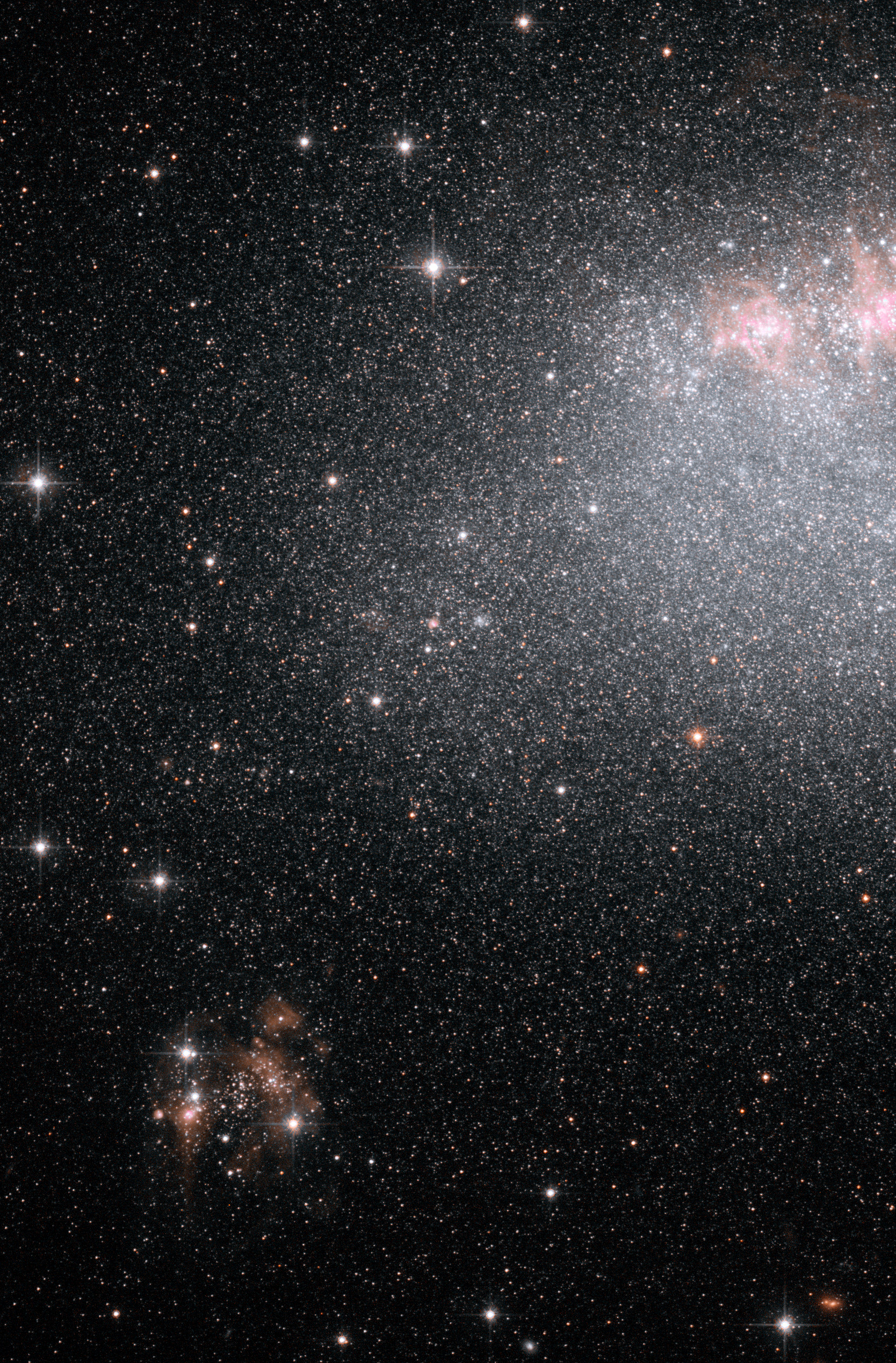
- Hubble Space Telescope image of IC 4662

Observation data (J2000 epoch)
- Constellation: Pavo
- Right ascension: 17^{h} 47.8^{m}
- Declination: −64° 38′
- Distance: 2.440 megaparsecs (7.96 Mly)
- Apparent magnitude (V): 11.3

Characteristics
- Type: Irr
- Apparent size (V): 3.2′ × 1.9′

Other designations
- ESO 102-14, PGC 60851, IRAS 17422-6437

IC 4662, also known as ESO 102-14, is an irregular galaxy located in the constellation Pavo 7.96 million light years away. It was discovered by Robert T. A. Innes in 1901. It has a diameter of 7000 light years and an angular size of 3.2' x 1.9'.

IC 4662 is part of a Hubble study of starbursts in nearby, small, or dwarf, galaxies. Based on this study, astronomers have found that starbursts continue 100 times longer than first thought, lasting 200 million to 400 million years. These galaxies show that starbursts are not isolated events, but sweep across a galaxy. On the Hubble image is one of the H II regions of the galaxy.
