= Boötes III =

Galaxy

Boötes III Dwarf Galaxy

Observation data (J2000 epoch)
- Constellation: Boötes
- Right ascension: 13^{h} 57^{m} 00^{s}
- Declination: +26° 48′ 00″
- Distance: 150 kly (46 kpc)
- Apparent magnitude (V): 12.6

Characteristics
- Type: dSph?
- Apparent size (V): 1.5 × 0.8°

Other designations
- Boo III, PGC 4713562

Boötes III is an overdensity in the Milky Way's halo, which may be a disrupted dwarf spheroidal galaxy. It is situated in the constellation Boötes and was discovered in 2009 in the data obtained by the Sloan Digital Sky Survey. The galaxy is located at the distance of about 46 kpc from the Sun and moves away from it at the speed of about 200 km/s. It has an elongated shape (axis ratio of 2:1) with the radius of about 0.5 kpc. The large size and an irregular shape may indicate that Boötes III in a transitional phase between a gravitationally bound galaxy and completely unbound system.

Boötes III is one of the smallest and faintest satellites of the Milky Way—its integrated luminosity is about 18,000 times that of the Sun (absolute visible magnitude of about −5.8), which is much lower than the luminosity of many globular clusters. The mass of Boötes III is difficult to estimate because the galaxy is in process of being disrupted. In this case the velocity dispersion of its stars is not related to its mass.

The stellar population of Boötes III consists mainly of moderately old stars formed more than 12 billion years ago. The metallicity of these old stars is low at [Fe/H]=−2.1 ± 0.2, which means that they contain 120 times less heavy element than the Sun. Boötes III might be the source of stars of the Styx stream in the galactic halo, which was discovered together with this galaxy.
