= Pisces Overdensity =

Clump of stars within the halo of the Milky Way

Observation data (J2000 epoch)
- Constellation: Pisces
- Right ascension: 23^{h} 19^{m} 00^{s}
- Declination: +00° 00′ 00″
- Distance: 260 kly (80 kpc)
- Absolute magnitude (V): −10.35

Characteristics
- Type: dIrr/dSph
- Apparent size (V): ~1°

Other designations
- Pisces Plume

The Pisces Overdensity is a clump of stars in the Milky Way's halo, which may be a disrupted dwarf spheroidal galaxy. It is situated in the constellation Pisces and was discovered in 2009 by analysis of distribution of RR Lyrae stars in the data obtained by the Sloan Digital Sky Survey's data. The galaxy is located at the distance of about 80 kpc from the Sun and moves towards it with a speed of about 75 km/s.

The Pisces Overdensity is one of the faintest satellites of the Milky Way. Its mass is estimated to be at least 10^{5} Solar masses. However it has a large size of about several degrees (around 1 kpc) and may be in a transitional phase between a gravitationally bound galaxy and completely unbound system. The Pisces Overdensity is located near the plane, where the Magellanic Clouds lie. There may exist a connection between the Magellanic Stream and this galaxy.
