= Cassiopeia 1 =

Cassiopeia 1 is a dwarf irregular galaxy located in the Milky Way's Zone of Avoidance and was discovered via radio observations in 1995. Based on archival images from the Hubble Space Telescope, stellar photometry of the Cassiopeia-1 dwarf galaxy was carried out. On the basis of TRGB-method, the exact distance was determined to be 1.61 Mpc, which shows that it is located on the border of the Local Group of galaxies and is isolated. Other studies have given 5 Mpc as its distance.

The galaxy has an ongoing star-formation with HII regions. Measurements showed however very low metallicity of Cassiopeia 1 stars.
