= NGC 4214 =

Galaxy in the constellation Canes Venatici

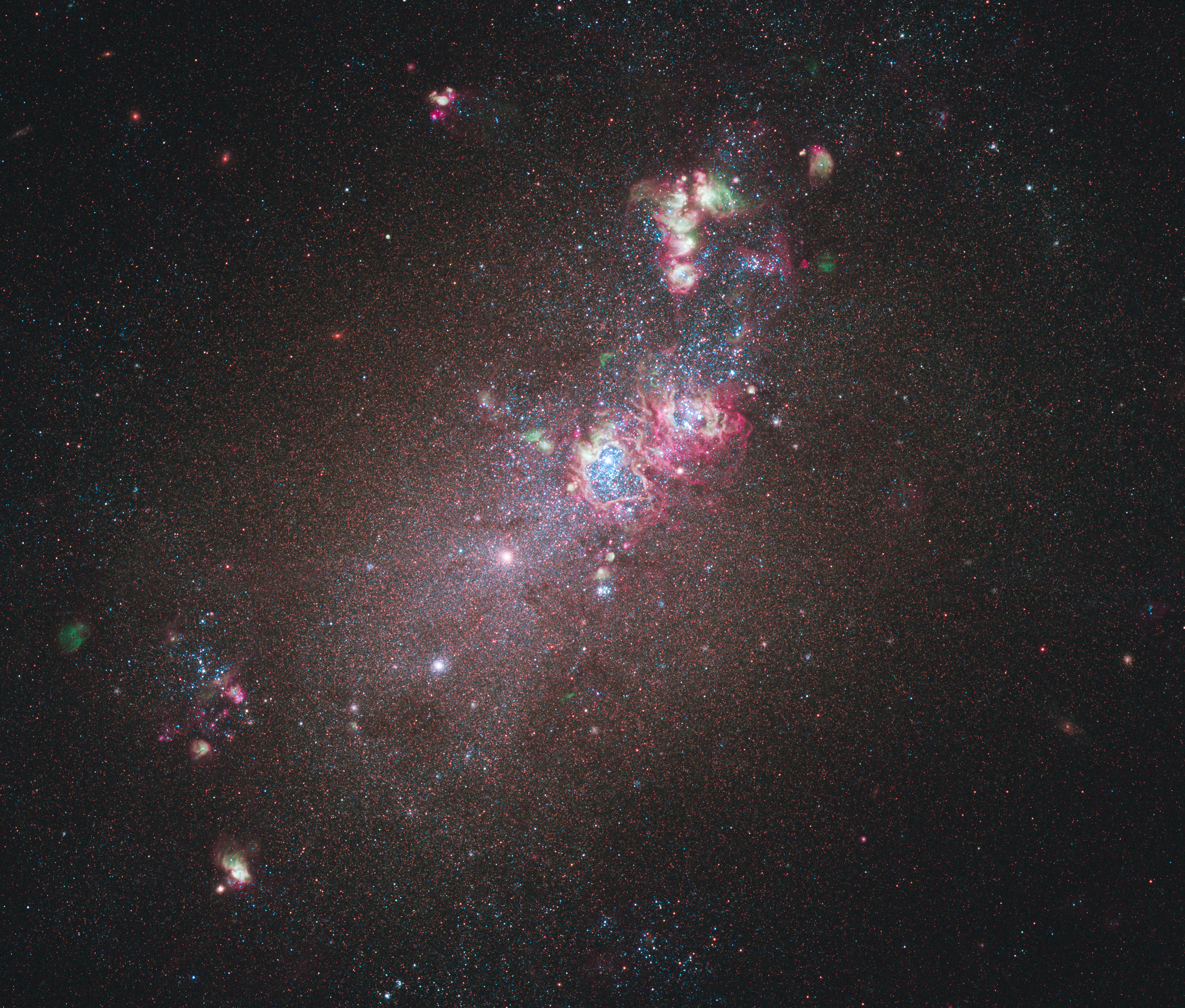
- NGC 4214 in Optical and near-infrared, imaged by Hubble's Wide Field Camera 3

Observation data (J2000 epoch)
- Constellation: Canes Venatici
- Right ascension: 12^{h} 15^{m} 39.17^{s}
- Declination: +36° 19′ 36.8″
- Redshift: 0.000971
- Heliocentric radial velocity: 291±1 km/s
- Distance: 9.72 ± 0.82 Mly (2.979 ± 0.252 Mpc)
- Apparent magnitude (V): 9.6

Characteristics
- Type: IAB(s)m
- Size: ~31,100 ly (9.53 kpc) (estimated)
- Apparent size (V): 8.0′ × 6.6′

Other designations
- KUG 1213+366, IRAS 12131+3636, NGC 4228, UGC 7278, MCG 6-27-42, PGC 39225, CGCG 187-32

NGC 4214 is a dwarf barred irregular galaxy located around 10 million light-years away in the constellation Canes Venatici. It was discovered on 28 April 1785 by German-British astronomer William Herschel. NGC 4214 is a member of the M94 Group.

== Characteristics ==
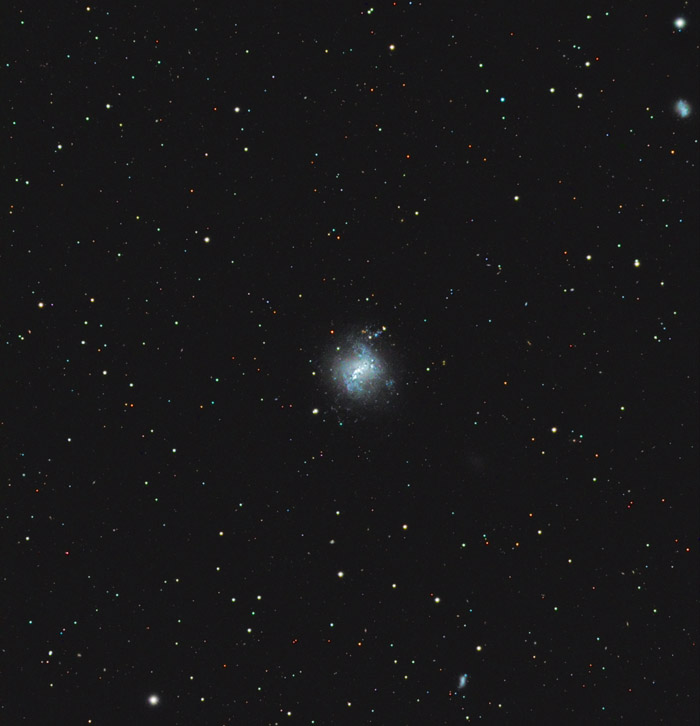
Amateur image of NGC 4214

NGC 4214 is both larger and brighter than the Small Magellanic Cloud as well as a starburst galaxy, with the largest star-forming regions (NGC 4214-I and NGC 4214-II) in the galaxy's center. Of the two, NGC 4214-I contains a super star cluster rich in Wolf–Rayet stars and NGC 4214-II is younger (age less than 3 million years), including a number of star clusters and stellar associations.

NGC 4214 also has two older super star clusters, both with an age of 200 million years and respective masses of 2.6×10^{5} and 1.5×10^{6} solar masses.

Two satellites are known to exist around the vicinity of NGC 4214. One is DDO 113, which has an absolute V-band magnitude of −12.2. It stopped star formation around 1 billion years ago. Another, more recently discovered object is MADCASH-2, officially named MADCASH J121007+352635-dw. The name refers to the MADCASH (Magellanic Analog Dwarf Companions and Stellar Halos) project. It is similar to typical ultra-faint dwarf galaxies, with an absolute V-band magnitude of −9.15, except in that it shows evidence of multiple episodes of star formation in its recent past: one around 400 million years ago, and another 1.5 billion years ago.

== Supernova and luminous blue variable ==
One supernova has been observed in NGC 4214:

- SN 1954A (Type Ib, mag. 9.8) was discovered by Paul Wild on 30 May 1954. (Note: Some sources incorrectly list the discovery date as 10 April 1954.)

The galaxy has hosted one luminous blue variable:

- SN 2010U (type LBV, mag. 16) was discovered by Kōichi Itagaki on 5 February 2010.

== See also ==
- NGC 4236 – a similar irregular galaxy
- List of NGC objects (4001–5000)
