= ESO 410-G005 =

Dwarf Spheroidal galaxy

Observation data
- Right ascension: 00 15 31.13
- Declination: -32 10 55.46
- Group or cluster: Sculptor group

Characteristics
- Type: dSh

ESO 410-G005 is a dwarf spheroid galaxy. It is a member of the Sculptor galaxy group but is relatively isolated. It has a low surface brightness.

The galaxy has a stellar population with intermediate age population.
