= Cetus III =

Ultra-faint dwarf galaxy

Cetus lll

Observation data
- Constellation: Cetus
- Right ascension: 02^{h} 05^{m} 19.4^{s}
- Declination: −04° 16′ 12.0″
- Distance: 818,652 ly
- Group or cluster: Milky Way subgroup

Characteristics
- Type: Ultra-faint dwarf
- Half-light radius (physical): 90

Cetus lll is an ultra-faint dwarf galaxy (UFD) that is a satellite galaxy to the Milky Way. It is located at a distance of 251 kiloparsecs in the constellation of Cetus. It has a half-light radius of 90 parsecs.

It was identified as a statistically significant overdensity of stars by the Subaru/Hyper Suprime-Cam Survey. Its small size made it invisible to the Sloan Digital Sky Survey.
