= Grus II =

Chemical enriched dwarf galaxy

Grus ll

Observation data
- Constellation: Grus
- Right ascension: 331.02
- Declination: -46.44
- Distance: 179,386 ly
- Group or cluster: Milky Way subgroup

Grus ll is an ultra-faint dwarf galaxy (UFD) located at a distance of 55 kiloparsecs from the Milky Way in the constellation of Grus.

It has a higher than expected ratio of [Mg/Ca] than other metal poor stars in ultra-diffuse galaxies. The chemical enrichment of Grus ll is from the stellar nucleosynthesis of core collapse supernovas from high mass stars over 20 solar masses and the merging of neutron stars. The stars within Grus ll may also possess a small enhancement of rapid neutron capture (r-process) elements.
