= Tucana IV =

Dwarf satellite galaxy in the Tucana constellation

Observation data
- Constellation: Tucana
- Distance: 156,555 ly
- Group or cluster: Milky Way subgroup

Characteristics
- Type: Dwarf galaxy
- Notable features: Close pass of the LMC

Tucana IV is an ultra-faint dwarf galaxy that is a satellite to the Milky Way galaxy. It lies at a distance of 48 kiloparsecs in the constellation of Tucana. It has a size of 127 parsecs.

It passed within 4 kiloparsecs (possibly a collision event) with the Large Magellanic Cloud (LMC) approximately 120 million years ago. This close passage of the LMC altered the trajectory of the galaxy and its internal kinematics.
