= Segue 1 =

Dwarf galaxy in the constellation Leo

Observation data (J2000 epoch)
- Constellation: Leo
- Right ascension: 10^{h} 07^{m} 04^{s}
- Declination: 16° 04′ 55″
- Distance: 75 ± 6.5 kly (23 ± 2 kpc)
- Apparent magnitude (V): 13.8 ± 0.5

Characteristics
- Type: dSph or GC
- Mass/Light ratio: 3400 (V) M_{☉}/L_{☉}
- Apparent size (V): 8.8′

Other designations
- Segue 1, PGC 4713559

Segue 1 is a dwarf spheroidal galaxy or globular cluster situated in the constellation Leo and discovered in 2006 by the Sloan Digital Sky Survey. It is located at a distance of about 23 kpc (about 75,000 light years) from the Sun and moves away from the Sun with a velocity of about 206 km/s. Segue 1 has a noticeably elongated (ratio of axes ~ 2:1) shape with a half-light radius of about 30 pc. This elongation may be caused by tidal forces from the Milky Way galaxy if Segue 1 is being disrupted now.

The name is due to the fact that it was found by the SEGUE program, the Sloan Extension for Galactic Understanding and Exploration.

== Properties ==
Segue 1 is one of the smallest and faintest satellites of the Milky Way—its integrated luminosity is about 300 times that of the Sun (absolute visible magnitude of about −1.5), (Note: From other sources the absolute magnitude is from −3 to −1.6.) which is much smaller than the luminosity of a typical globular cluster. Observations indicate its mass is about 600,000 solar masses, which means that Segue's 1 mass to light ratio is around 3400. Segue 1 had the highest known mass-to-light ratio of any observed galaxy as of 2011. A high mass to light ratio implies that Segue 1 may be dominated by dark matter. It is difficult, however, to estimate the mass of such faint objects due to significant foreground contamination, which inflates the velocity dispersion. In addition, any mass estimate is based on an implicit assumption that an object is gravitationally bound, which may not be true if it is being disrupted.

The stellar population of Segue 1 consists mainly of old stars formed more than 12 billion years ago. The metallicity of these old stars is also very low at [Fe/H] ≈ −2.5 ± 0.8, which means that they contain 300 times less heavy elements than the Sun. Currently there is no star formation in Segue 1. Measurements have so far failed to detect neutral hydrogen in it—the upper limit is 13 solar masses. The object is estimated to contain 1000 stars. Of these, seven have been found to be in the red giant stage. The chemical composition of Segue 1 indicates no substantial chemical evolution has occurred since the galaxy formed, supporting the idea that it may be a surviving first galaxy that experienced only one burst of star formation, a fossil galaxy from the early universe.

Segue 1 is located in the middle of the Sagittarius Stream and at approximately the same distance from the Sun. It may once have been a globular cluster of the Sagittarius Dwarf Elliptical Galaxy, which was later stripped from it by the tidal forces acting from the Milky Way galaxy. However, more recent studies concluded that Segue 1 is not actually associated with the Sagittarius stream and that it is not being tidally disrupted. If Segue 1 is a galaxy it may have been a satellite of the Sagittarius Dwarf Elliptical Galaxy in the past.

In the work published in 2025 the authors claim that the stellar dynamics of Segue 1 are best modeled by a point-like mass in its center with mass of (4.5±1.5)×10^{5} M_{☉} rather than dark matter. This point-like mass is interpreted as a supermassive black hole.
