= Boötes I =

Galaxy in the constellation Boötes

Boötes Dwarf Galaxy
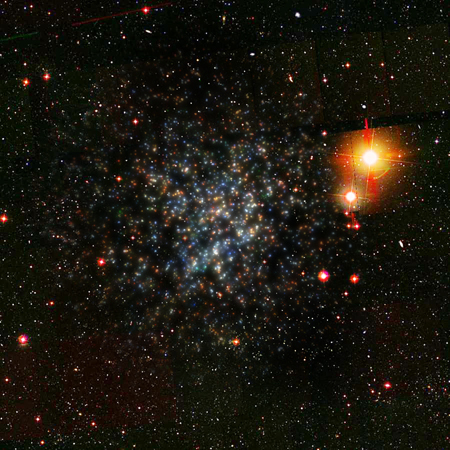
- SDSS image of Boo I

Observation data (J2000 epoch)
- Constellation: Boötes
- Right ascension: 14^{h} 00^{m} 06^{s}
- Declination: +14° 30′ 00″ ± 15″
- Distance: 197 ± 18 kly (60 ± 6 kpc)
- Apparent magnitude (V): 13.1^{[a]}

Characteristics
- Type: dSph
- Apparent size (V): 26.0′ ± 1.4′

Other designations
- Boo dSph, Boötes Satellite, Boötes Dwarf Spheroidal Galaxy, Boötes dSph galaxy, PGC 4713553

The Boötes Dwarf Galaxy (Boo I dSph) is a galaxy discovered in 2006, which appears faint, with a luminosity of 100,000 L_{☉} and an absolute magnitude of –5.8. It lies about 197,000 light-years (60.4 kiloparsecs) away in the constellation Boötes. This dwarf spheroidal galaxy appears to be tidally disrupted by the Milky Way Galaxy, which it orbits, and has two stellar tails that cross over to form a cross. Tidally disrupted galaxies usually only form one tail. The galaxy appears to be significantly elongated, with an ellipticity of ε = 0.68 ± 0.15.

Like many of the ultrafaint dwarf spheroidals, the entire galaxy appears fainter than the Rigel system (absolute magnitude –7.84). Even so, it is one of the more luminous UFDs. It is metal-poor, like other UFDs, with a mean metallicity of −2.34.

The stellar population of Boötes I is mostly very old stars. The two populations have essentially the same age, 13.4 billion and 13.3 billion years, respectively, with most of the stars being of the latter population.

== Notes ==
1. Apparent magnitude = Absolute magnitude + Distance modulus = –5.8 + 18.9 = 13.1
