= Aquarius III (galaxy) =

Ultra-faint dwarf galaxy on the Aquarius constellation

Aquarius lll
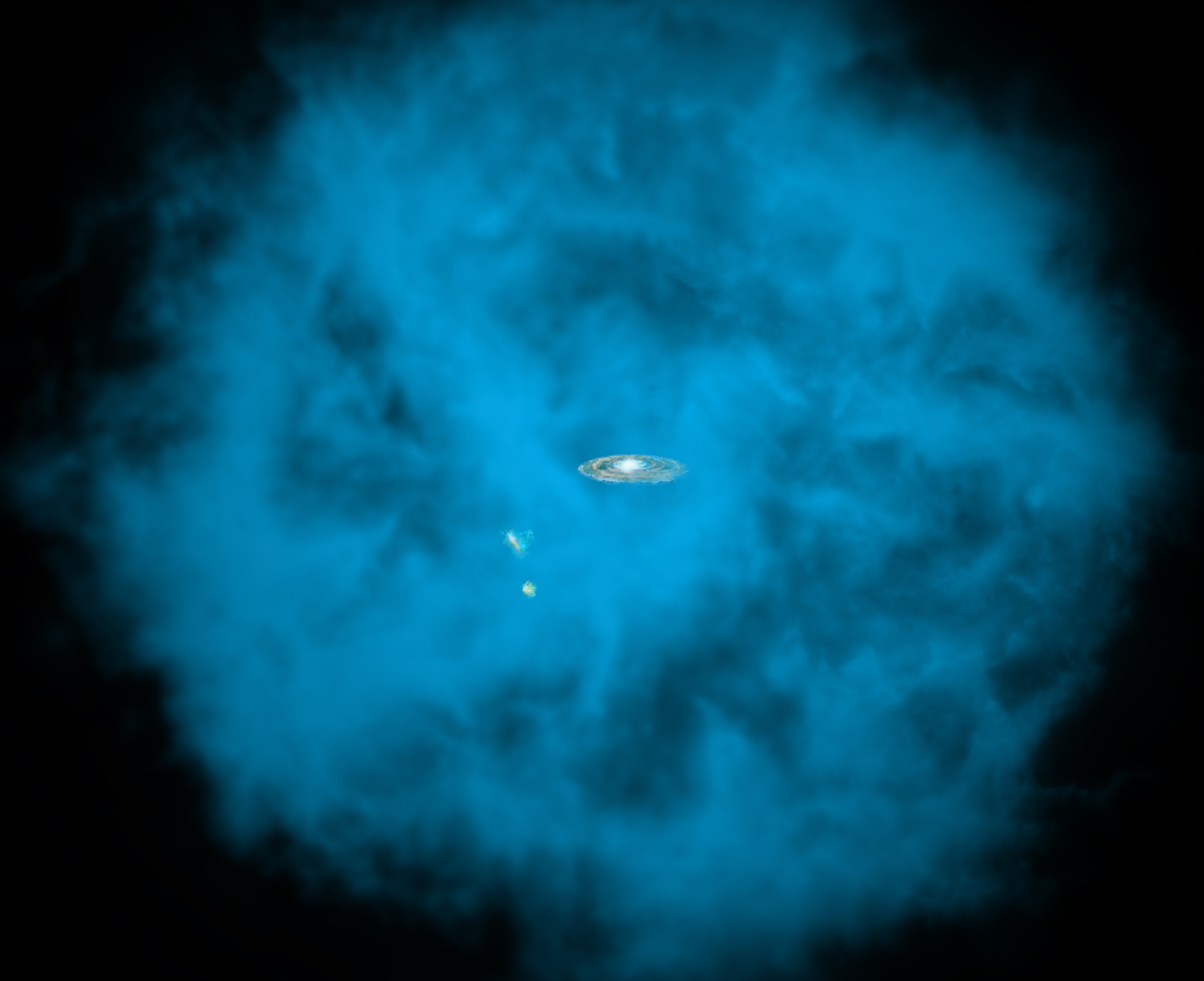
- Artistic illustration of the halo of the Milky Way galaxy which Aquarius lll is located in

Observation data
- Constellation: Aquarius
- Distance: 277,232 ly

Characteristics
- Type: Dwarf galaxy
- Notable features: Metal poor stars

Aquarius lll is an ultra-faint satellite dwarf galaxy located in the outer halo around 85 kiloparsecs from the Milky Way galaxy in the constellation of Aquarius. The stars within Aquarius lll are extremely metal poor. It could have at least one RR Lyrae star.

The galaxy is possibly on its first in fall to the galaxy. Notably, unlike other satellite galaxies orbiting the Milky Way galaxy, it had not experienced significant tidal disruption from the galactic disk.
