= Aquarius II =

Dwarf galaxy in the local group

Aquarius ll

Observation data
- Constellation: Aquarius
- Distance: 180,000 ly

Characteristics
- Size: 160 pc
- Notable features: Difficult detection

Other designations
- Aquarius 2, AQU 2, Aqu ll

Aquarius ll (also Aquarius 2, AQU 2 or Aqu ll) is a mildly elliptical dwarf satellite galaxy to the Milky Way located around 110 kiloparsecs from Earth in the constellation of Aquarius. It has a size of 160 parsecs. Aquarius ll is currently moving away from the galactic center of the Milky Way. This galaxy contains many old red giant branch stars that are predominantly metal poor.

It is located just 9 kiloparsecs from the Large Magellanic Cloud (LMC). Whether this is an association or coincidence is uncertain. Other dwarf galaxies discovered likely do have some association with the Magellanic Clouds.

== Discovery ==
It was discovered using the Very Large Telescope (VLT) and the Sloan Digital Sky Survey (SDSS). When it was found, it was initially identified as an over density of red giant branch stars. Detection of Aquarius ll was difficult as it lies close to the detection boundary of both luminosity and surface brightness,which is why it was not identified earlier and making it one of the most difficult dwarf galaxies to discover.
