= Sextans Dwarf Spheroidal =

Galaxy in the constellation Sextans

Observation data (J2000 epoch)
- Constellation: Sextans
- Right ascension: 10^{h} 13^{m} 02.9^{s}
- Declination: −01° 36′ 53″
- Redshift: 224 ± 2 km/s
- Distance: 290 ± 30 kly (90 ± 10 kpc)
- Apparent magnitude (V): 10.4

Characteristics
- Type: dSph
- Apparent size (V): 30.0′ × 12.0′
- Notable features: satellite galaxy of the Milky Way

Other designations
- Sextans I, LEDA 88608

The Sextans Dwarf Spheroidal is a dwarf spheroidal galaxy that was discovered in 1990 by Mike Irwin, Peter Bunclark, Mick Bridgeland and Richard McMahon as the 8th satellite of the Milky Way, located in the constellation of Sextans. It is also an elliptical galaxy, and displays a redshift because it is receding from the Sun at 224 km/s (72 km/s from the Galaxy). The distance to the galaxy is 320,000 light-years and the diameter is 8,400 light-years along its major axis.

Like other dwarf spheroidal galaxies, the Sextans Dwarf's population consists of old, metal-poor stars: one study found that the majority of stars have a metallicity between [Fe/H] = −3.2 and −1.4. An analysis of several stars found them to also be deficient in barium, except for one star.
