= M94 Group =

Galaxy cluster in the constellations Coma Berenices and Canes Venatici

Observation data (Epoch J2000)
- Constellation(s): Canes Venatici & Coma Berenices
- Right ascension
- Declination
- Brightest member: M94, M106,
- Number of galaxies: 16–24

Other designations
- NGC 4736 Group, Canes Venatici I Group, Canes Venatici Cloud, LGG 290/291, NOGG H 617, NOGG P1 636, NOGG P2 647

The M94 Group (Canes I Group or Canes Venatici I Group) is a loose, extended group of galaxies located about 13 million light-years away in the constellations Canes Venatici and Coma Berenices. The group is one of many groups that lies within the Virgo Supercluster (i.e. the Local Supercluster) and one of the closest groups to the Local Group. The group lies within within Coma–Sculptor Cloud.

Although the galaxies in this cluster appear to be from a single large cloud-like structure, many of the galaxies within the group are only weakly gravitationally bound, and some have not yet formed stable orbits around the center of this group. Instead, most of the galaxies in this group appear to be moving with the expansion of the universe.

== Members ==
The table below lists galaxies that have been consistently identified as group members in the Nearby Galaxies Catalog, the Lyons Groups of Galaxies (LGG) Catalog, and the three group lists created from the Nearby Optical Galaxy sample of Giuricin et al.

Members of the M94 Group
Name	Type	R.A. (J2000)	Dec. (J2000)	Redshift (km/s)	Apparent Magnitude
IC 3687	IAB(s)m	12^{h} 42^{m} 15.1^{s}	+38° 30′ 12″	354 ± 1	13.7
IC 4182	SA(s)m	13^{h} 05^{m} 49.5^{s}	+37° 36′ 18″	321 ± 1	13.0
M94	(R)SA(r)ab	12^{h} 50^{m} 53.0^{s}	+41° 07′ 14″	308 ± 1	9.0
NGC 4144	SAB(s)cd	12^{h} 09^{m} 58.6^{s}	+46° 27′ 26″	265 ± 1	12.1
NGC 4190	Im pec	12^{h} 13^{m} 44.8^{s}	+36° 38′ 03″	228 ± 1	13.4
NGC 4214	IAB(s)m	12^{h} 15^{m} 39.2^{s}	+36° 19′ 37″	291 ± 3	10.2
NGC 4244	SA(s)cd	12^{h} 17^{m} 29.6^{s}	+37° 48′ 26″	244	10.9
NGC 4395	SA(s)m	12^{h} 25^{m} 48.9^{s}	+33° 32′ 48″	319 ± 1	10.6
NGC 4449	IBm	12^{h} 28^{m} 11.9^{s}	+44° 05′ 40″	207 ± 4	10.0
UGC 6817	Im	11^{h} 50^{m} 53.0^{s}	+38° 52′ 49″	242 ± 1	13.4
UGC 7559	IBm	12^{h} 27^{m} 05.2^{s}	+37° 08′ 33″	218 ± 5	14.2
UGC 7577	Im	12^{h} 27^{m} 40.9^{s}	+43° 29′ 44″	195	12.8
UGC 7698	Im	12^{h} 32^{m} 54.4^{s}	+31° 32′ 28″	331 ± 1	13.0
M64	SABa	12^{h} 56^{m} 43.7^{s}	+21° 40’ 57”	408 ± 4	9.36
UGC 8320	IBm	13^{h} 14^{m} 27.9^{s}	+45° 55′ 09″	192 ± 1	12.7

Additionally, NGC 4105 and DDO 169 are frequently but not consistently identified as members of this group in the references cited above.

The brightest member in this galaxy group is questionable and partly depends on the analysis used to determine group members. The LGG Catalog identifies M106 as part of this group, which would make it the brightest galaxy within the group. However, the other catalogs cited above do not identify M106 as a group member, in which case M94 would be the brightest galaxy within the group.

M64 is thought to be located in the group as an isolated member.

== Canes Venatici Cloud ==
This galaxy group is sometimes erroneously called the Canes Venatici Cloud, a larger structure of which it is a member. A galaxy cloud is a supercluster substructure. The CVn Cloud used in this manner is identified by Tully and de Vaucoleurs.

== See also ==
- M96 Group
- Sculptor Group
- Canes II Group (CVn II Group)
