= Mass-to-light ratio =

Ratio of total mass of a galaxy or cluster to its luminosity

In astrophysics and physical cosmology, the mass-to-light ratio, normally designated with the Greek letter upsilon, ϒ, is the quotient between the total mass of a spatial volume (typically on the scales of a galaxy or a cluster) and its luminosity.

These ratios are calculated relative to the Sun as a baseline ratio which is a constant ϒ_{☉} = 5133 kg/W: equal to the solar mass M_{☉} divided by the solar luminosity L_{☉}, M_{☉}/L_{☉}. The mass-to-light ratios of galaxies and clusters are all much greater than ϒ_{☉} due in part to the fact that most of the matter in these objects does not reside within stars and observations suggest that a large fraction is present in the form of dark matter.

Luminosities are obtained from photometric observations, correcting the observed brightness of the object for the distance dimming and extinction effects. In general, unless a complete spectrum of the radiation emitted by the object is obtained, a model must be extrapolated through either power law or blackbody fits. The luminosity thus obtained is known as the bolometric luminosity.

Masses are often calculated from the dynamics of the virialized system or from gravitational lensing. Masses can also be measured through CMB backlighting. Typical mass-to-light ratios for galaxies range from 2 to 10 ϒ_{☉} while on the largest scales, the mass to light ratio of the observable universe is approximately 100 ϒ_{☉}, in concordance with the current best fit cosmological model.

Mass-to-light ratios in application can be used to gain insight into the dark matter content and dust extinction in a galaxy. Historically, rotation curves for spiral galaxies have been used to study galaxies, but mass-to-light ratios prove more accurate as a method of measuring mass.

== See also ==
- Mass–luminosity relation
