= Dwarf spheroidal galaxy =

Low-luminosity galaxy of old stars and little dust

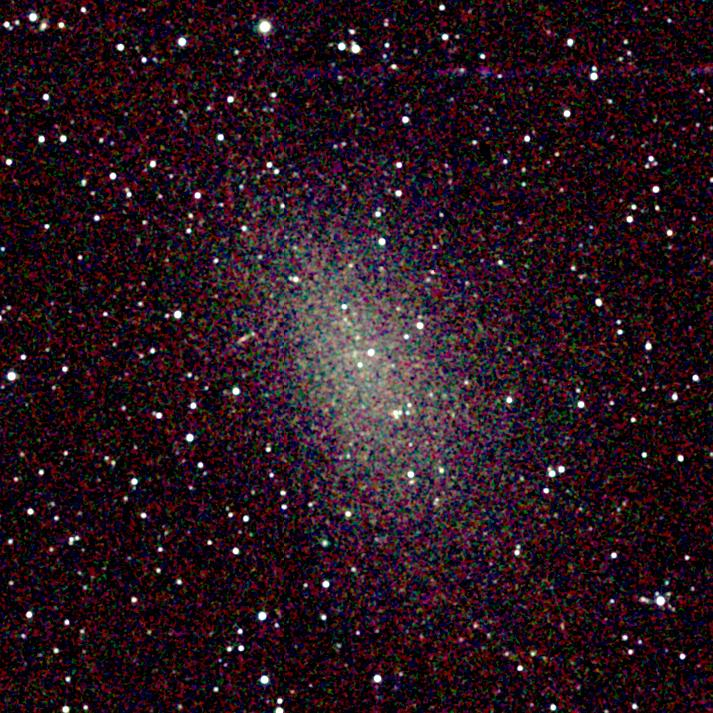
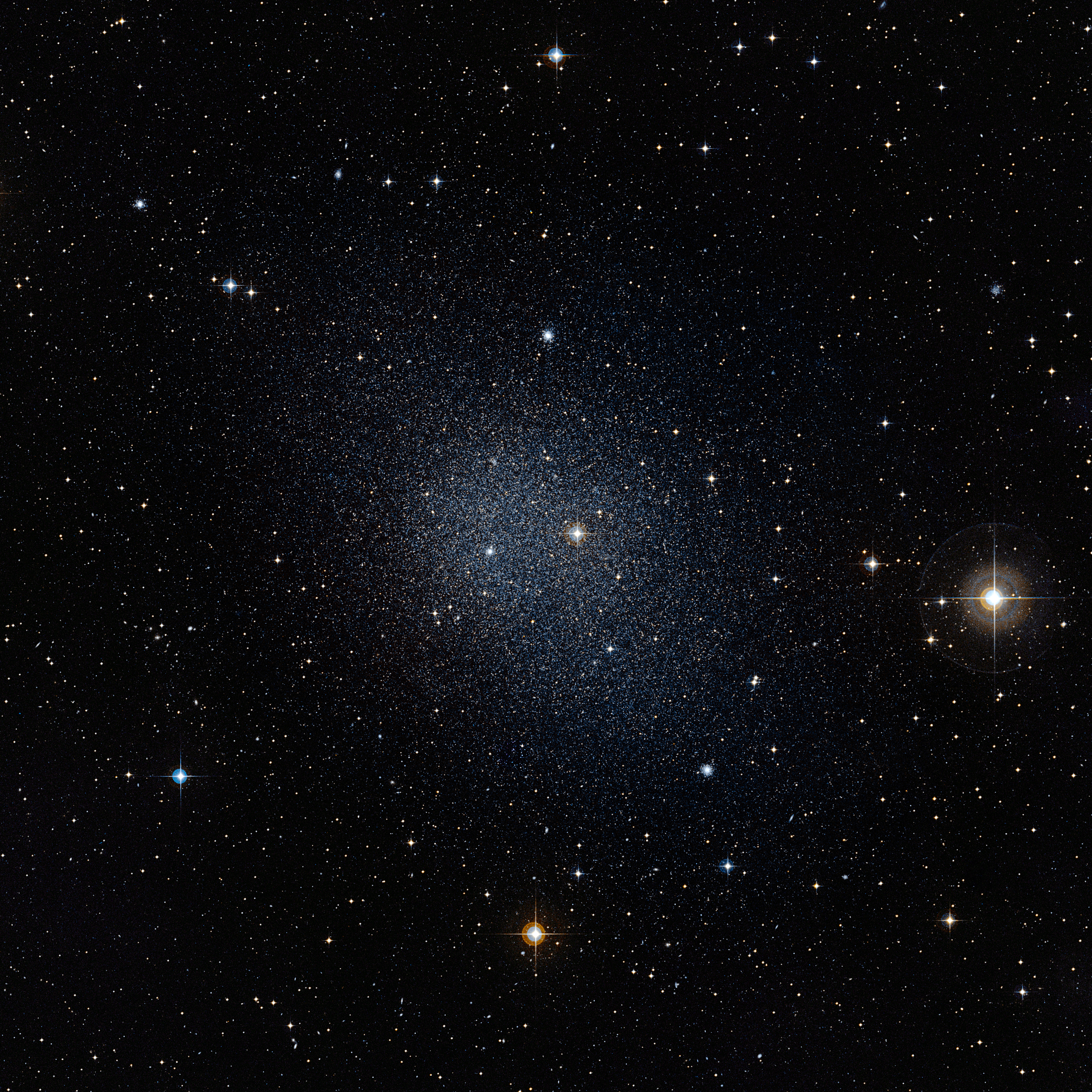
NGC147 (left) and the Fornax Dwarf (right), two of the earliest known dwarf spheroidal galaxies.

A dwarf spheroidal galaxy (dSph) is a term in astronomy applied to small, low-luminosity galaxies with very little dust and an older stellar population. They are found in the Local Group as companions to the Milky Way and as systems that are companions to the Andromeda Galaxy (M31). While similar to dwarf elliptical galaxies in appearance and properties such as little to no gas or dust or recent star formation, they are approximately spheroidal in shape and generally have lower luminosity.

== Discovery ==
Despite the radii of dSphs being much larger than those of globular clusters, they are much more difficult to find due to their low luminosities and surface brightnesses. Dwarf spheroidal galaxies have a large range of luminosities, and known dwarf spheroidal galaxies span several orders of magnitude of luminosity. Their luminosities are so low that Ursa Minor, Carina, and Draco, the known dwarf spheroidal galaxies with the lowest luminosities, have mass-to-light ratios (M/L) greater than that of the Milky Way. Dwarf spheroidals also have little to no gas with no obvious signs of recent star formation. Within the Local Group, dSphs are primarily found near the Milky Way and M31.

The first dwarf spheroidal galaxies discovered were Sculptor and Fornax in 1938. The Sloan Digital Sky Survey has resulted in the discovery of 11 more dSph galaxies as of 2007 By 2015, many more ultra-faint dSphs were discovered, all satellites of the Milky Way. Nine potentially new dSphs were discovered in the Dark Energy Survey in 2015. Each dSph is named after constellations they are discovered in, such as the Sagittarius dwarf spheroidal galaxy, all of which consist of stars generally much older than 1–2 Gyr that formed over the span of many gigayears.

For example, 98% of the stars in the Carina dwarf spheroidal galaxy are older than 2 Gyr, formed over the course of three bursts around 3, 7 and 13 Gyr ago. The stars in Carina have also been found to be metal-poor. This is unlike star clusters because, while star clusters have stars which formed more or less the same time, dwarf spheroidal galaxies experience multiple bursts of star formation.

== Evidence of dark matter ==
Because of the faintness of the lowest-luminosity dwarf spheroidal galaxies and the nature of the stars contained within them, some astronomers suggest that dwarf spheroidal galaxies and globular clusters may not be clearly separate and distinct types of objects. Other recent studies, however, have found a distinction in that the total amount of mass inferred from the motions of stars in dwarf spheroidals is many times that which can be accounted for by the mass of the stars themselves. Studies reveal that dwarf spheroidal galaxies have a dynamical mass of around 10^{7} M_{☉}, which is very large despite the low luminosity of dSph galaxies.

Although at fainter luminosities of dwarf spheroidal galaxies, it is not universally agreed upon how to differentiate between a dwarf spheroidal galaxy and a star cluster; however, many astronomers decide this depending on the object's dynamics: If it seems to have more dark matter, then it is likely that it is a dwarf spheroidal galaxy rather than an enormous, faint star cluster. In the current predominantly accepted Lambda cold dark matter cosmological model, the presence of dark matter is often cited as a reason to classify dwarf spheroidal galaxies as a different class of object from globular clusters, which show little to no signs of dark matter. Because of the extremely large amounts of dark matter in dwarf spheroidal galaxies, they may deserve the title "most dark matter-dominated galaxies."

Further evidence of the prevalence of dark matter in dSphs includes the case of Fornax dwarf spheroidal galaxy, which can be assumed to be in dynamic equilibrium to estimate mass and amount of dark matter, since the gravitational effects of the Milky Way are small. Unlike the Fornax galaxy, there is evidence that the UMa2, a dwarf spheroidal galaxy in the constellation Ursa Major, experiences strong tidal disturbances from the Milky Way.

A topic of research is how much the internal dynamics of dwarf spheroidal galaxies are affected by the gravitational tidal dynamics of the galaxy they are orbiting. In other words, dwarf spheroidal galaxies could be prevented from achieving equilibrium due to the gravitational field of the Milky Way or other galaxy that they orbit. For example, the Sextans dwarf spheroidal galaxy has a velocity dispersion of 7.9±1.3 km/s, which is a velocity dispersion that could not be explained solely by its stellar mass according to the Virial Theorem. Similar to Sextans, previous studies of Hercules dwarf spheroidal galaxy reveal that its orbital path does not correspond to the mass contained in Hercules.
