= Sculptor (disambiguation) =

A sculptor is an artist who specializes in sculpture.

Sculptor may also refer to:

== In astronomy ==
- Sculptor (constellation), a constellation in the southern sky. Several astronomical features located within the constellation share its name.
  - The Sculptor Group of galaxies, including:
    - Sculptor Galaxy, a spiral galaxy.
    - Sculptor Dwarf Irregular Galaxy.
  - Sculptor Dwarf Galaxy, a dwarf spheroidal galaxy and satellite galaxy of the Milky Way, not part of the Sculptor Group.
  - The Sculptor Wall, a supercluster of more distant galaxies.

== Other uses ==
- The Sculptor Squirrel, a species of Malaysian rodent.
- The Sculptor, a graphic novel by American cartoonist Scott McCloud
- The USS Sculptor (AK-103), a cargo ship formerly part of the United States Navy
