= Sculptor Galaxy =

Intermediate spiral galaxy in the constellation Sculptor

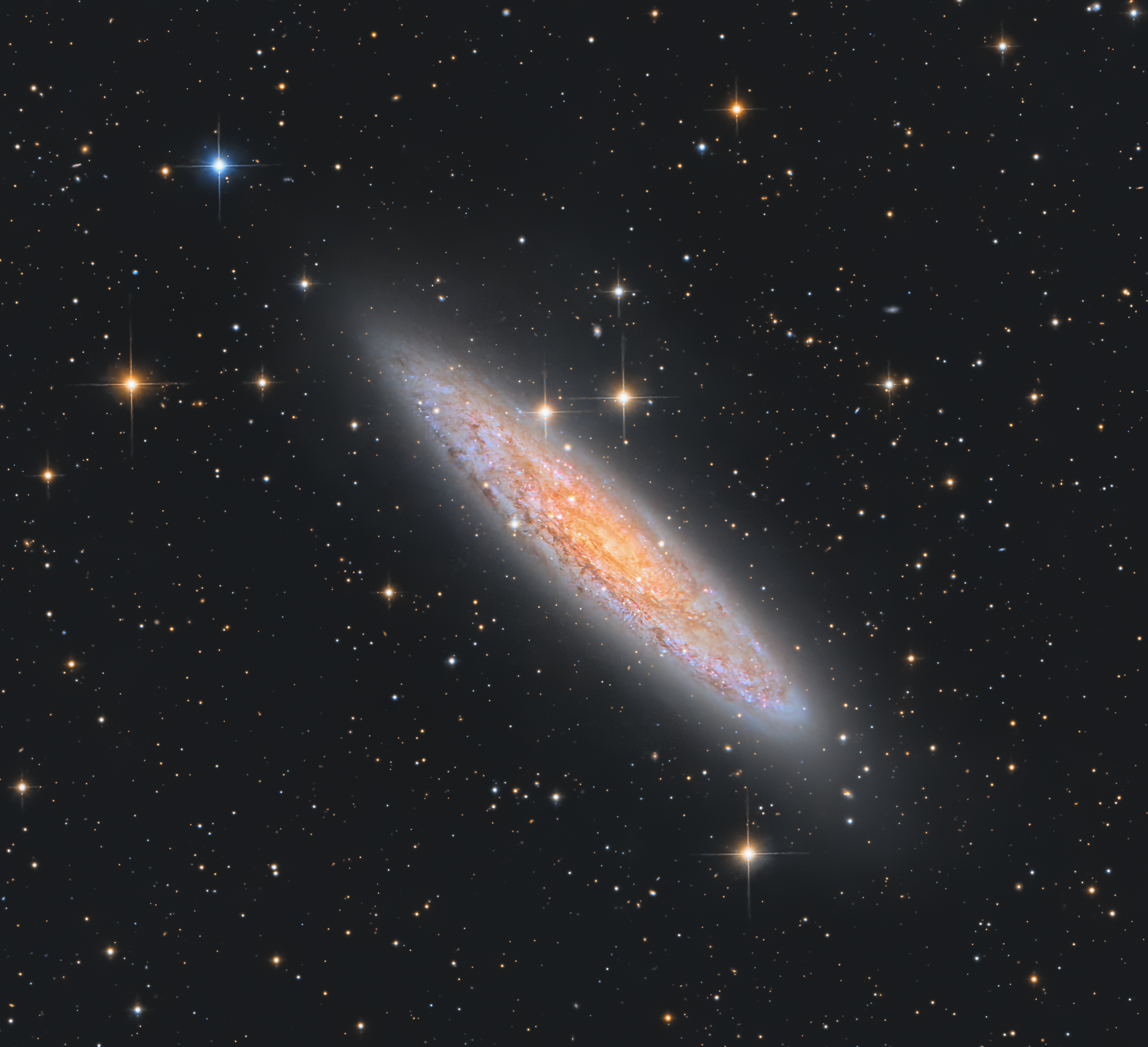
- The Sculptor Galaxy is particularly known for its exceptionally high rate of star formation

Observation data (J2000 epoch)
- Constellation: Sculptor
- Right ascension: 00^{h} 47^{m} 33.13^{s}
- Declination: −25° 17′ 17.1″
- Redshift: 0.000807
- Heliocentric radial velocity: 242 ± 1 km/s
- Distance: 11.4 ± 0.7 Mly (3.5 ± 0.2 Mpc)
- Apparent magnitude (V): 8.0

Characteristics
- Type: SAB(s)c
- Size: 36.96 kiloparsecs (120,500 light-years) (diameter; D_{27} isophote)
- Apparent size (V): 27′.5 × 6′.8

Other designations
- Silver Coin Galaxy, Silver Dollar Galaxy, NGC 253, UGCA 13, PGC 2789 Caldwell 65

The Sculptor Galaxy (also known as the Silver Coin Galaxy, Silver Dollar Galaxy, NGC 253, or Caldwell 65) is an intermediate spiral galaxy in the constellation Sculptor. The Sculptor Galaxy is a starburst galaxy, which means that it is currently undergoing a period of intense star formation.

== Observation ==
=== Observational history ===
The galaxy was discovered by Caroline Herschel in 1783 during one of her systematic comet searches. Many years later, John Herschel observed it using his 18-inch metallic mirror reflector at the Cape of Good Hope. He wrote: "very bright and large (24′ in length); a superb object.... Its light is somewhat streaky, but I see no stars in it except 4 large and one very small one, and these seem not to belong to it, there being many near..."

In 1961, Allan Sandage wrote in the Hubble Atlas of Galaxies that the Sculptor Galaxy is "the prototype example of a special subgroup of Sc systems....photographic images of galaxies of the group are dominated by the dust pattern. Dust lanes and patches of great complexity are scattered throughout the surface. Spiral arms are often difficult to trace.... The arms are defined as much by the dust as by the spiral pattern." Bernard Y. Mills, working out of Sydney, discovered that the Sculptor Galaxy is also a fairly strong radio source.

In 1998, the Hubble Space Telescope took a detailed image of NGC 253.

=== Amateur ===
As one of the brightest galaxies in the sky, the Sculptor Galaxy can be seen through binoculars and is near the star Beta Ceti. It is considered one of the most easily viewed spiral galaxies in the sky after the Andromeda Galaxy.

The Sculptor Galaxy is a good target for observation with a telescope with a 300 mm diameter or larger. In such telescopes, it appears as a galaxy with a long, oval bulge and a mottled galactic disc. Although the bulge appears only slightly brighter than the rest of the galaxy, it is fairly extended compared to the disk. In 400 mm scopes and larger, a dark dust lane northwest of the nucleus is visible, and over a dozen faint stars can be seen superimposed on the bulge. Some people claim to have observed the galaxy with the unaided eye under exceptional viewing conditions.

== Features ==
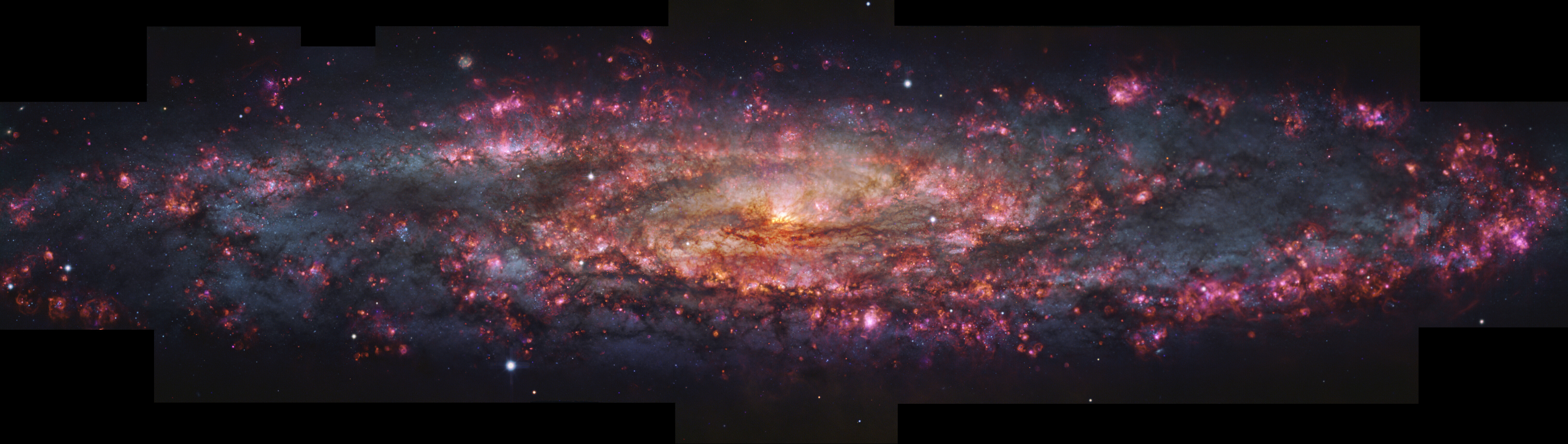
The Sculptor Galaxy as seen by the MUSE instrument at the Very Large Telescope.

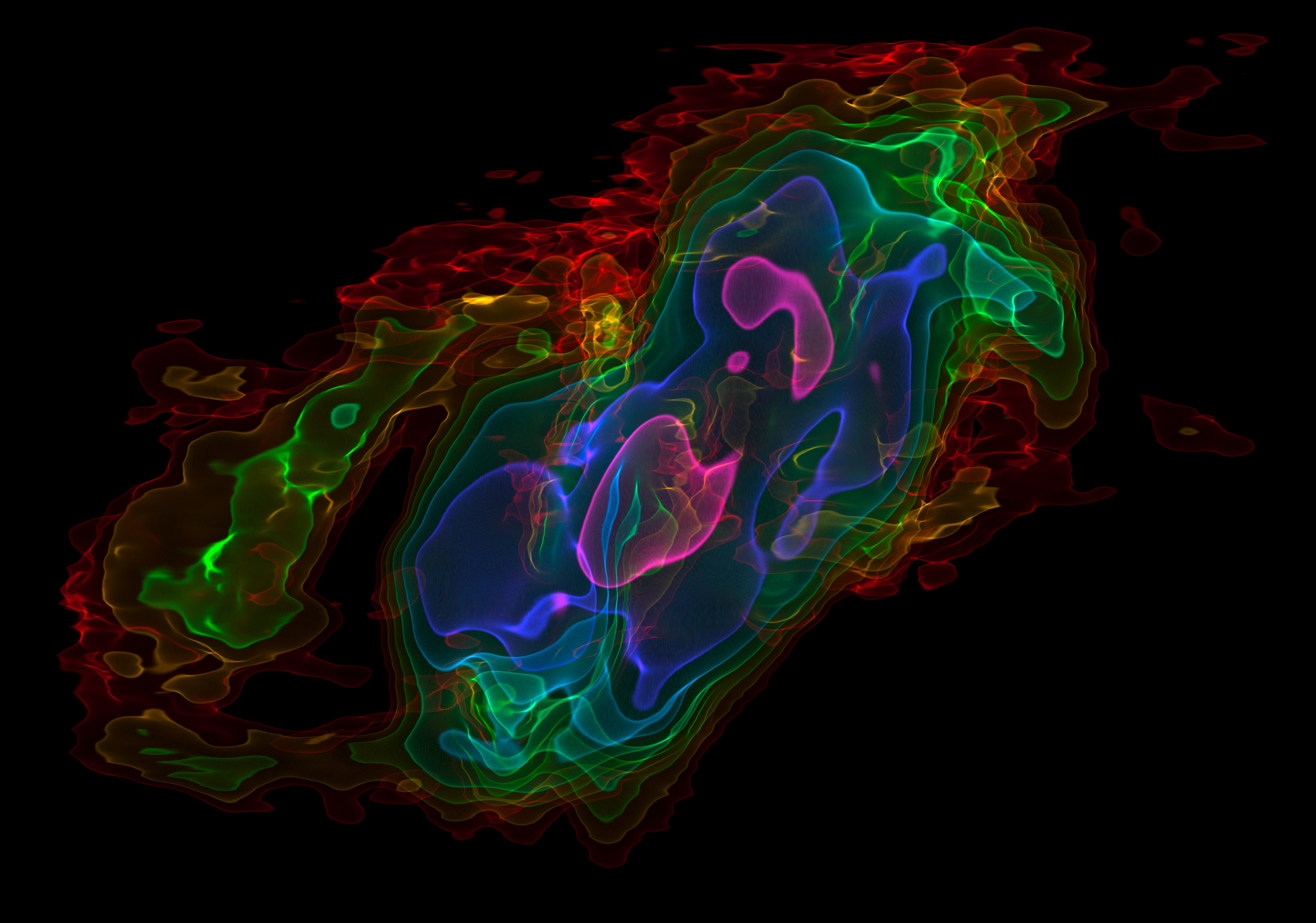
Three-dimensional simulation of ALMA observations of the outflows.

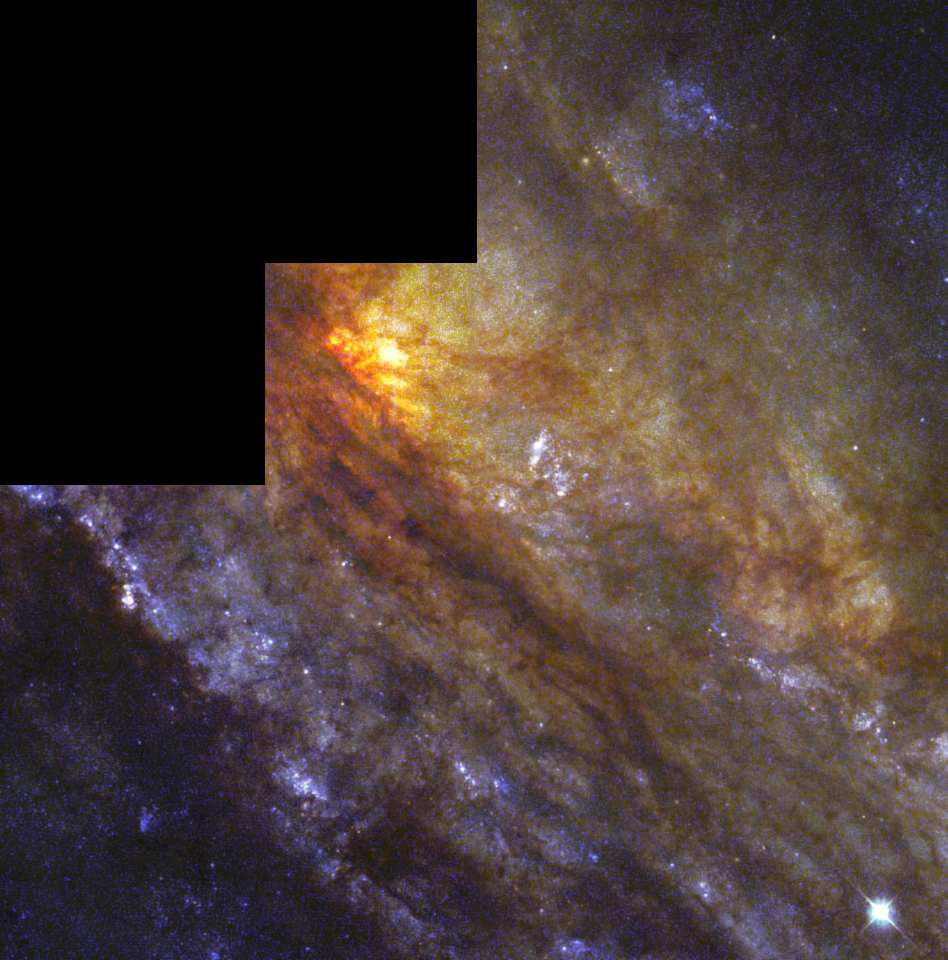
Detail of NGC 253 by Hubble Space Telescope. (Credit: HST/NASA/ESA).

The Sculptor Galaxy is located at the center of the Sculptor Group, one of the nearest groups of galaxies to the Milky Way. It is the brightest galaxy in the group and one of the intrinsically brightest galaxies in our vicinity, only surpassed by the Andromeda Galaxy and the Sombrero Galaxy. The Sculptor Galaxy and the companion galaxies NGC 247, PGC 2881, PGC 2933, Sculptor-dE1, and UGCA 15 form a gravitationally-bound core near the center of the group. Most other galaxies associated with the Sculptor Group are only weakly gravitationally bound to this core.

=== Starburst ===
NGC 253's starburst has created several super star clusters on NGC 253's center (discovered with the aid of the Hubble Space Telescope): one with a mass of 1.5×10^{6} solar masses, and absolute magnitude of at least −15, and two others with 5×10^{4} solar masses and absolute magnitudes around −11; later studies have discovered an even more massive cluster heavily obscured by NGC 253's interstellar dust with a mass of 1.4×10^{7} solar masses, an age of around 5.7×10^{6} years, and rich in Wolf–Rayet stars. The super star clusters are arranged in an ellipse around the center of NGC 253, which from the Earth's perspective appears as a flat line.

Star formation is also high in the northeast of NGC 253's disk, where a number of red supergiant stars can be found, and in its halo there are young stars as well as some amounts of neutral hydrogen. This, along with other peculiarities found in NGC 253, suggest that a gas-rich dwarf galaxy collided with it 200 million years ago, disturbing its disk and starting the present starburst.

As happens in other galaxies suffering strong star formation such as Messier 82, NGC 4631, or NGC 4666, the stellar winds of the massive stars produced in the starburst as well as their deaths as supernovae have blown out material to NGC 253's halo in the form of a superwind that seems to be inhibiting star formation in the galaxy.

=== Novae and Supernovae ===
Although supernovae are generally associated with starburst galaxies, only one has been detected within the Sculptor Galaxy. SN 1940E (type unknown, mag. 14.5) was discovered by Fritz Zwicky on 22 November 1940, located approximately 54″ southwest of the galaxy's nucleus.

NGC 253 is close enough that classical novae can also be detected. The first confirmed nova in this galaxy was discovered by BlackGEM at magnitude 19.6 on 12 July 2024, and designated AT 2024pid.

=== Central black hole ===
Research suggests the presence of a supermassive black hole in the center of this galaxy with a mass estimated to be 5 million times that of the Sun, which is slightly heavier than Sagittarius A*.

=== Distance estimates ===
At least two techniques have been used to measure distances to Sculptor in the past ten years.

Using the planetary nebula luminosity function (PNLF) method, an estimate of 10.89 ^{+0.85}_{−1.24} million light years (or Mly; 3.34 ^{+0.26}_{−0.38} Megaparsecs, or Mpc) was achieved in 2005.

The Sculptor Galaxy is close enough that the TRGB method may also be used to estimate its distance. The estimated distance to Sculptor using this technique in 2004 yielded 12.8±1.2 Mly (3.94±0.37 Mpc).

A weighted average of the most reliable distance estimates gives a distance of 11.4±0.7 Mly (3.5±0.2 Mpc).

== Satellite galaxies ==
An international team of researchers has used the Subaru Telescope to identify a faint dwarf galaxy disrupted by NGC 253. The satellite galaxy is called NGC 253-dw2 and may not survive its next passage by its much larger host. The host galaxy may suffer some damage too if the dwarf is massive enough. The interplay between the two galaxies is responsible for the disturbance in NGC 253's structure.

Until 2020, 12 satellite galaxies were known to exist within the region of influence of NGC 253: NGC 247, NGC 7793 and its companions PGC 704814 and ESO 349–031, DDO 6, ESO 349-03, ESO 540-032, KDG 2, Sc22, LVJ0055-2310, Scl-MM-Dw1, Scl-MM-Dw2.

In June 2021, the discovery of three new satellite galaxies, named Donatiello II, Donatiello III, and Donatiello IV, was reported by Italian amateur astronomer Giuseppe Donatiello. Donatiello II is the third-closest satellite to NGC 253. Donatiello III, approximately 340,000 parsecs from NGC 253, is one of the outer members of the satellite group. Donatiello IV, along with the irregular dwarf galaxy ESO 540-032, forms a subgroup around NGC 247.

In August 2021, another team of astronomers announced the discovery of three additional new satellite galaxies, designated Scl-MM-dw3, Scl-MM-dw4, and Scl-MM-dw5; however, the object Scl-MM-dw3, as the study authors specified, corresponds to the previously reported Donatiello II. Observed with the Hubble Space Telescope, they are 3.48, 4.10, and 3.90 Mpc away, respectively, and can be classified as ultra-faint dwarf galaxies (UFDs).

Observations with the Hubble Space Telescope also determined the distances of the Donatiello III and Donatiello IV galaxies at 3.37 and 3.94 Mpc, respectively, confirming their membership in the NGC 253 satellite system. The object designated dw0036m2828, estimated at 3.76 Mpc, was also confirmed as belonging to the NGC 253 satellite system. The same study also ruled out the possibility that the dwarf galaxy reported as SculptorSR is in the NGC 253 group, being approximately 19 Mpc away and possibly interacting with NGC 150.

In March 2024, an international team announced the discovery of a new satellite galaxy named NGC253-SNFC-dw1. It is a very diffuse and faint object, revealed using deep stellar photometry obtained as part of the Subaru Near-Field Cosmology Survey using the Hyper Suprime-Cam on the Subaru Telescope. The distance has been estimated at 3.62 Mpc.

In May 2024, the discovery of five more dwarf satellite galaxies was reported, also discovered by Giuseppe Donatiello. In accordance with the nomenclature used, they have been named Donatiello V, Donatiello VI, Donatiello VII, Donatiello VIII, and Donatiello IX. The new discoveries weaken the hypothesis of a coplanar distribution of the satellites.

NGC 59, NGC 625, DDO 226, and UGCA 442 are instead considered to be peripheral galaxies and not related to NGC 253, despite being in the same group.

== See also ==
- Globular cluster NGC 288, located 1.8° south-southeast of the Sculptor Galaxy.
- 2MASX J00482185-2507365 occulting pair, discovered while photographing NGC 253
