= NGC 24 =

Galaxy in the constellation Sculptor

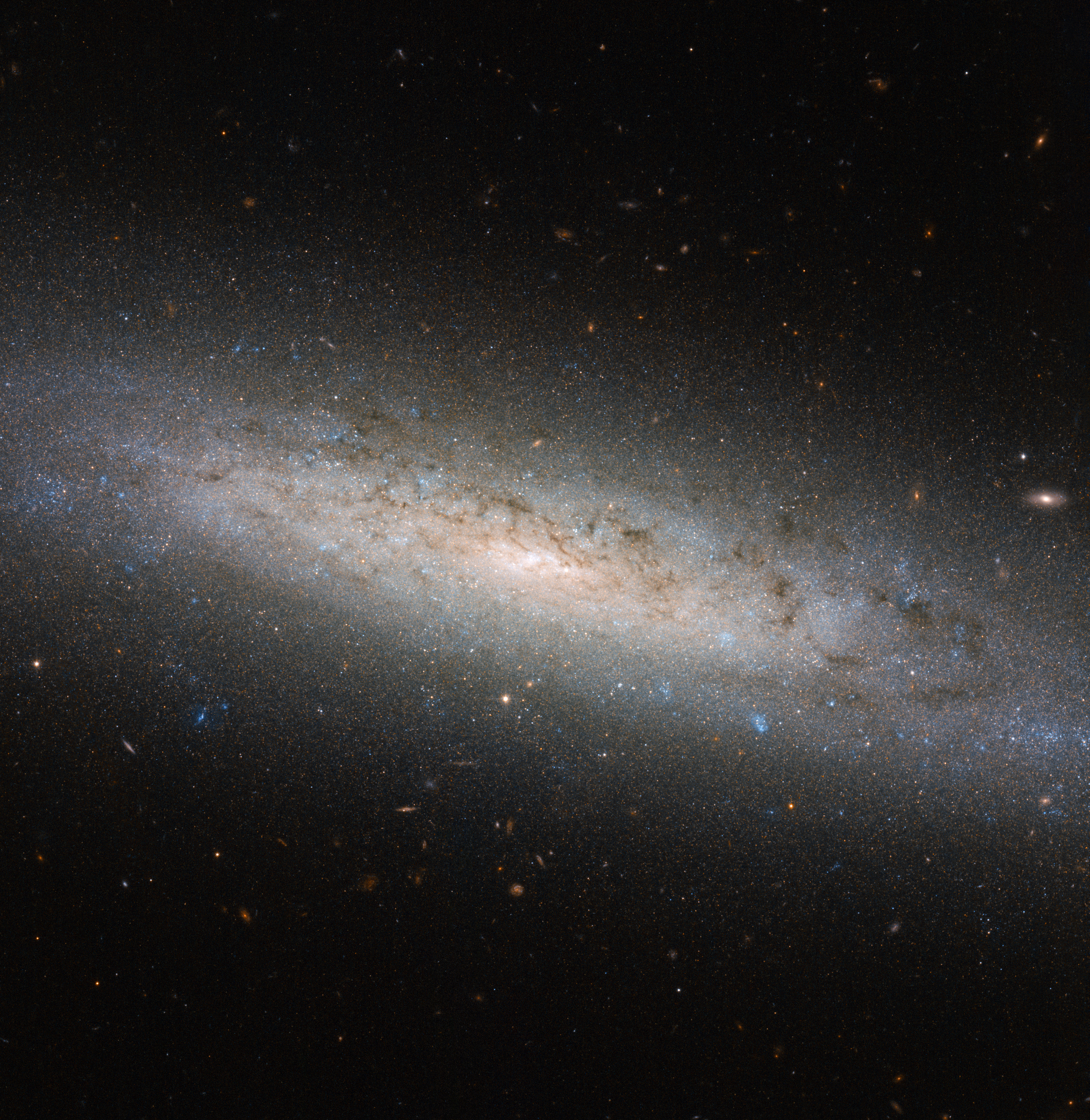
- HST image of NGC 24

Observation data (J2000 epoch)
- Constellation: Sculptor
- Right ascension: 00^{h} 09^{m} 56.542^{s}
- Declination: −24° 57′ 47.27″
- Redshift: 0.00185±0.00001
- Heliocentric radial velocity: 554.017±2.099 km/s
- Distance: 23.8 Mly (7.31 Mpc)
- Apparent magnitude (V): +12.4
- Absolute magnitude (V): −17.61

Characteristics
- Type: SA(s)c
- Apparent size (V): 5.7' x 1.5'

Other designations
- UGCA 2, ESO 472-G016, MCG-04-01-018, ESO-LV 4720160, PGC 701, CGS 119

NGC 24 is a spiral galaxy in the southern constellation of Sculptor, about 23.8 megalight-years distant from the Milky Way. It was discovered by British astronomer William Herschel in 1785, and measures some 40,000 light-years across. The general shape of this galaxy is specified by its morphological classification of SA(s)c, which indicates it is an unbarred spiral with no ring-like structure and moderate to loosely-wound spiral arms. This galaxy is positioned in the vicinity of the Sculptor Group, but is actually a background object that is about two times as distant. It may form a pair with another background galaxy, NGC 45.
