= NGC 7840 =

Galaxy in the constellation Pisces

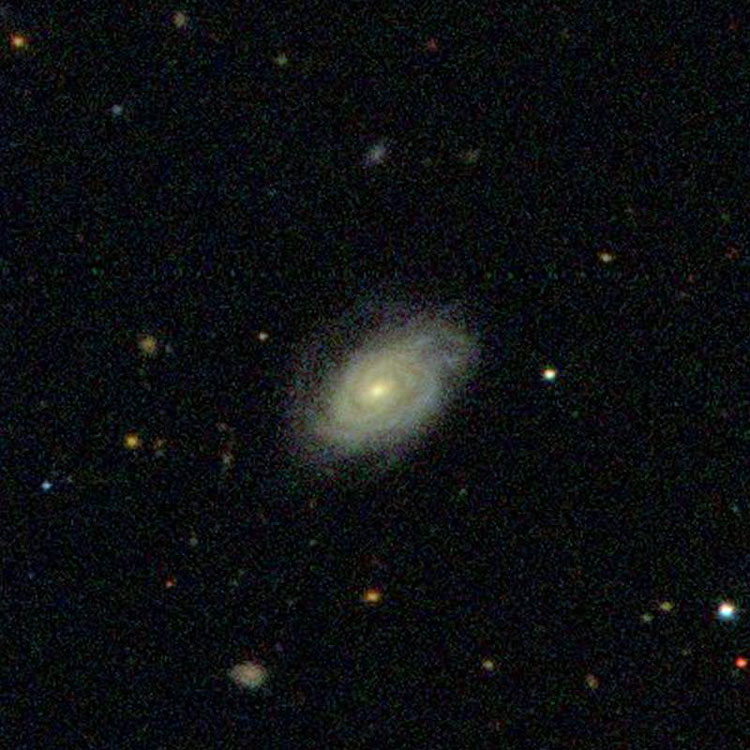
- SDSS image of NGC 7840

Observation data (J2000 epoch)
- Constellation: Pisces
- Right ascension: 00^{h} 07^{m} 08.79^{s}
- Declination: +08° 22′ 59.6″
- Apparent magnitude (V): 15

Characteristics
- Type: S?
- Apparent size (V): 0.676′ × 0.457′

Other designations
- 2MASX J00070878+0822598, PGC 1345780

NGC 7840, the last numerical entry in the New General Catalogue, is an unbarred spiral galaxy in the constellation Pisces. Its velocity with respect to the cosmic microwave background is 10906 ± 49 km/s, which corresponds to a Hubble distance of 160.85 ± 11.30 Mpc (~524 million light-years), and its diameter is about 162,000 light-years. It was discovered by German astronomer Albert Marth on 29 November 1864.

For observing from Earth's surface, it has a magnitude of 15.5 in the early 21st century. One observing guide recommended a telescope with a least 300mm aperture for observations.

== See also ==
- List of NGC objects (7000–7840)

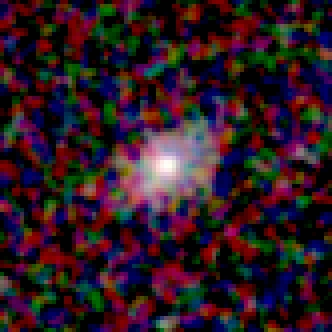
NGC 7840 (2MASS)
