= Sculptor Dwarf Irregular Galaxy =

Irregular galaxy in the constellation Sculptor

Sculptor Dwarf Irregular
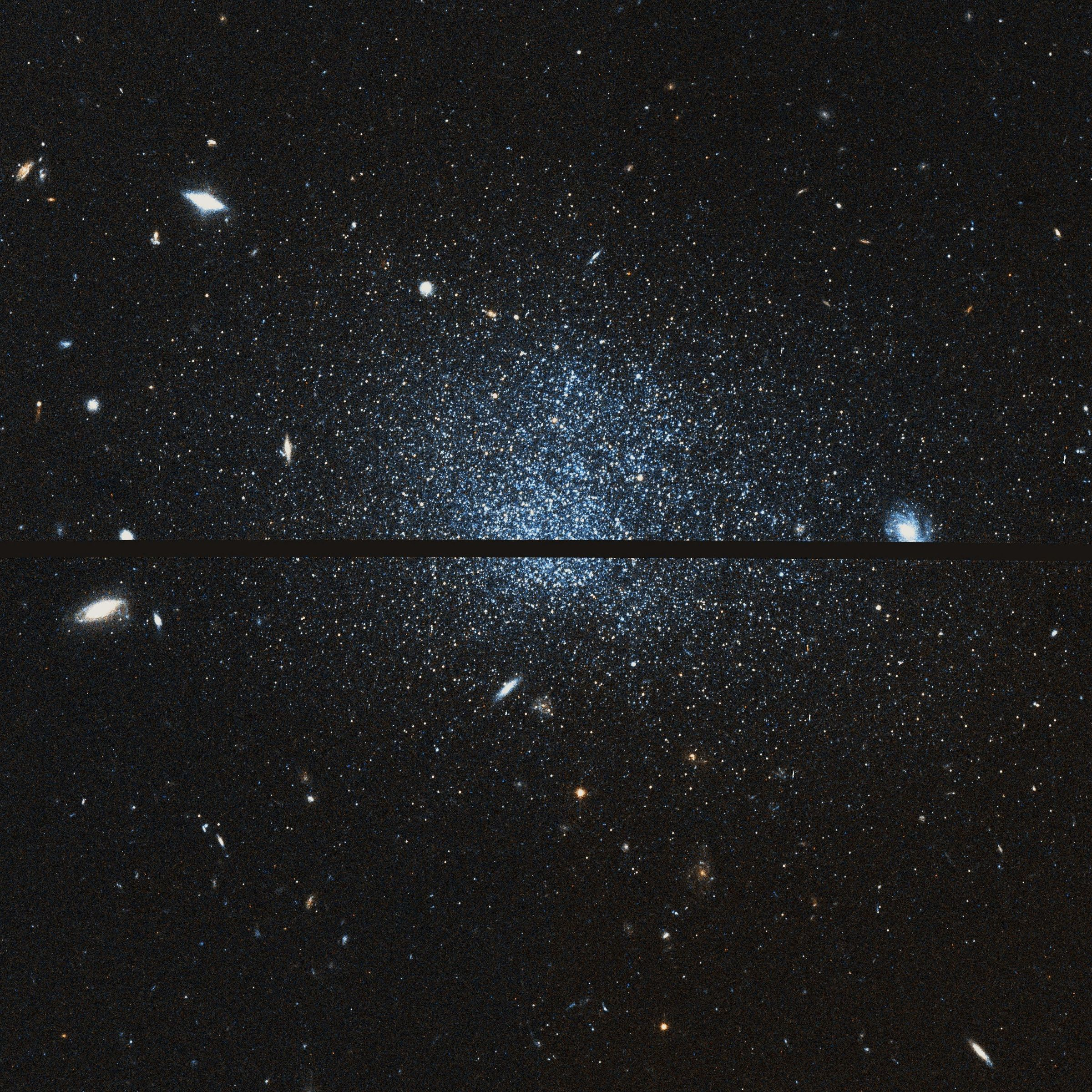
- Sculptor Dwarf Irregular Galaxy close up by Hubble Space Telescope.

Observation data (J2000 epoch)
- Constellation: Sculptor
- Right ascension: 00^{h} 08^{m} 13.36^{s}
- Declination: −34° 34′ 42.0″
- Redshift: 221 ± 6 km/s
- Distance: 10.44 ± 0.33 Mly (3.2 ± 0.1 Mpc)
- Apparent magnitude (V): 15.5
- Absolute magnitude (V): −11.87

Characteristics
- Type: dIrr
- Apparent size (V): 1.1′ × 0.9′
- Half-light radius (apparent): 29″.4 ± 1″.6

Other designations
- SDIG, PGC 621, ESO 349-031

The Sculptor Dwarf Irregular Galaxy (SDIG) is an irregular galaxy in the constellation Sculptor. It is a member of the NGC 7793 subgroup of the Sculptor Group.

== Nearby galaxies and galaxy group information ==
The Sculptor Dwarf Irregular Galaxy and the dwarf galaxy UGCA 442 are both companions of the spiral galaxy NGC 7793. These galaxies all lie within the Sculptor Group, a weakly bound, filament-like group of galaxies located near the Local Group.

== See also ==
- Sculptor Dwarf Galaxy – a dwarf spheroidal or elliptical galaxy, also in Sculptor, but significantly closer; a satellite of the Milky Way.
