= NGC 3326 =

Spiral galaxy

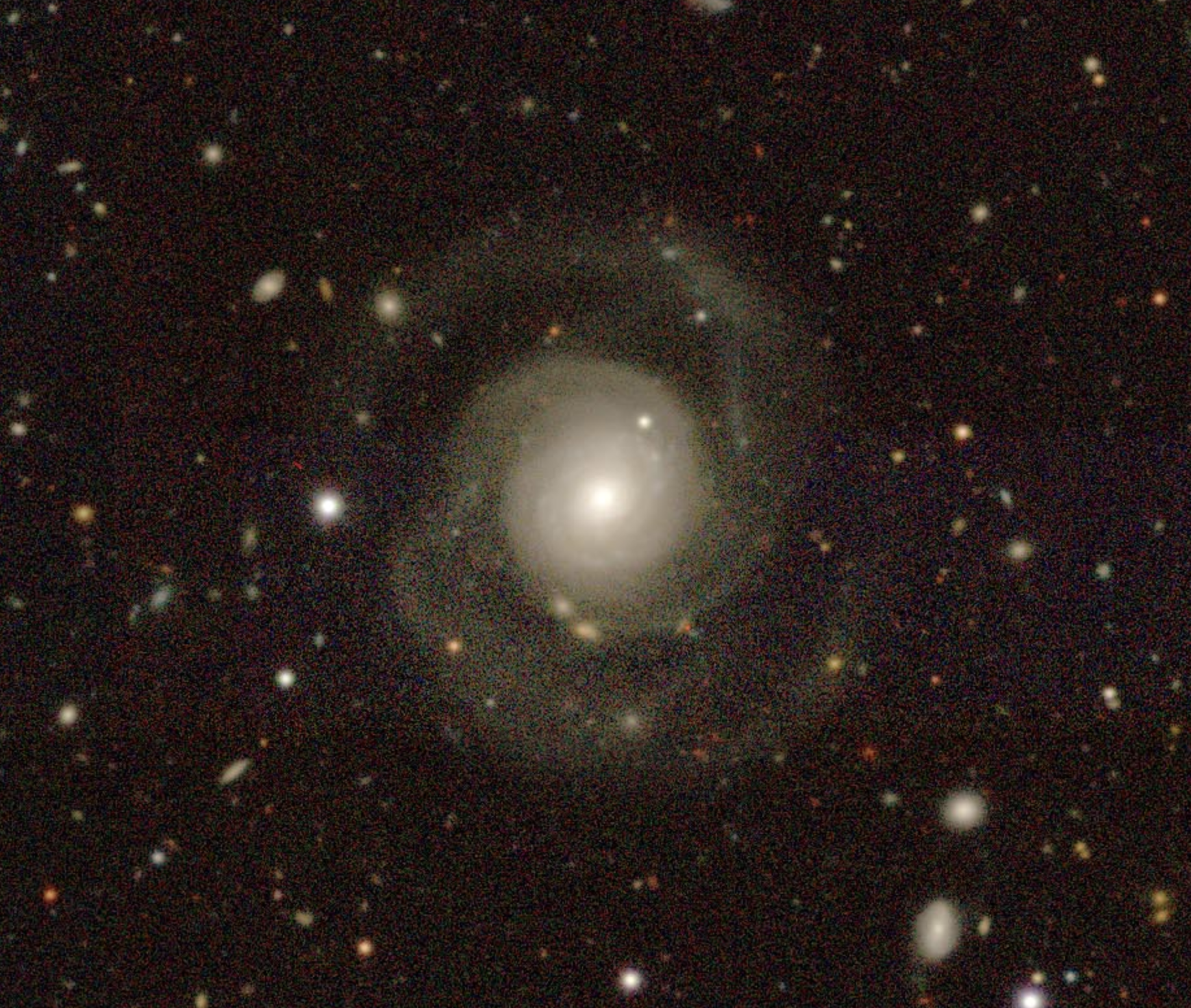

Observation data
- Constellation: Sextans
- Right ascension: 10^{h} 40^{m} 52^{s}
- Declination: +04° 58′ 21″
- Distance: 409,000,000
- Apparent magnitude (V): 14.2

Characteristics
- Type: Unbarred spiral galaxy
- Apparent size (V): 0.97' x 0.87'

Other designations
- LEDA 31701, MCG+01-27-025, Mrk 1260, UGC 5799, GC 5527, PGC 31701

NGC 3326 is an unbarred spiral galaxy in Sextans. It is classified as a type SAa galaxy. It was discovered on March 22, 1865, by Albert Marth. He initially believed it to be a faint star.
