= NGC 825 =

Spiral galaxy in the constellation Cetus

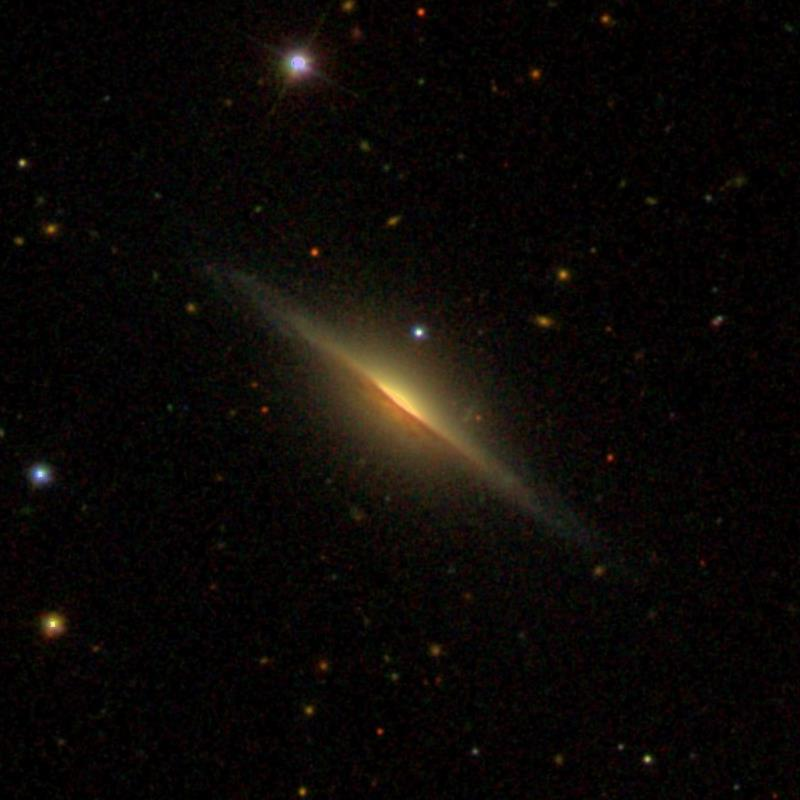
- SDSS image of NGC 825

Observation data (J2000 epoch)
- Constellation: Cetus
- Right ascension: 02^{h} 08^{m} 32.33184^{s}
- Declination: +06° 19′ 24.9764″
- Redshift: 0.011575
- Heliocentric radial velocity: 3450 km/s
- Distance: 271.3 Mly (83.18 Mpc)
- Apparent magnitude (B): 14.5

Characteristics
- Type: SAa

Other designations
- UGC 1636, MCG +01-06-045, PGC 8173

NGC 825 is an unbarred spiral galaxy in the constellation Cetus, estimated to be 154 million light-years away. The object was discovered by the astronomer Albert Marth on November 18, 1863.

NGC 825 is part of a galaxy group known as NGC 825 Group or LGG 47, together with 4 other galaxies, IC 208, IC 1776, UGC 1649 and UGC 1646.

== See also ==
- List of NGC objects (1–1000)
