= NGC 4444 =

Galaxy in the constellation Centaurus

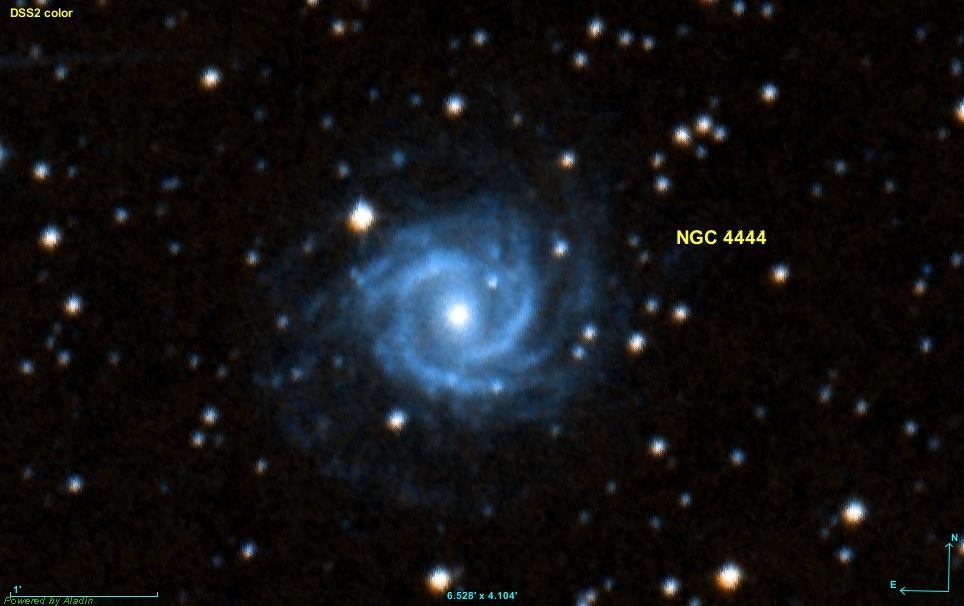
- DSS image of NGC 4444

Observation data (J2000 epoch)
- Constellation: Centaurus
- Right ascension: 12^{h} 28^{m} 36.419^{s}
- Declination: −43° 15′ 42.15″
- Redshift: 0.009771
- Heliocentric radial velocity: 2915 km/s
- Distance: (38.8 ± 5.7 Mpc)

Characteristics
- Type: SAB(rs)bc
- Mass: 5.8 billion M_{☉}
- Apparent size (V): 2′.4 × 1′.6

Other designations
- MCG -07-26-007, PGC 41043

NGC 4444 is an intermediate spiral galaxy in the constellation Centaurus. The morphological classification places it midway on the continuum between a barred spiral (SB) and an unbarred spiral (SA), with an inner region that lies between a ring-like (r) and a purely spiral form (s), and medium- (b) to loosely wound (c) outer spiral arms. This makes it a hybrid ringed, barred spiral galaxy. It has an angular size of 2.4 × 1.6 arcminutes and the estimated mass M is given log M = 9.76, yielding 5.8 billion solar masses.
