= NGC 7793 =

Galaxy in the constellation Sculptor

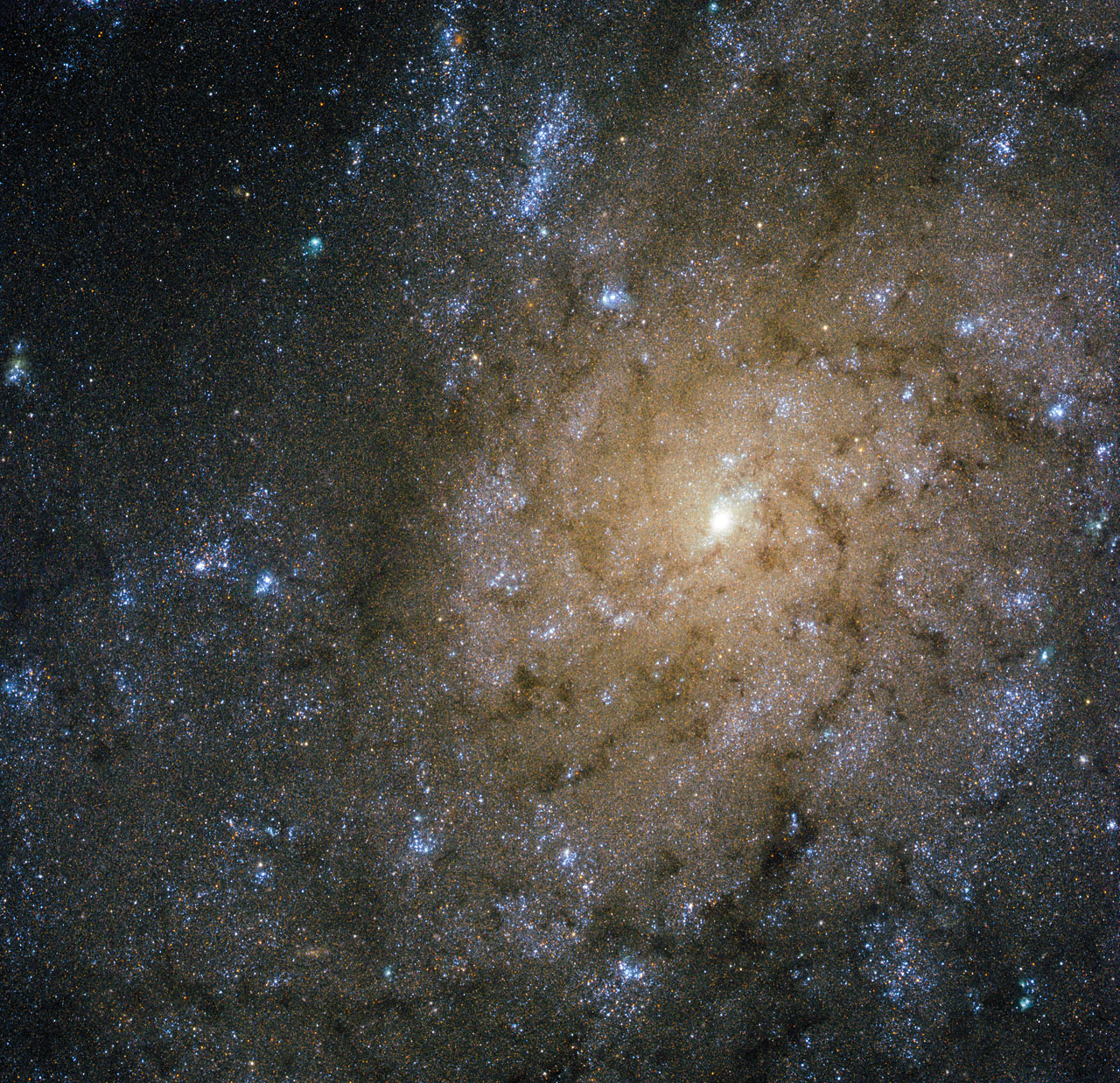
- Hubble Space Telescope image of the small bulge and spiral arms of NGC 7793

Observation data (J2000 epoch)
- Constellation: Sculptor
- Right ascension: 23^{h} 57^{m} 49.753^{s}
- Declination: −32° 35′ 27.71″
- Redshift: 0.000749
- Heliocentric radial velocity: 227 km/s
- Distance: 12.2 Mly (3.7 Mpc)
- Group or cluster: Sculptor Group
- Apparent magnitude (V): 10.0

Characteristics
- Type: SA(s)d
- Mass: Stellar: 3.2×10^{9} M_{☉}
- Size: ~50,900 ly (15.61 kpc) (estimated)
- Apparent size (V): 9.3′ × 6.3′

Other designations
- ESO 349- G 012, IRAS 23552-3252, MCG -06-01-009, PGC 73049

NGC 7793, also known as Bond's Galaxy, is a flocculent spiral galaxy in the southern constellation of Sculptor. It was discovered on July 14, 1826, by Scottish astronomer James Dunlop. The galaxy is located at a distance of 12.2 million light years and is receding with a heliocentric radial velocity of 227 km/s.

NGC 7793 is one of the five brightest galaxies within the Sculptor Group. It is once thought to part of a group known as LGG 4, which has 7 core members, which are NGC 55, NGC 300, ESO 349-31, ESO 351-30, ESO 295-29 and ESO 352-2.

The morphological class of NGC 7793 is SA(s)d, indicating it is unbarred spiral galaxy (SA) with no inner ring structure (s) and the arms are loosely wound and disorganized (d). It is flocculent in appearance with a very small bulge and a star cluster at the nucleus. The galactic disk is inclined at an angle of 53.7° to the line of sight from the Earth. The visible profile is elliptical in form with an angular size of 9.3′ × 6.3′ and a major axis aligned along a position angle of 99.3°. There are two nearby dwarf galaxy companions.

NGC 7793 hosts the ultra-luminous X-ray pulsar (ULXP) referred to as NGC 7793 P13 (previously believed to harbor a black hole), which consists of a 0.42-second pulsar in a 64-day orbit with a 18–23 solar mass B9Ia companion star.

== Supernova ==
One supernova has been observed in NGC 7793. SN 2008bk (Type II-P, mag. 12.6) was discovered by Berto Monard (bio-it) on March 25, 2008. It reached apparent magnitude 12.5, making it the second-brightest supernova of 2008. The progenitor of this supernova was a red supergiant, observed only 547 days prior to the explosion.

== Gallery ==
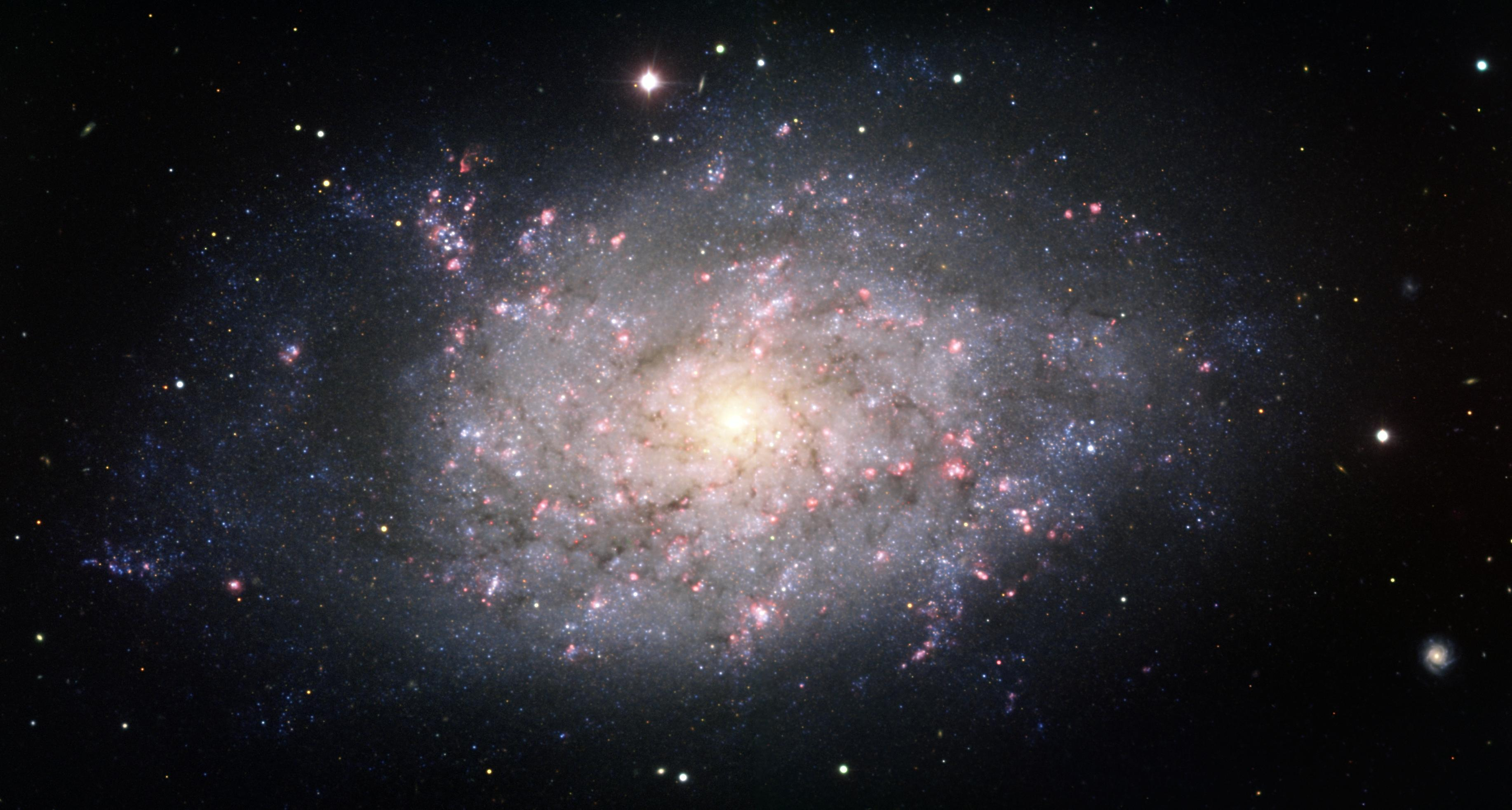
Visual and infrared image of NGC 7793

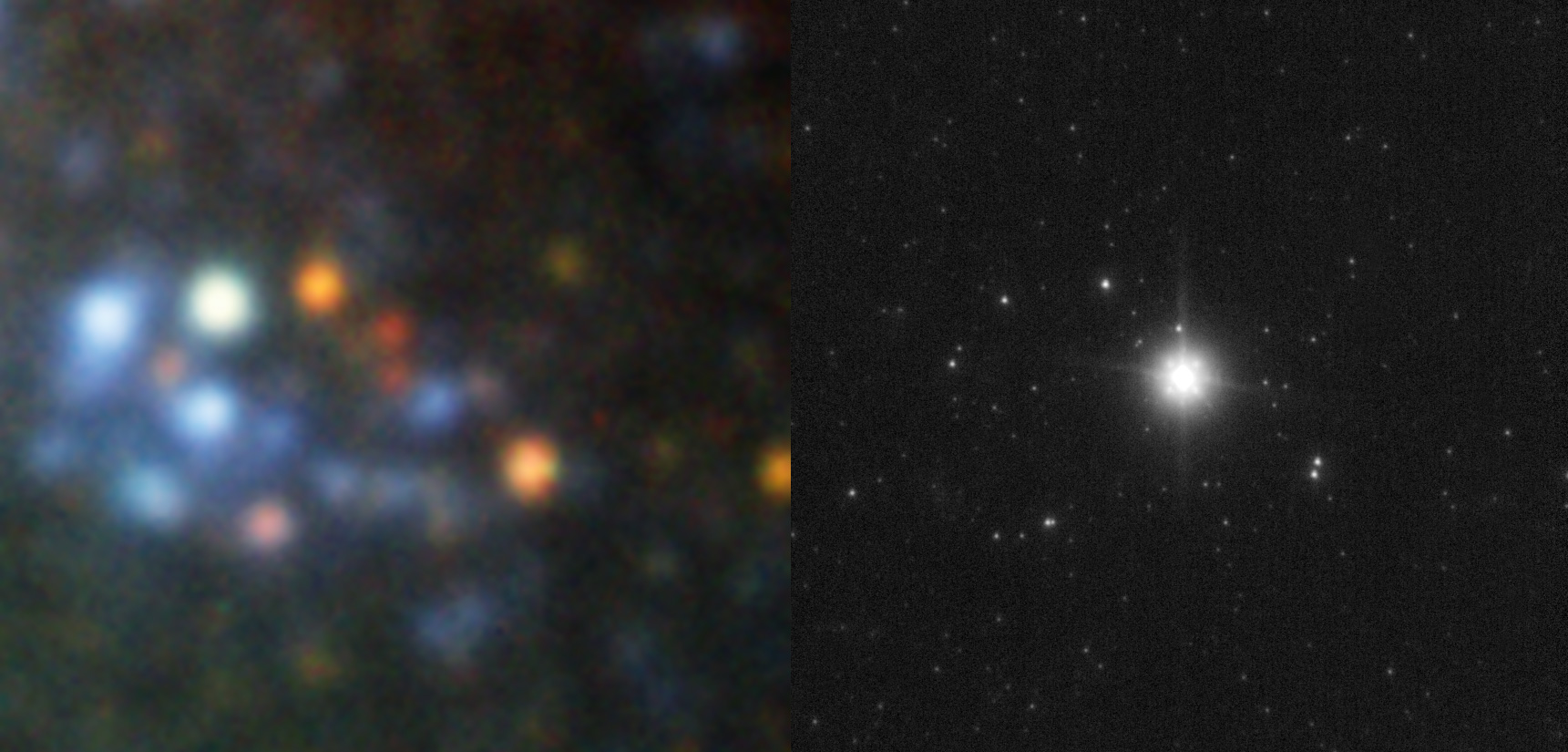
SN 2008bk before it exploded (left) and after the explosion (right)

== See also ==
- List of NGC objects (7001–7840)
- NGC 300 – a similar spiral galaxy that is near NGC 7793
- NGC 2403 – a similar spiral galaxy
