= 6dFGS gJ050159.7−144314 =

Barred spiral galaxy in Lepus constellation

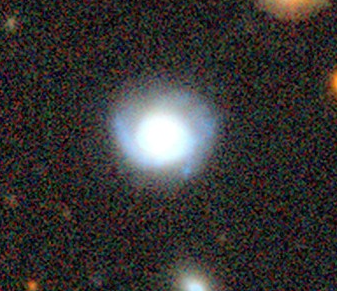

Observation data (J2000 epoch)
- Constellation: Lepus
- Right ascension: 05^{h} 01^{m} 59.7186051552^{s}
- Declination: −14° 43′ 14.448730116″
- Redshift: 0.04552
- Heliocentric radial velocity: 13338 ± 45 km/s
- Distance: 625 Mly
- Apparent magnitude (B): 16.73
- magnitude (J): 13.868
- magnitude (H): 13.130
- magnitude (K): 12.997

Characteristics
- Type: SB
- Apparent size (V): 0'.200 × 0'.192

Other designations
- WISEA J050159.75−144314.3, 2MASS J05015972−1443145, 2MASX J05015972−1443143, IRAS F04596−1447, NVSS J050159−144306

6dFGS gJ050159.7−144314 is an unbarred spiral galaxy and an active galactic nucleus in the constellation Lepus. Its velocity with respect to the cosmic microwave background is 13,338±45 km/s, which corresponds to a Hubble distance of 625 Mly (191 Mpc). Its diameter is thought to be about 35,000 light-years, or roughly one-third in size compared to the Milky Way.

== Supernovae ==
One supernova has been observed in 6dFGS gJ050159.7−144314:

SN 2025byu (mag. 18.42) was discovered by ZTF on February 18, 2025.
