= NGC 59 =

Galaxy in the constellation Cetus

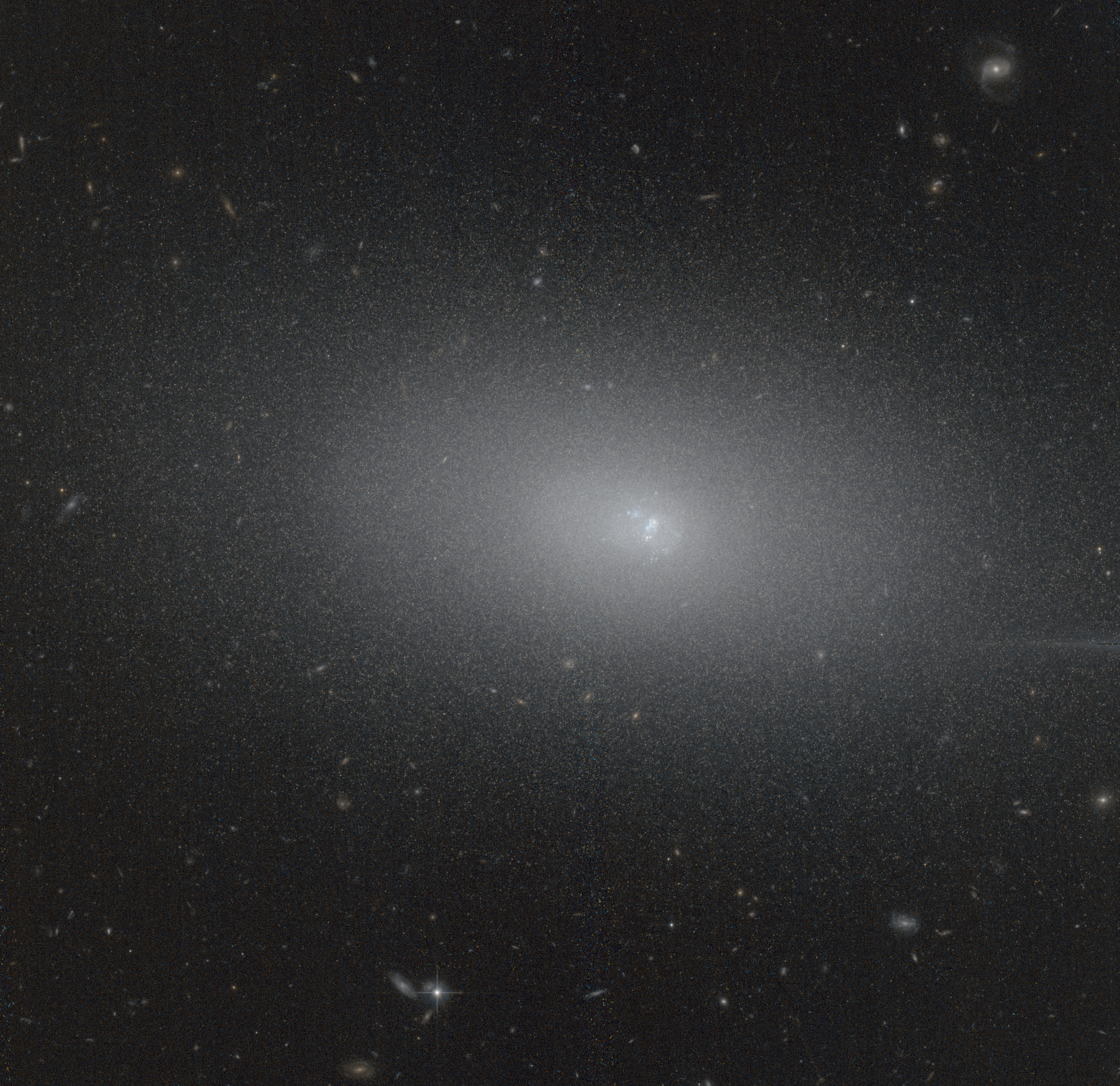
- Hubble image of NGC 59

Observation data (J2000 epoch)
- Constellation: Cetus
- Right ascension: 00^{h} 15^{m} 25.126^{s}
- Declination: −21° 26′ 39.68″
- Distance: 17.3 Mly (5.30 Mpc)
- Apparent magnitude (V): 12.59
- Absolute magnitude (B): 13.21

Characteristics
- Type: S0

Other designations
- MCG -04-01-026, PGC 1034

NGC 59 is a lenticular galaxy in the constellation Cetus. It is a probable member of the Sculptor Group. It is approximately 17 million light-years away.

NGC 59 has a stellar mass of 5 × 10^{8} M_{☉} and it is a low-luminosity, low-metallicity galaxy. It has a young (2 to 6 billion years old) low-metallicity population at its center and an older (about 8 billion years old) overlaying population that has also a low metallicity.
