= IC 1574 =

Dwarf Irregular galaxy in the constellation Cetus

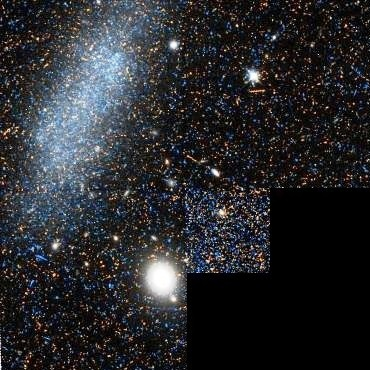
- IC 1574

Observation data (J2000 epoch)
- Constellation: Cetus
- Right ascension: 00^{h} 43^{m} 3.5670^{s}
- Declination: −22° 14′ 35.256″
- Distance: 17 Mly
- Apparent magnitude (V): 13.7

Characteristics
- Type: IBm
- Apparent size (V): 2.1′ × 0.8′

Other designations
- ESO 474-018, UGCA 9, MCG -04-02-043, PGC 2578

IC 1574 is an irregular galaxy 17 million light-years from Earth. It is a member of the Sculptor Group, a group of galaxies near the Local Group. It was discovered by DeLisle Stewart on 3 November 1898.
