= ESO 540-030 =

Faint dwarf galaxy in the constellation Sculptor

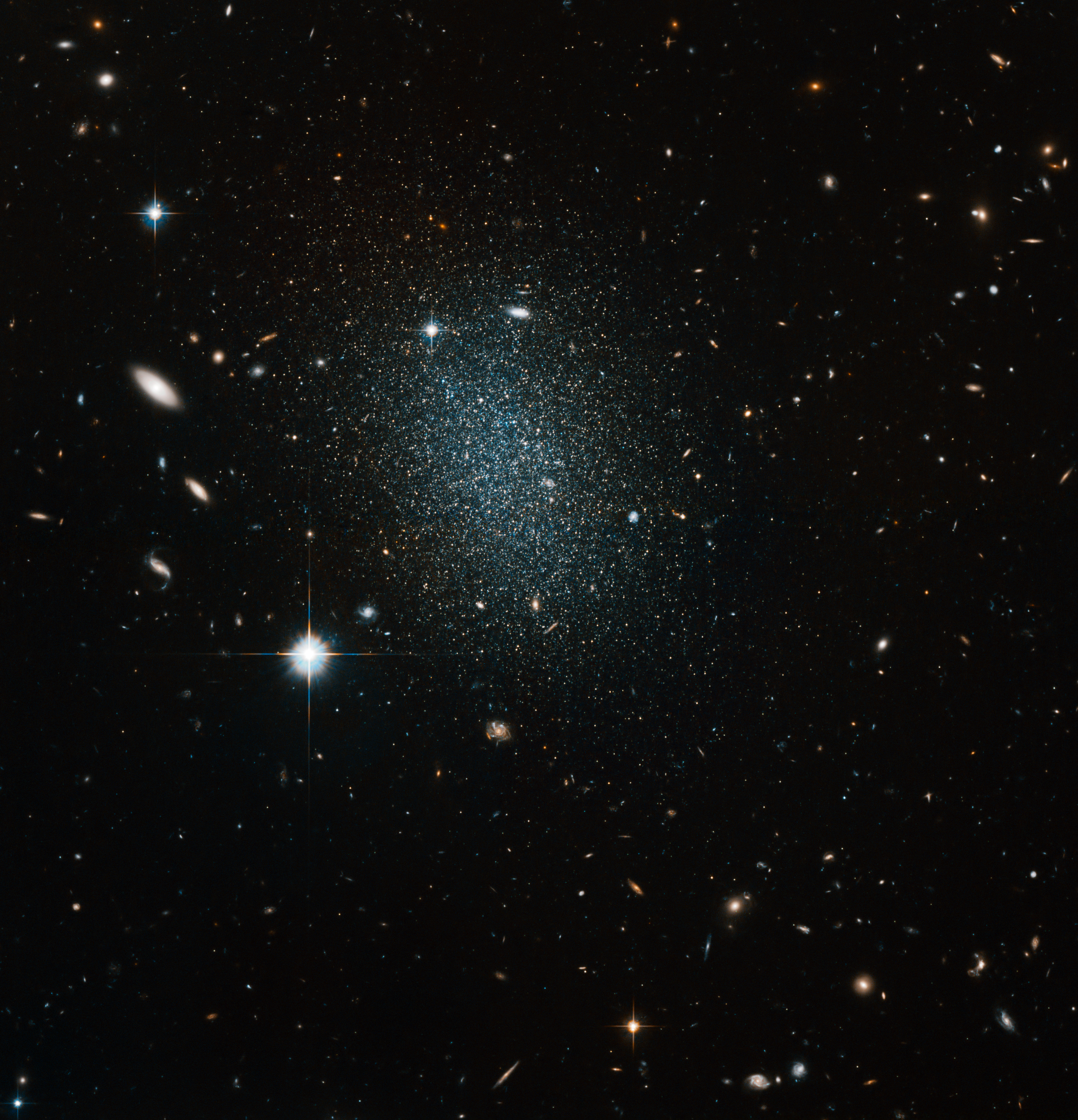
- Hubble Space Telescope image of ESO 540-030

Observation data (J2000 epoch)
- Constellation: Sculptor
- Right ascension: 00^{h} 49^{m} 21.1^{s}
- Declination: −18° 04′ 34″
- Redshift: 0.000747
- Heliocentric radial velocity: 224 km/s
- Distance: 11.35 ± 0.26 Mly (3.48 ± 0.08 Mpc)
- Group or cluster: Sculptor Group
- Apparent magnitude (B): 16.45

Characteristics
- Type: dG
- Apparent size (V): 0.81′ × 0.56′

Other designations
- PGC 2881

ESO 540-030 is a faint dwarf galaxy in the Sculptor Group. It has the appearance of a massive scattering of dim stars.

The galaxy is located slightly more than 11 million light-years from Earth. It is difficult to observe due to galaxies situated behind ESO 540-030, and five bright stars between the galaxy and the Solar System. The brightest of them is located around 1500 light-years away from us.
