= NGC 300 =

Galaxy in the constellation Sculptor

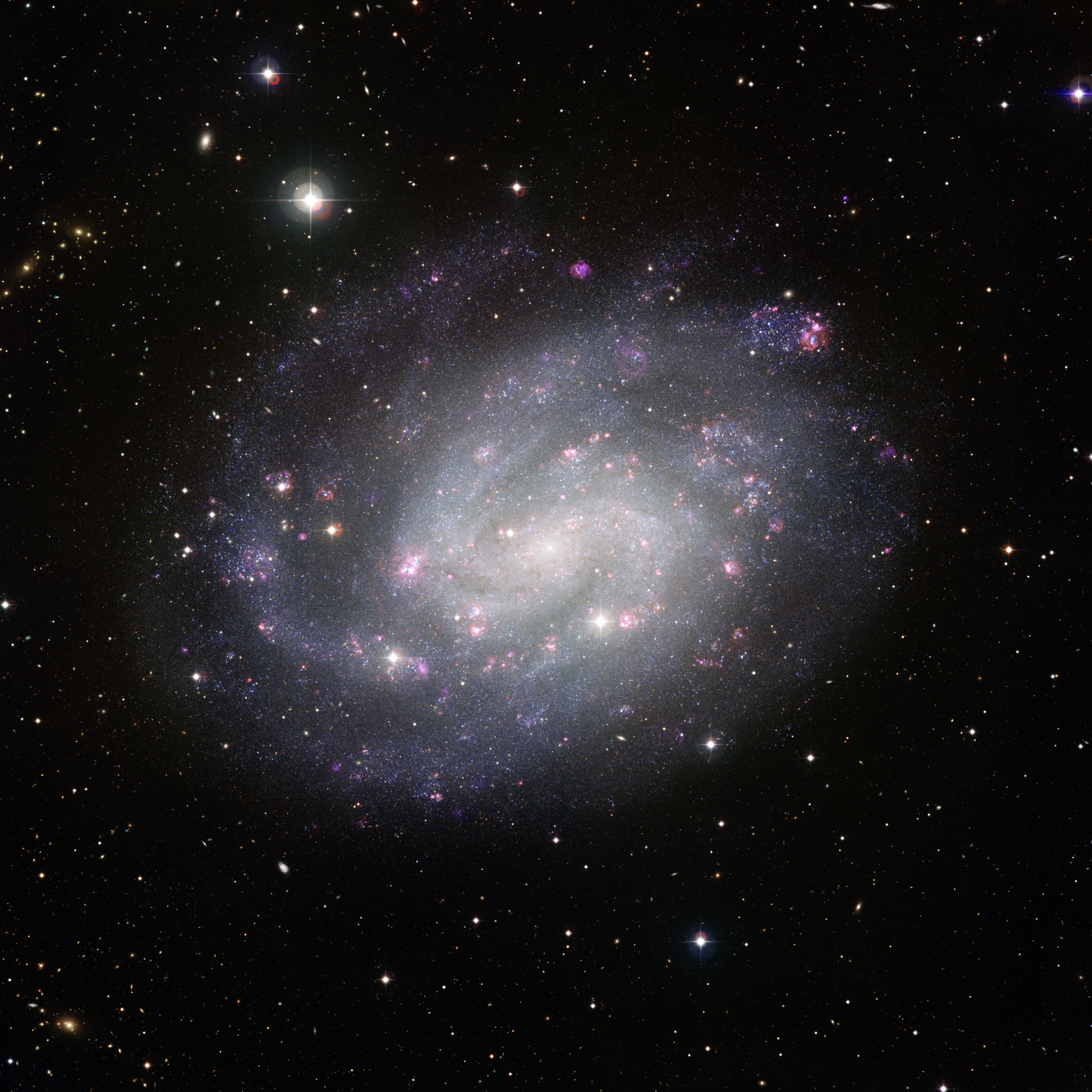
- NGC 300 imaged by ESO's La Silla Observatory

Observation data (J2000 epoch)
- Constellation: Sculptor
- Right ascension: 00^{h} 54^{m} 53.48^{s}
- Declination: −37° 41′ 03.8″
- Redshift: 0.000480
- Heliocentric radial velocity: 144 ± 1 km/s
- Distance: 6.07 ± 0.23 Mly (1.86 ± 0.07 Mpc)^{[a]}
- Apparent magnitude (V): 9.0

Characteristics
- Type: SA(s)d
- Mass: (2.9 ± 0.2) × 10^{10} M_{☉}
- Size: 55,200 ly (16.92 kpc) (estimated)
- Apparent size (V): 21.9′ × 15.5′

Other designations
- ESO 295- G 020, IRAS 00525-3757, 2MASX J00545347-3741037, MCG -06-03-005, PGC 3238, Caldwell 70

NGC 300 (also known as Caldwell 70 or the Sculptor Pinwheel Galaxy) is a spiral galaxy in the constellation Sculptor. It was discovered on 5 August 1826 by Scottish astronomer James Dunlop. It is one of the closest galaxies to the Local Group, and it most likely lies between the latter and the Sculptor Group. It is the brightest of the five main spirals in the direction of the Sculptor Group. It is inclined at an angle of 42° when viewed from Earth and shares many characteristics of the Triangulum Galaxy. It is about 94,000 light-years in diameter, somewhat smaller than the Milky Way, and has an estimated mass of (2.9 ± 0.2) × 10^{10} M_{☉}.

== Nearby galaxies and group information ==
NGC 300 and the Magellanic type barred spiral galaxy NGC 55 have traditionally been identified as members of the Sculptor Group or LGG 4, a nearby group of galaxies in the constellation of the same name. However, recent distance measurements indicate that these two galaxies actually lie in the foreground. It is likely that NGC 300 and NGC 55 form a gravitationally bound pair.

The dwarf galaxy Sculptor C is located about 6.65 million light-years (2.04 megaparsecs) away from the Sun, and is very likely a satellite galaxy of NGC 300. Sculptor C has an absolute magnitude of about −9.1 which is typical for other recently discovered ultra-faint dwarf galaxies.

== Distance estimates ==
In 1986, Allan Sandage estimated the distance to NGC 300 to be 5.41 Mly (1.66 Mpc). By 1992, this had been updated to 6.9 Mly (2.1 Mpc) by Freedman et al. In 2006, this was revised by Karachentsev et al. to be 7.0±0.3 Mly (2.15±0.10 Mpc). At about the same time, the tip of the red giant branch (TRGB) method was used to produce an estimate of 5.9±0.4 Mly (1.82±0.13 Mpc) using edge detection and 6.1±0.4 Mly (1.87±0.12 Mpc) using maximum likelihood. These results were consistent with estimates using near-infrared photometry of Cepheid variables by Gieren et al. 2005 that provided an estimate of 6.1±0.2 Mly (1.88±0.07 Mpc). Combining the recent TRGB and Cepheid estimates the distance to NGC 300 is estimated at 6.07±0.23 Mly (1.86±0.07 Mpc).^{[a]}

== Transient Events ==
AT 2019qyl was discovered by the Distance Less Than 40 Mpc Survey (DLT40) on 26 September 2019, at magnitude 17.1. It was initially classified as a Type IIn/LBV, but later analysis classified the star as a classical nova.

SN 2010da (type LBV, mag. 16) was discovered by Monard on 23 May 2010. The optical transient was detected 15".9 west and 16".8 north the center of the galaxy at coordinates 00 55 04.86 −37 41 43.7. Two sets of independent follow-up spectroscopy data suggested that this was again another optical transient rather than a supernova, possibly an outbursting luminous blue variable star according to one spectrum, as earlier predicted from the nature of the candidate mid-infrared progenitor. The transient faded by 0.5–0.7 mag in 9 days, much faster than the 2008 transient in NGC 300.

SN 2020acli (Type IIn-pec, mag. 18.4205) was discovered by the Distance Less Than 40 Mpc Survey (DLT40) on 12 December 2020.

AT 2024oth (type unknown, mag. 19.85) was discovered by BlackGEM on 27 June 2024.

AT 2024txt (type unknown, mag. 19.77) was discovered by Pan-STARRS on 29 July 2024.

=== NGC 300-OT ===
On a CCD image obtained on 14 May 2008, amateur astronomer L.A.G. Berto Monard discovered a bright optical transient (OT) in NGC 300 that is designated NGC 300-OT. It is located at RA: 00^{h} 54^{m} 34.552^{s} and DEC: −37° 38′ 31.79″ in a spiral arm containing active star formation. Its broad-band magnitude was 14.3 in that image. An earlier image (from 24 April 2008), taken just after NGC 300 reemerged from behind the Sun, evidenced an already brightening OT at ~16.3 magnitude. No brightening was detected on a 8 February 2008 image, nor on any earlier ones. The transient's peak measured magnitude was 14.69 on 15 May 2008.

At discovery, the transient had an absolute magnitude of MV ≈ −13, making it faint in comparison to a typical core-collapse supernova but bright in comparison to a classical nova. Additionally, the photometric and spectroscopic properties of the OT imply that it is not a luminous blue variable either. Since its peak, brightness dropped smoothly through September 2008 while becoming continuously redder. After September 2008, brightness continued to fall at a lower rate in the optical spectrum but with strong Hα emissions. Further, the optical spectrum is mostly made up of fairly narrow Hydrogen Balmer and Ca II emission lines coupled with strong Ca II H&K absorption. Research into historical Hubble images provide an accurate upper bound on the progenitor star's brightness. This suggested a low-mass main sequence star as progenitor with the transient resulting from a stellar merger similar to red Galactic nova V838 Monocerotis. Analysis of historical images of the area of the OT suggest with 70% certainty that the progenitor formed in a burst of stars around 8–13 Myr ago and implies the progenitor's mass to be 12–25 M_{☉} assuming the OT is due to an evolving massive star.

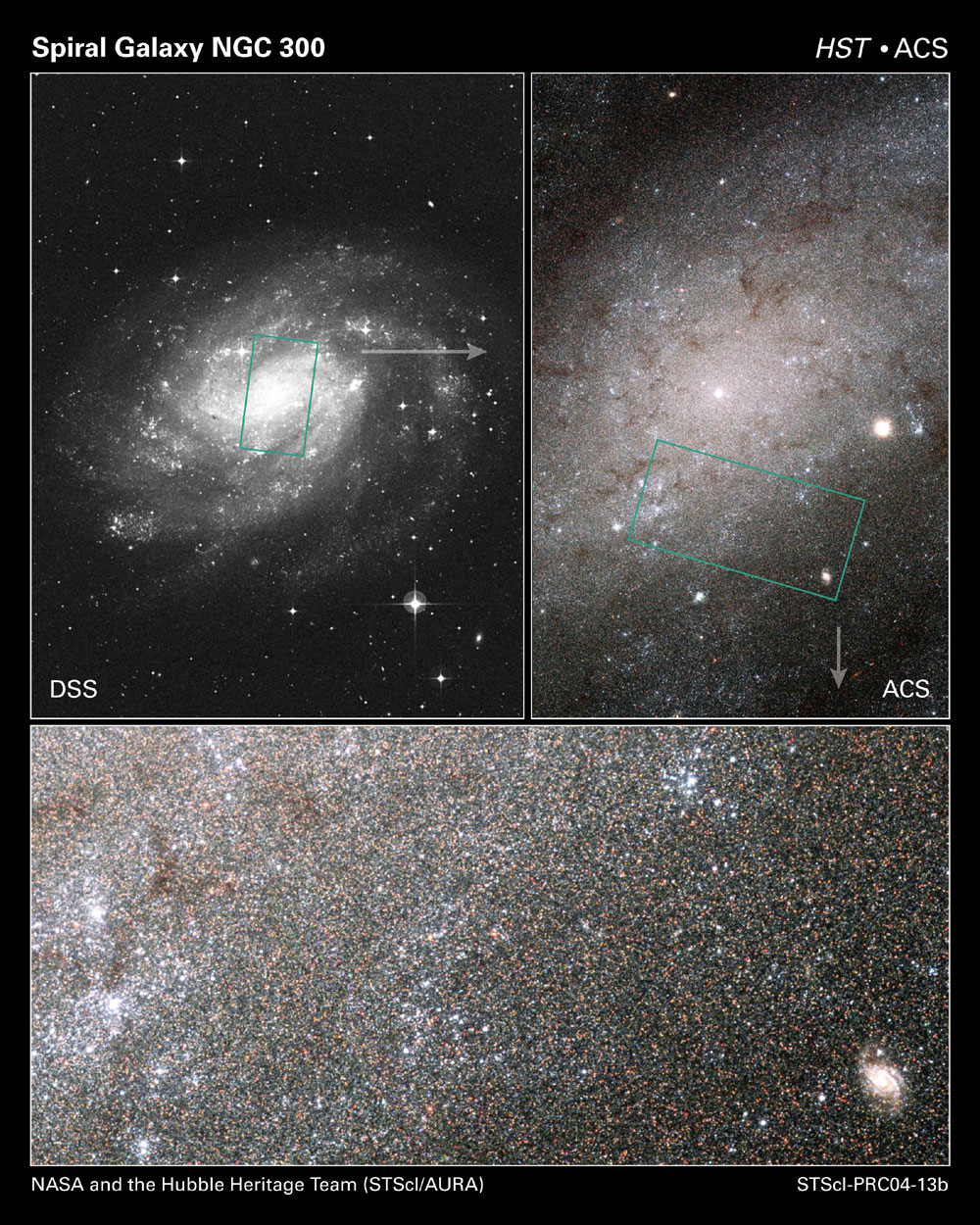
NGC 300 zoom-in by the Hubble Space Telescope

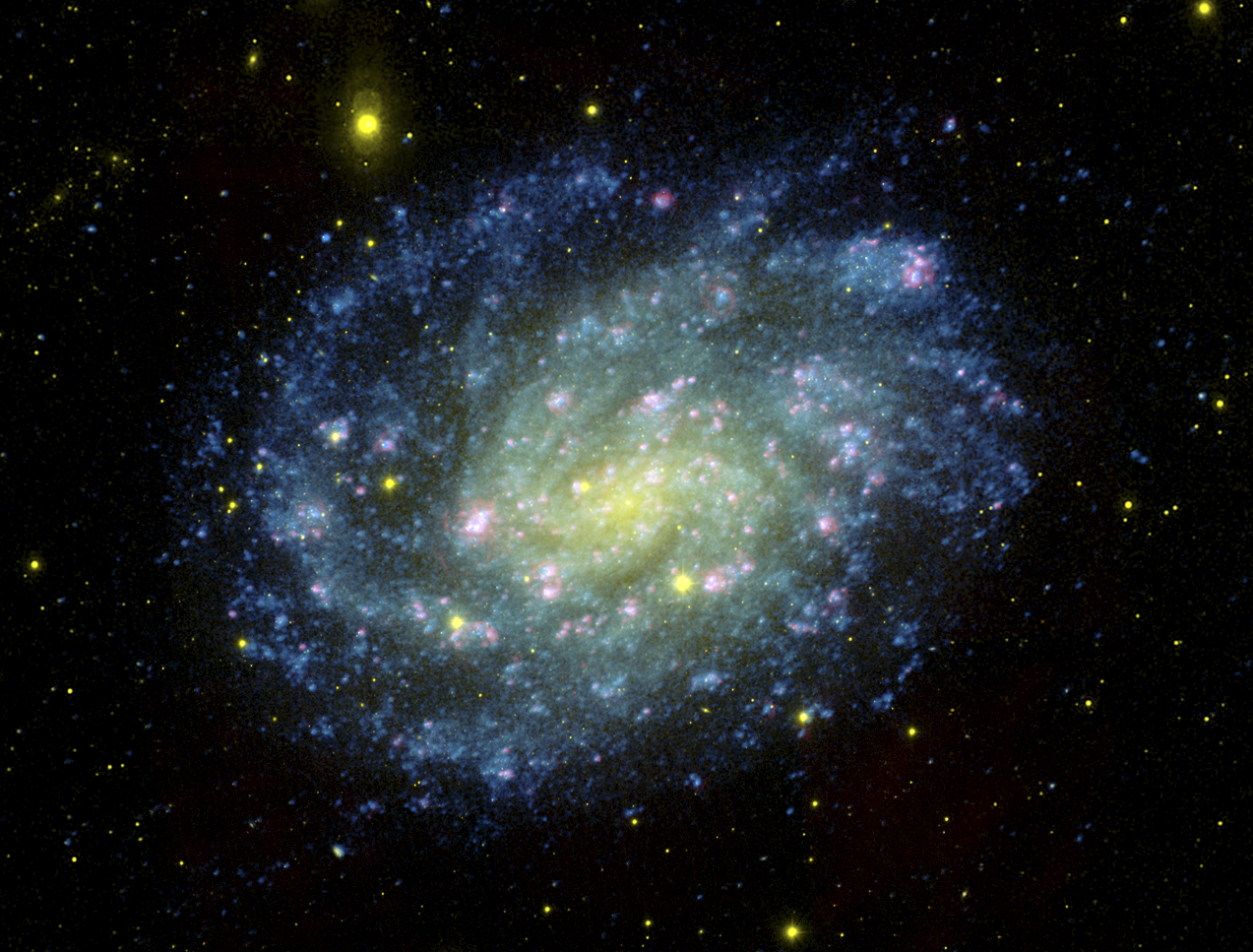
NGC 300 by GALEX, in ultraviolet light

However, in 2008 a bright mid-infrared progenitor to the transient was discovered in historical Spitzer data. This was a star that was obscured by dust, with energy distribution analogous to a black-body of R ≈ 300 AU and radiating at T ≈ 300 K with L_{bol} ≈ ×10^{6} L_{☉}. This demonstrated that the transient was associated with an energetic explosion of a low-mass ≈ 10 M_{☉} star. The transient's low luminosity as compared to typical core-collapse supernova, combined with its spectral attributes and dust covered properties, make it nearly identical to NGG 6946's SN 2008S.

The spectrum of NGC 300-OT observed with Spitzer shows strong, broad emission features at 8 μm and 12 μm. Such features are also seen in Galactic carbon-rich protoplanetary nebulae.

On 19 April 2025, NGC 300-OT was classified as an Intermediate-Luminosity Red Transient (ILRT).

== Astronomical objects ==
=== Binary black hole system ===
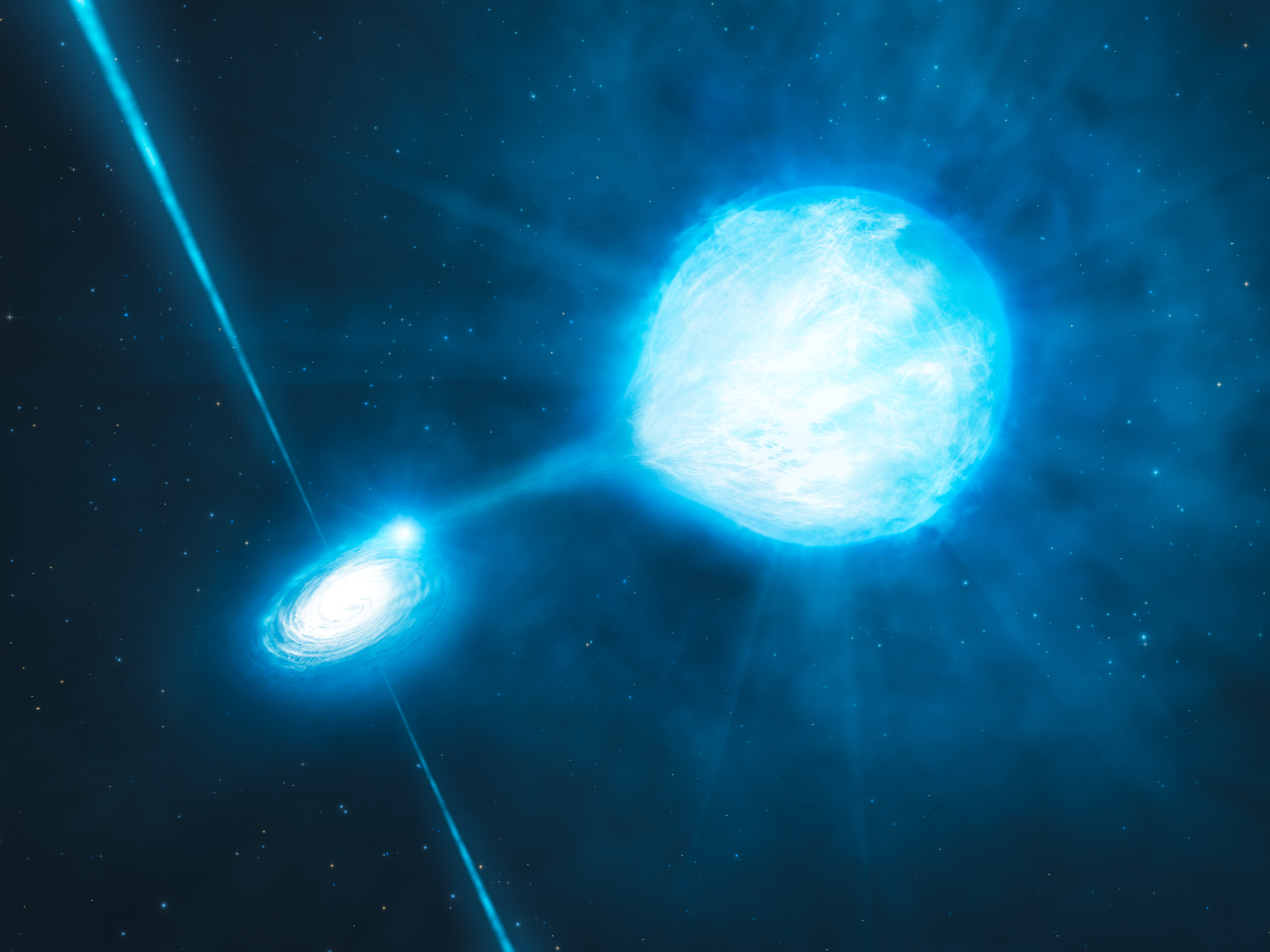
Artistic representation of NGC 300 X-1 system

An x-ray source in NGC 300 is designated NGC 300 X-1. Astronomers speculate that NGC 300 X-1 is a new kind of Wolf-Rayet + stellar black hole binary system similar to the confirmed such system IC 10 X-1. Their shared properties include an orbital period of 32.8 hours. The black hole has a mass of 17 ± 4 M_{☉} and the WR star has a mass of 26+7
−5 M_{☉}. Both objects orbit each other at a distance of about 18.2 R_{☉}.

=== WO star ===
There is an oxygen-sequence Wolf–Rayet star (WO4 type), known as STWR 13, located in one of the bright H II regions in NGC 300.

== Notes ==
1. Average (1.845±0.125, 1.86±0.07) = ((1.845 + 1.86) / 2) ± ((0.125^{2} + 0.07^{2})^{0.5} / 2) = 1.86 ± 0.07

== See also ==
- List of NGC objects (1–1000)
