= PGC 2933 =

Dwarf irregular galaxy

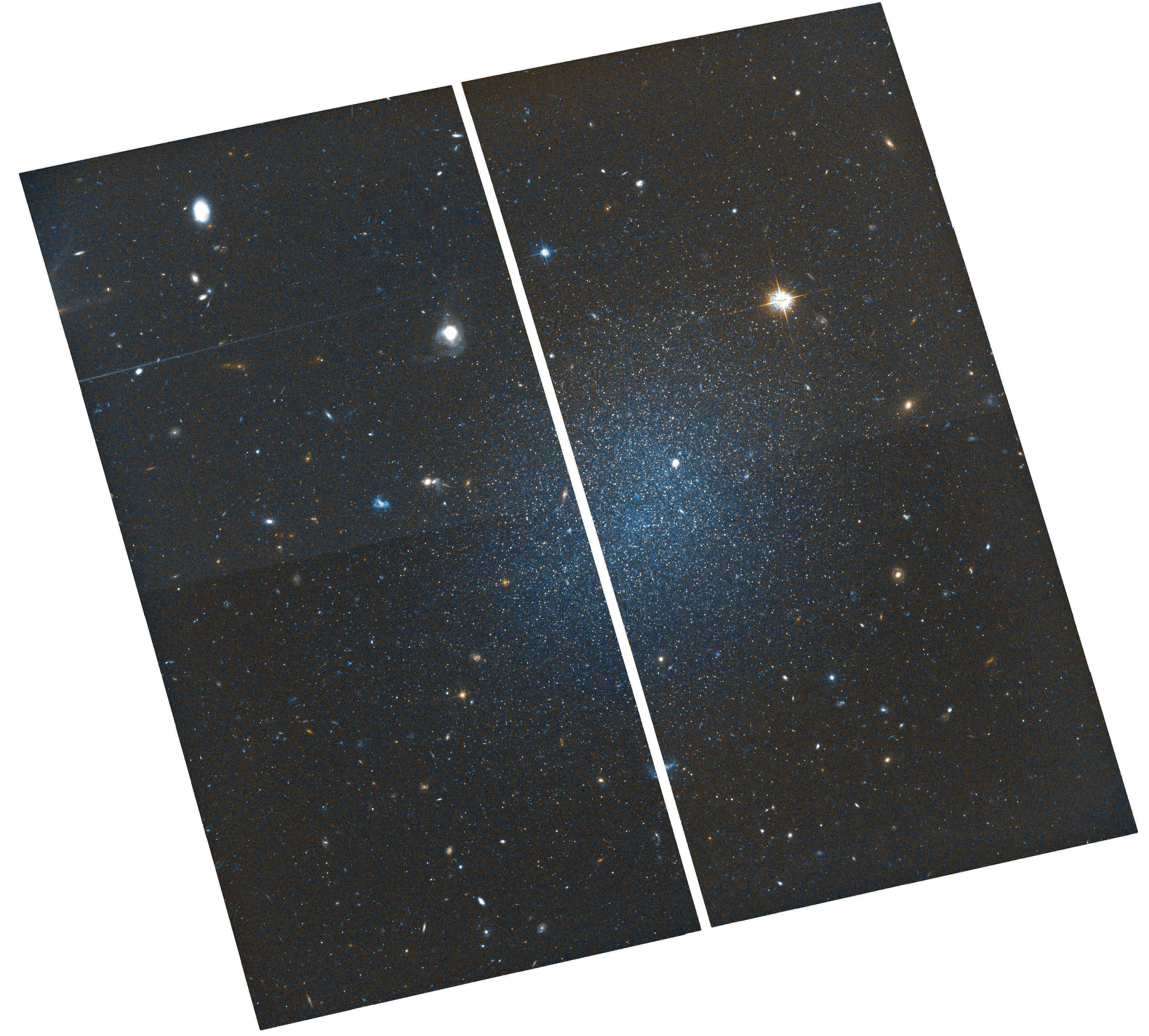
- PGC 2933 in a Hubble Space Telescope photo

Observation data (J2000 epoch)
- Constellation: Cetus
- Right ascension: 00^{h} 50^{m} 24.5^{s}
- Declination: −19° 54′ 23″
- Redshift: 0.000761
- Heliocentric radial velocity: 228 km/s
- Distance: 11.15
- Group or cluster: Sculptor Group
- Apparent magnitude (V): 16.01
- Apparent magnitude (B): 16.63

Characteristics
- Type: dG
- Apparent size (V): 0.830′ × 0.512′

Other designations
- ESO 540-32, ESO-LV 540-0320, [FG85] 24, [KK98a] 10, [KK98a] 004756.0-201044, LEDA 2933, PGC 2933

PGC 2933, also known as LEDA 2933 or ESO 540-032, is a faint dwarf irregular galaxy in the Sculptor Group. It lies in the southern constellation Cetus. According to measurements, the galaxy is located 11.15 million light-years away. The stars within ESO 540-032 consist of mostly old red giant branch stars with poor metallicity and young stars with slightly higher metallicity. It may have a large globular cluster (GC) orbiting it.

Because it is situated in the Sculptor Group, it is one of the closest galaxies to the Milky Way. It is obscured by a few brighter stars and galaxies (the brightest of them on the right side of the photo is 1425 light-years away from the Solar System). The galaxy has a diameter of 2,000 light years.

== Stellar population ==
The stellar population of this galaxy consist of old metal-poor AGB branch stars with a small population of slightly more metal-rich blue stars with young ages between 150-500 million years old. Theses stars are concentrated in the central regions of the galaxy. It star formation properties are similar to the Fornax dwarf galaxy, a dwarf galaxy in the constellation Fornax.

== History ==
The star formation currently going on in ESO 540-032 likely originated from a single event comparable to the situation seen with the Phoenix dwarf galaxy. In the future, it will likely transition from a dwarf irregular galaxy into a dwarf elliptical galaxy.
