= Sculptor Group =

Loosely grouped galaxy group in the constellation Sculptor

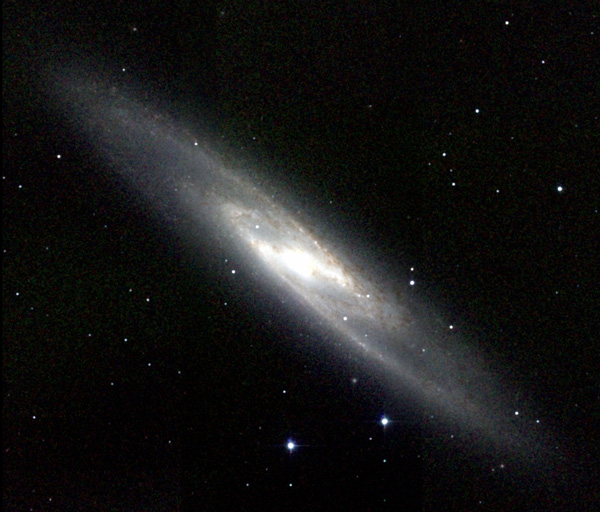
- The Sculptor Galaxy (NGC 253), as seen at near-infrared wavelengths. Credit: 2MASS.

Observation data (Epoch J2000)
- Constellation: Sculptor/Cetus
- Right ascension: 00^{h} 48^{m}
- Declination: −25° 17′
- Brightest member: Sculptor Galaxy (NGC 253)
- Number of galaxies: 13

Other designations
- NGC 253 Group, LGG 4, Sculptor Filament, South Polar Group, South Galactic Pole Group

The Sculptor Group is a loose group of galaxies visible near the south galactic pole. The group is one of the closest groups of galaxies to the Local Group; the distance to the center of the group from the Milky Way is approximately 3.9 Mpc (12.7 Mly).

The Sculptor Galaxy (NGC 253) and a few other galaxies form a gravitationally-bound core in the center of this group. A few other galaxies at the periphery may be associated with the group but may not be gravitationally bound. Because most of the galaxies in this group are actually weakly gravitationally bound, the group may also be described as a filament. It is considered to be at an early stage of evolution in which galaxies are still falling into the group along filamentary structures.

The Scluptor Group lies within the within Coma–Sculptor Cloud.

== Members ==
The table below lists galaxies that have been identified as associated with the Sculptor Galaxy (and hence associated with the group) by I. D. Karachentsev and collaborators.

Members of the Sculptor Group
| Name | Type | R.A. (J2000) | Dec. (J2000) | Redshift (km/s) | Apparent Magnitude |
|---|---|---|---|---|---|
| IC 1574 | IM(s)m | 00^{h} 43^{m} 03.8^{s} | −22° 14′ 49″ | 363 ± 4 | 15.1 |
| NGC 59 | SA(rs)0 | 00^{h} 15^{m} 25.1^{s} | −21° 26′ 39.8″ | 362 ± 10 | 13.1 |
| NGC 247 | SAB(s)d | 00^{h} 47^{m} 08.5^{s} | −20° 45′ 37″ | 156 ± 2 | 9.9 |
| NGC 625 | SB(s)m | 01^{h} 35^{m} 04.6^{s} | −41° 26′ 10″ | 396 ± 1 | 11.7 |
| NGC 7793 | SA(s)d | 23^{h} 57^{m} 49.8^{s} | −32° 35′ 28″ | 227 ± 2 | 10.0 |
| PGC 2881 | IABm | 00^{h} 49^{m} 20.9^{s} | −18° 04′ 32″ | | 16.5 |
| PGC 2933 | IAB(s)m pec | 00^{h} 50^{m} 24.3^{s} | −19° 54′ 24″ | | 16.6 |
| PGC 6430 | IB(s)m | 01^{h} 45^{m} 03.7^{s} | −43° 35′ 53″ | 391 ± 2 | 12.7 |
| Sculptor-dE1 | dE | 00^{h} 23^{m} 51.7^{s} | −24° 42′ 18″ | | 16.9 |
| Sculptor Dwarf Irregular Galaxy (PGC 621) | IBm | 00^{h} 08^{m} 13.4^{s} | −34° 34′ 42″ | 221 ± 6 | 15.5 |
| Sculptor Galaxy (NGC 253) | SAB(s)c | 00^{h} 47^{m} 33.1^{s} | −25° 17′ 18″ | 243 ± 2 | 8.0 |
| UGCA 15 | IB(s)m | 00^{h} 49^{m} 49.2^{s} | −21° 00′ 54″ | 295 ± 0 | 15.2 |
| UGCA 442 | SB(s)m | 23^{h} 43^{m} 45.5^{s} | −31° 57′ 24″ | 267 ± 2 | 13.6 |

The object names used in the above table differ from the names used by Karachentsev and collaborators. NGC, IC, UGC, and PGC numbers have been used when possible to allow for easier referencing.

=== Field galaxies ===
The irregular galaxy NGC 55, the spiral galaxy NGC 300, and their companion galaxies have been considered by many researchers to be part of the Sculptor Group or LGG 4. LGG 4 is classified to have at least 7 members, which are NGC 55, NGC 7793, NGC 300, ESO 349-31, ESO 351-30, ESO 295-29 and ESO 352-2. However, recent distance measurements to these and other galaxies in the same region of the sky show that NGC 55, NGC 300, and their companions may simply be foreground galaxies that are physically unassociated with the Sculptor Group. The galaxies NGC 24 and NGC 45 are located in the vicinity of the Sculptor Group, but are now considered background objects.
