= BlackGEM =

Telescope array

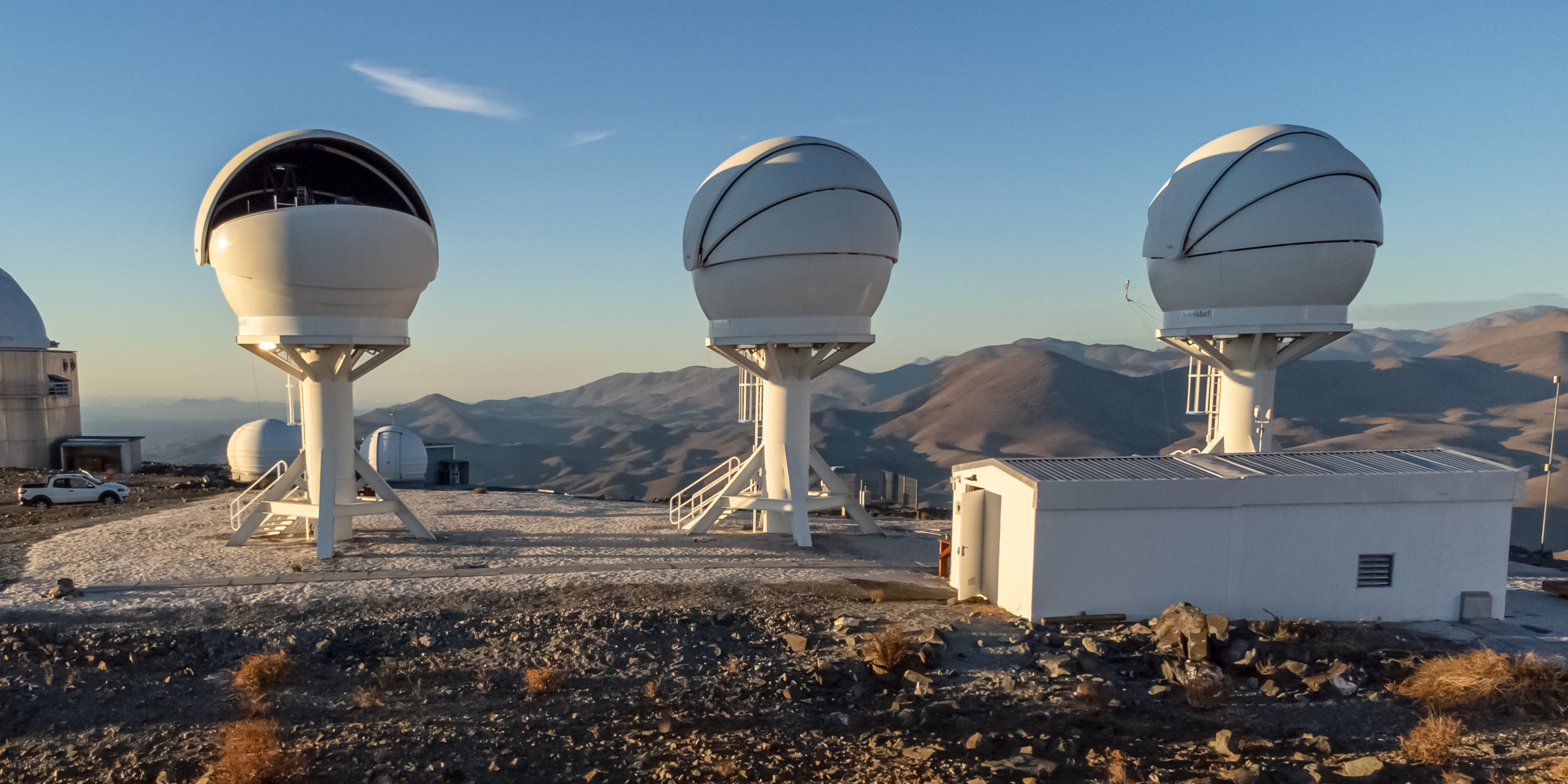
- Location(s): Chile
- Diameter: 65 cm (2 ft 2 in)
- Website: astro.ru.nl/blackgem/
- Related media on Commons

BlackGEM is an array of optical telescopes located at the La Silla astronomical observatory in Chile. This system is specifically designed to detect the optical counterparts from gravitational wave sources detected with Virgo and LIGO. Principal investigator of the array is Paul Groot.

== Characteristics ==
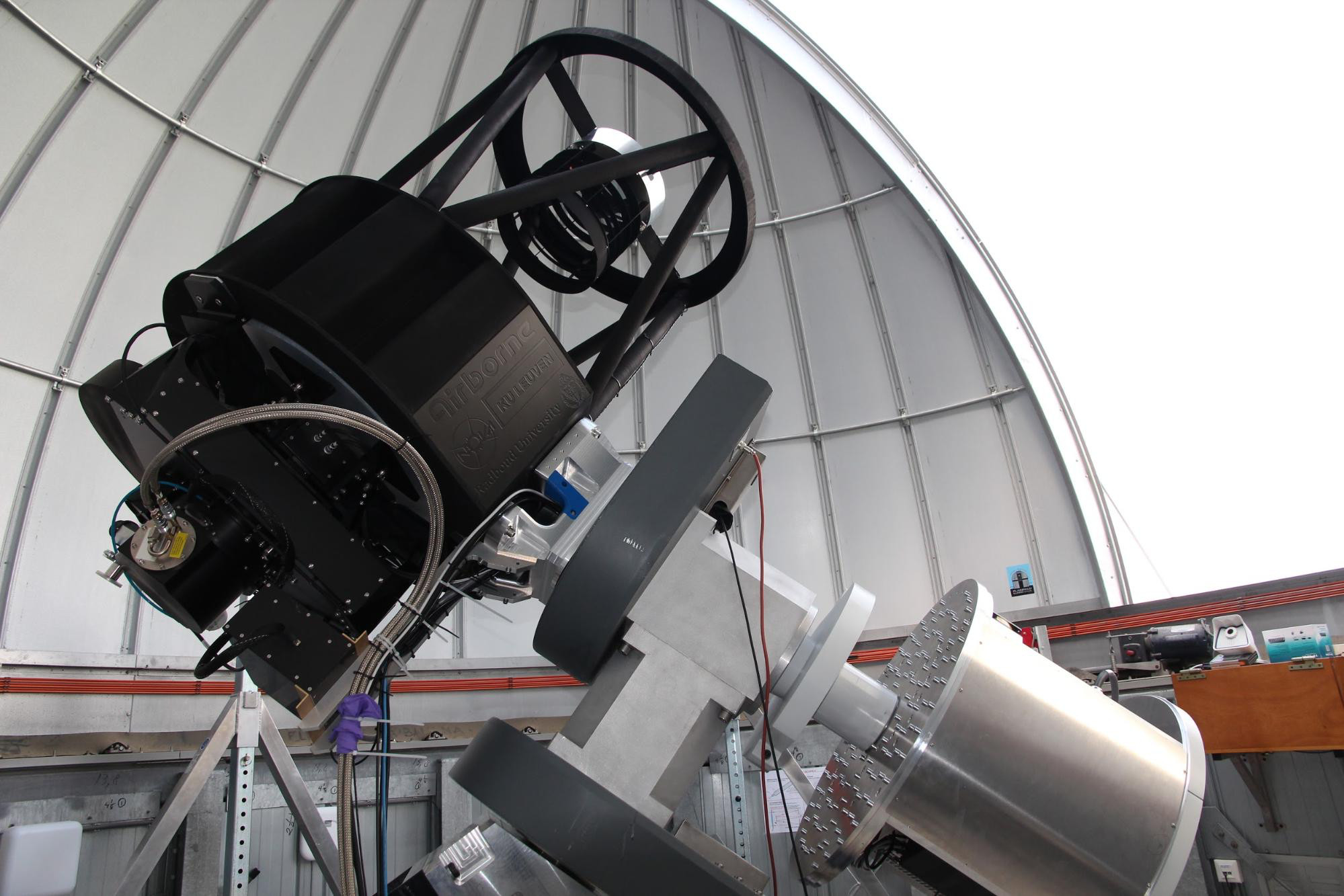
Prototype BlackGEM telescope in the dome in Nijmegen, The Netherlands.

The BlackGEM array will consist of 10-15 telescopes each 65 cm in diameter when completed. This configuration uniquely allows the pointing of the combined telescope to be matched to the often elongated ellipse-shaped source-location estimates provided by gravitational wave detectors. Once an optical counterpart has been detected, all telescopes are pointed at the target giving a light-collecting area and sensitivity equivalent to that of a single 3.5 m diameter telescope, but with a larger two-square-degree field of view.

Each telescope is equipped with a 10,000 by 10,000 pixel CCD with 9 micron pixel size that samples the full focal plane of the telescope. This, combined with the (f/5.5) focal length of the telescope, means that the angular resolution of the instrument is limited only by the seeing (which is about 1 arcsecond at La Silla). Being located at this longitude enables rapid spectroscopic follow-up of any detected gravitational wave source with, for instance, the Very Large Telescope.

== Operational phases ==
The array will eventually comprise 15 telescopes, each of 65cm diameter, making BlackGEM a powerful survey instrument. The first phase of operations will therefore perform a complete survey of the southern sky in 6 different filters, to generate the necessary templates for image subtraction. In parallel to this phase, multi-epoch imaging will give a characterization of any fast (shorter than one day) transient sources down to 23rd magnitude. In parallel, the BlackGEM array will act on triggers from the gravitational wave detectors to look for optical emission from such events as merging black holes and neutron stars.

As of 2022, three (of a planned 15) telescopes are in place at ESO's La Silla Observatory. Due to the COVID-19 pandemic, on-site work on the telescopes was temporarily on pause. As of 2024, some discoveries are beginning to be made by BlackGEM.

== See also ==
- Lists of telescopes
