= NGC 45 =

Galaxy in the constellation Cetus

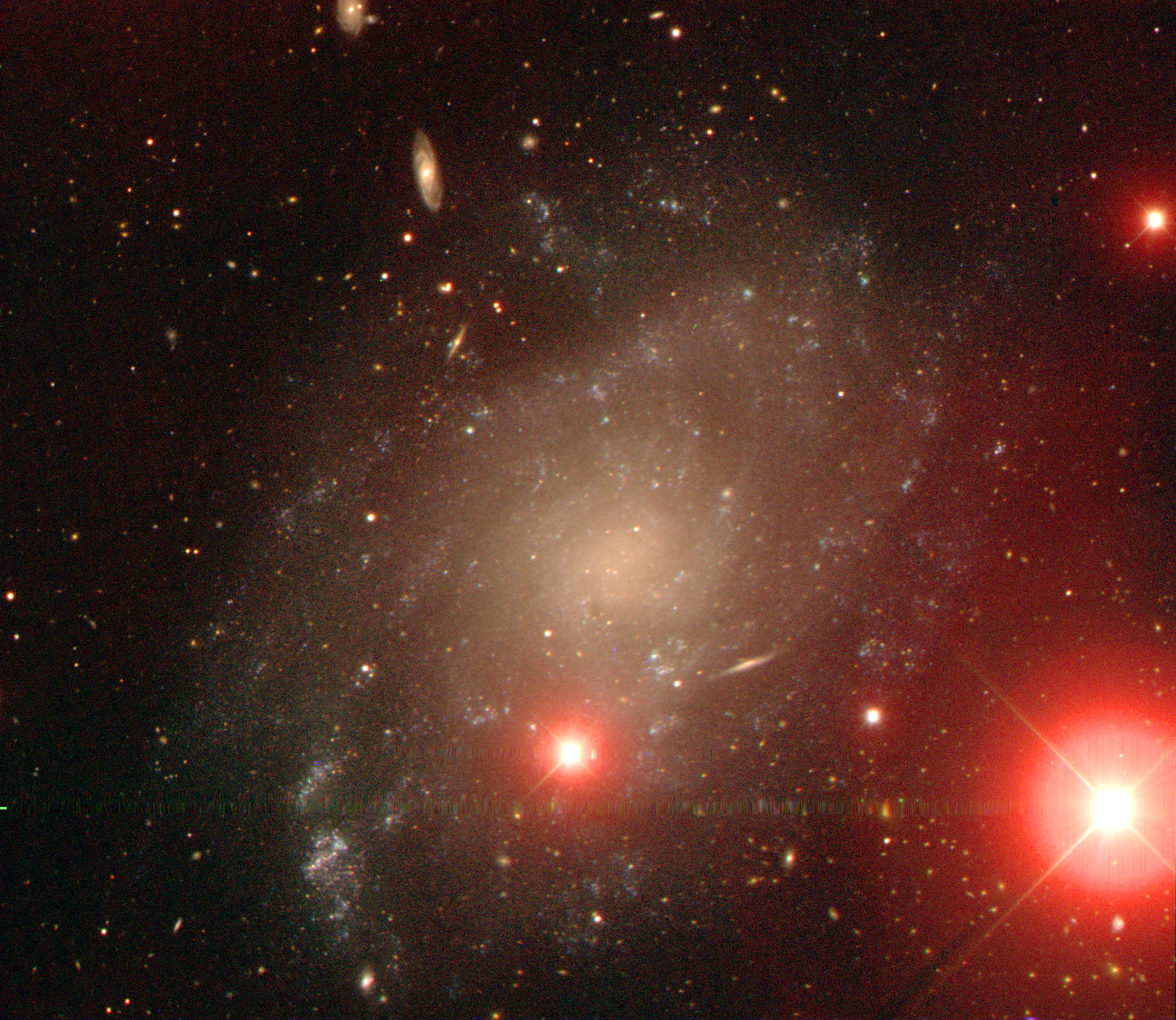
- NGC 45 imaged by DECam

Observation data (2000.0 epoch)
- Constellation: Cetus
- Right ascension: 00^{h} 14^{m} 03.989^{s}
- Declination: –23° 10′ 55.53″
- Redshift: 0.001558
- Heliocentric radial velocity: 466 km/s
- Distance: 21.7 Mly (6.64 Mpc)
- Apparent magnitude (V): 10.73±0.03
- Apparent magnitude (B): 11.21±0.03

Characteristics
- Type: SA(s)dm
- Mass/Light ratio: M_{☉}/L_{☉}
- Size: ~80,800 ly (24.76 kpc)
- Apparent size (V): 8.5′ × 5.9′

Other designations
- ESO 473- G 001, IRAS 00115-2327, UGCA 4, LEDA 930, MCG -04-01-21, PGC 930

NGC 45 is a low surface brightness spiral galaxy in the equatorial constellation of Cetus. It was discovered by the English astronomer John Herschel on 11 November 1835. The galaxy is located at a distance of 22 million light years and is receding with a heliocentric radial velocity of 466 km/s. It is located in the vicinity of the Sculptor Group, but is most likely a background galaxy.

The morphological class of NGC 45 is SA(s)dm, indicating this is a spiral galaxy with no prominent inner bar (SA) or ring (s) feature. There is no central bulge to speak of. The galactic plane is inclined at an angle of 55°±5° to the line of sight from the Earth, with the major axis of the elliptical profile being aligned along a position angle of 145°±5°. Star formation is proceeding at a modest rate of ~0.20 M_{☉}·yr^{−1}.

Unlike the Milky Way, NGC 45 has no clearly defined spiral arms, and its center bar nucleus is also very small and distorted. NGC 45 thus does not have a galactic habitable zone. For the Milky Way, the galactic habitable zone is commonly believed to be an annulus with an outer radius of about 10 kiloparsecs and an inner radius close to the Galactic Center, both of which lack hard boundaries.

== Astronomical Transients ==
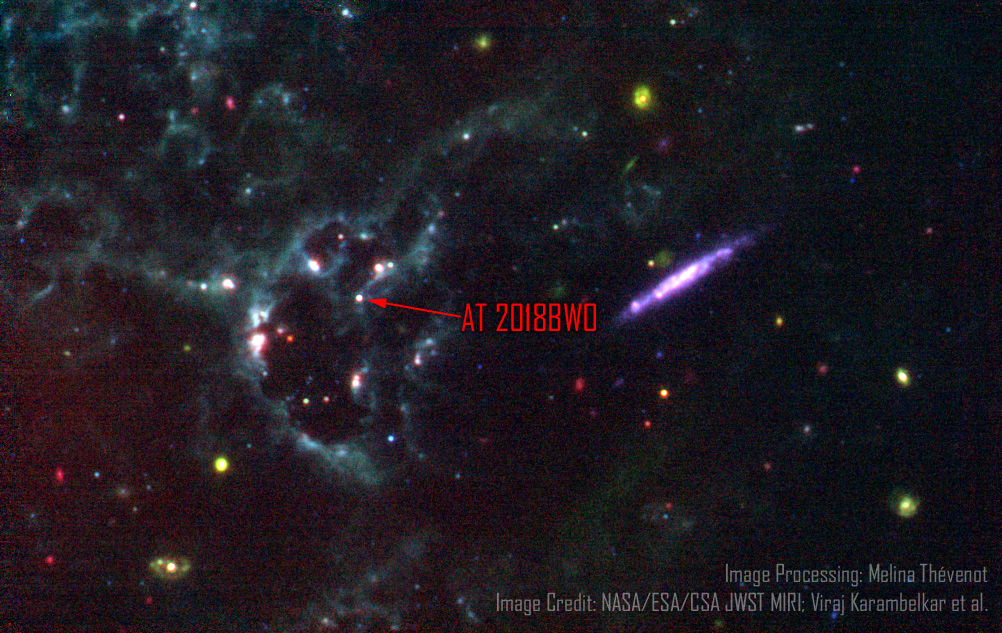
AT 2018bwo (red arrow) with JWST instrument MIRI

Two astronomical transients have been observed in NGC 45.

- AT 2018bwo (type LRN, mag. 16.4352) was discovered by the Distance Less Than 40 Mpc Survey (DLT40) on 22 May 2018. Luminous red novae are thought to be the result of stars merging. The progenitor of AT 2018bwo was a yellow supergiant star.
- AT 2018htr (type LBV, mag. 17.4692) was discovered by DLT40 on 3 November 2018.

== Gallery ==
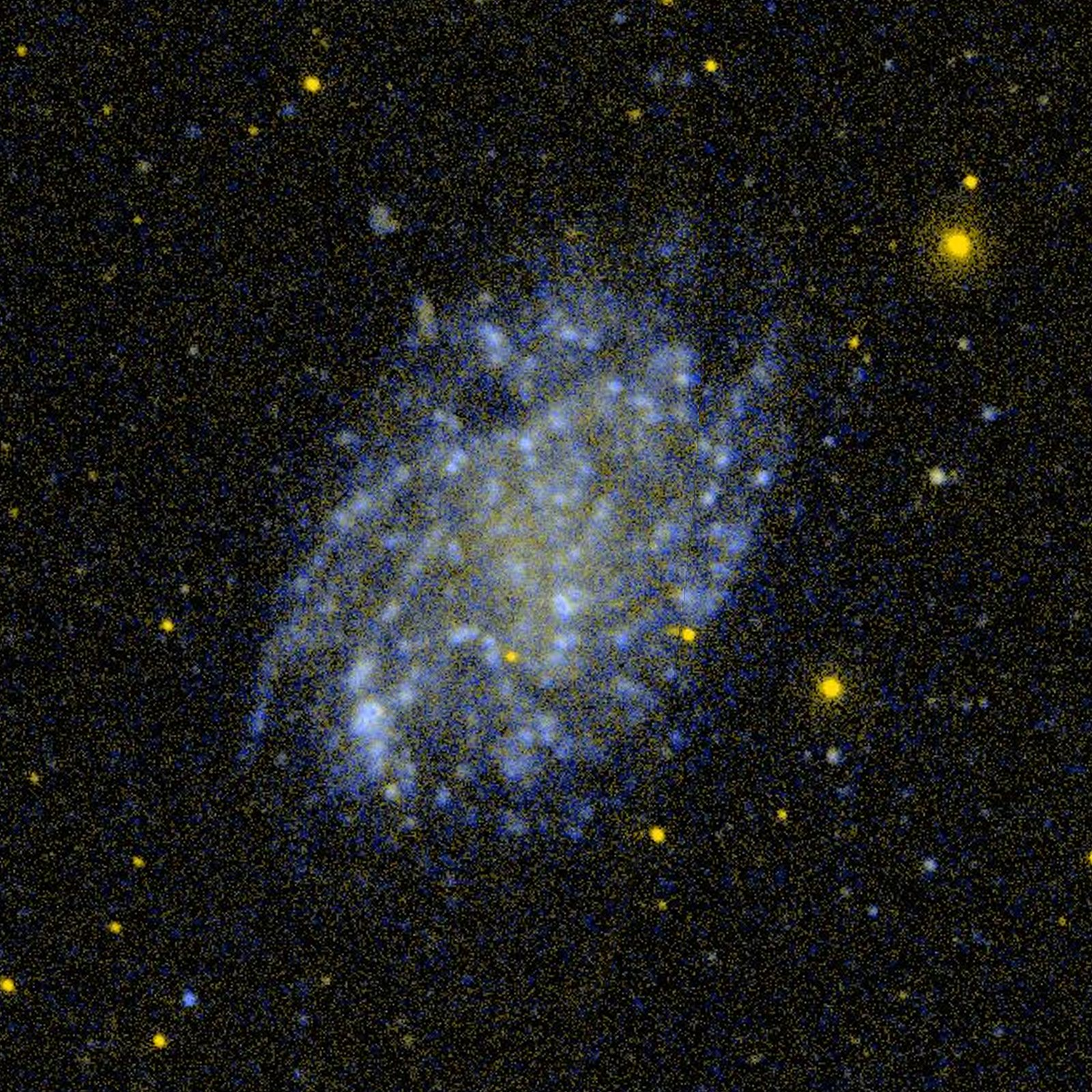
Galex (ultraviolet) view of NGC 45

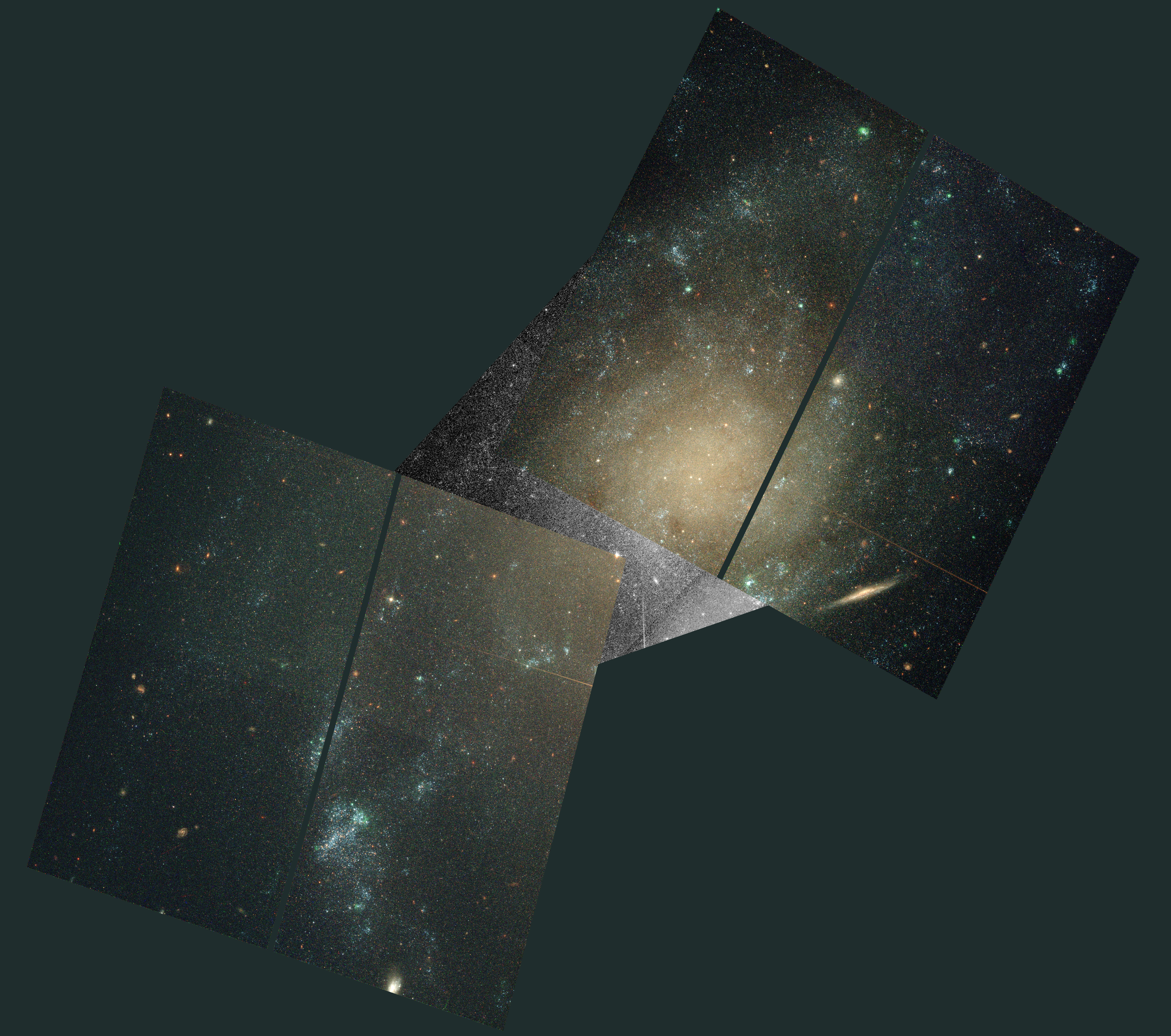
Hubble mosaic of NGC 45

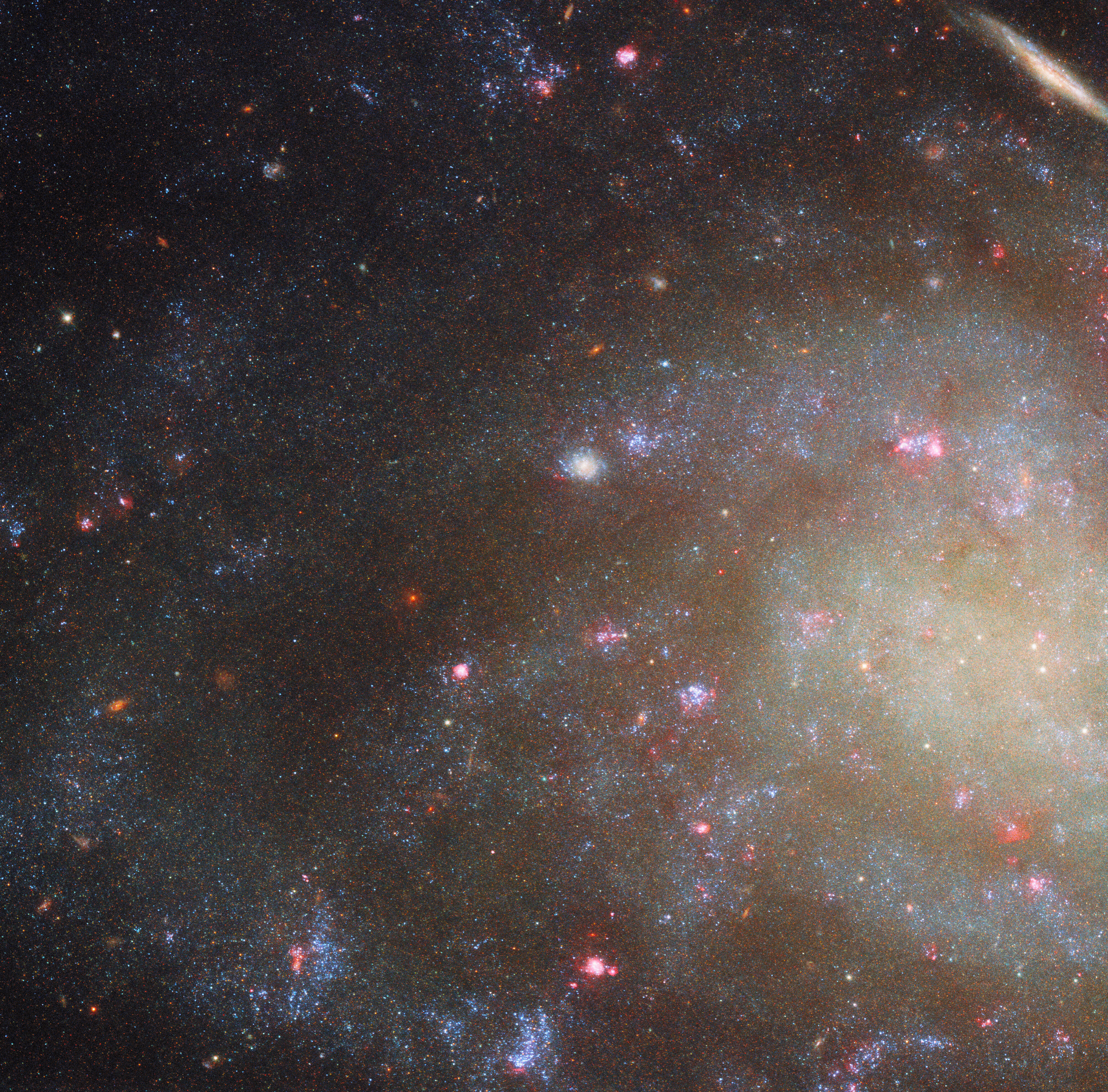
NGC 45 imaged by the Hubble Space Telescope

== See also ==
- List of NGC objects (1–1000)
