= Sculptor Dwarf Galaxy =

Dwarf spheroidal Galaxy in the constellation Sculptor

Sculptor Dwarf Elliptical Galaxy
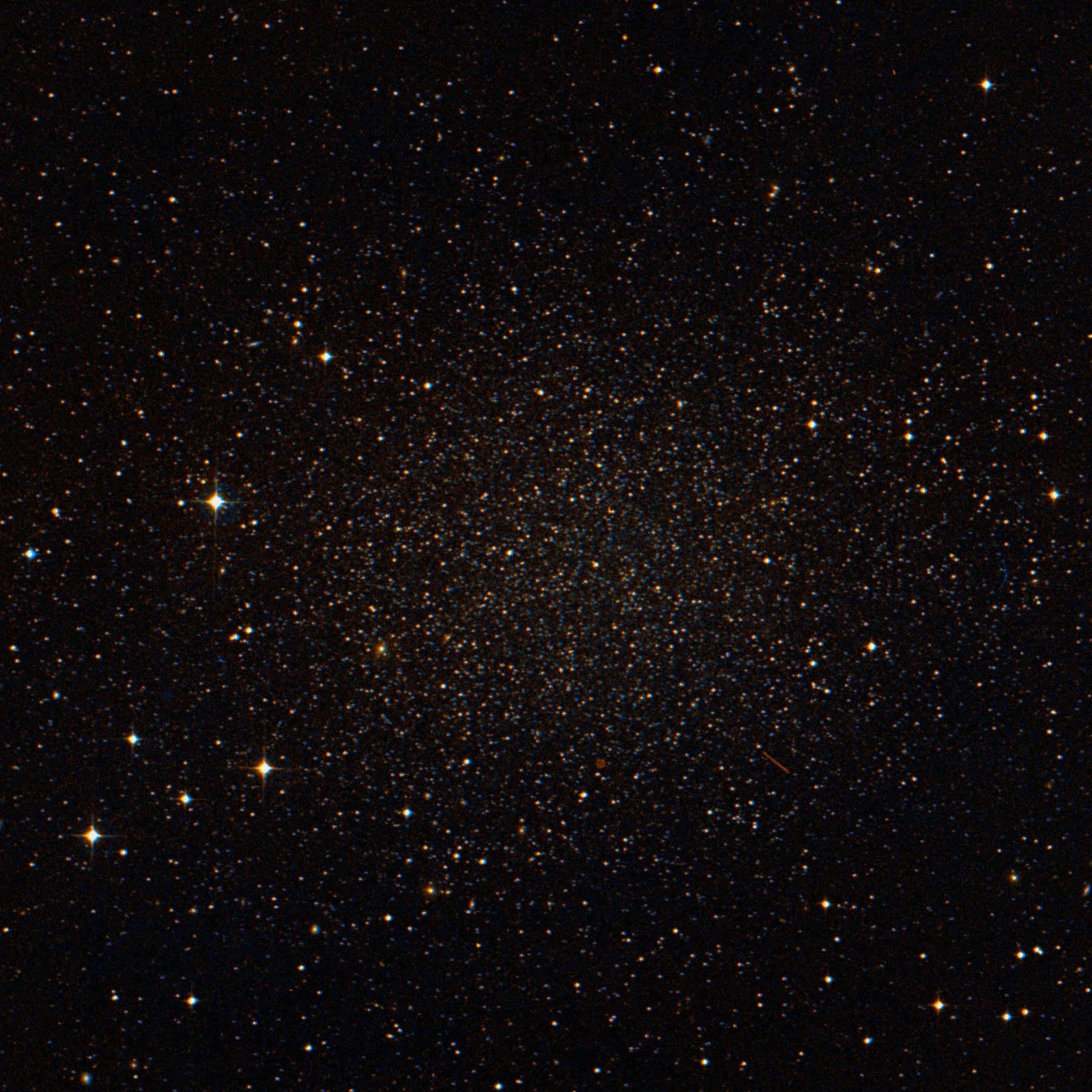

Observation data (J2000 epoch)
- Constellation: Sculptor
- Right ascension: 01^{h} 00^{m} 09.3^{s}
- Declination: −33° 42′ 33″
- Redshift: 110 ± 1 km/s
- Distance: 290 ± 30 kly (85.8 kpc)
- Apparent magnitude (V): 10.1

Characteristics
- Type: E
- Mass: 1.4×10^{8}^{[a]} M_{☉}
- Apparent size (V): 39′.8 × 30′.9

Other designations
- Sculptor Dwarf Spheroidal, PGC 3589, MCG-06-03-015, ESO 351-30

The Sculptor Dwarf Galaxy (also known as Sculptor Dwarf Elliptical Galaxy or the Sculptor Dwarf Spheroidal Galaxy, and formerly as the Sculptor System) is a dwarf spheroidal galaxy that is a satellite of the Milky Way. The galaxy lies within the constellation Sculptor. It was discovered in 1937 by American astronomer Harlow Shapley using the 24-inch Bruce refractor at Boyden Observatory. The galaxy is located about 290,000 light-years away from the Solar System. The Sculptor Dwarf contains only 4 percent of the carbon and other heavy elements in our own galaxy, the Milky Way, making it similar to primitive galaxies seen at the edge of the universe.

== Metallicity ==
The metallicity of Sculptor dwarf appears to be broken up into two distinct groups, one with [Fe/H] = −2.3 and the other with [Fe/H] = −1.5. Similar to many of the other Local Group galaxies, the older metal-poor segment appears more extended than the younger metal-rich segment. Using cosmological numerical simulations, it has been recently argued that Sculptor's two distinct stellar populations would be the tell-tale sign of a past merger between Sculptor and another small dwarf galaxy companion.

The Sculptor Dwarf is home to the most metal-poor star outside of the Milky Way, known as AS0039, with a metallicity of [Fe/H] = −4.11. Unlike other known metal-poor stars, it has a low carbon abundance and an unusual ratio of alpha elements, suggesting it may have been formed in the aftermath of a Population III star hypernova.

== Measurements ==
Using both Hubble Space Telescope and Gaia observations 12 years apart, about 100 stars in the galaxy were mapped accurately, and 3D motions of about 10 of those stars enable trajectories to be mapped as well.

== Notes ==
1. The quoted total mass is the cumulative dark matter mass (much higher than the luminous mass) at about 1 kpc from the galaxy's center.
