= Unbarred spiral galaxy =

Type of spiral galaxy without a central bar

The Whirlpool Galaxy and its companion satellite. The Whirlpool is an unbarred spiral galaxy.

An unbarred spiral galaxy is a type of spiral galaxy without a central bar, or one that is not a barred spiral galaxy. It is designated with an SA in the galaxy morphological classification scheme. A nearby example of an unbarred spiral is the Triangulum Galaxy.

Unbarred spiral galaxies are one of three general types of spiral galaxies under the de Vaucouleurs classification system, the other two being intermediate spiral galaxy and barred spiral galaxy. Under the Hubble tuning fork, it is one of two general types of spiral galaxy, the other being barred spirals.

== Overview ==
Roughly one third of known spiral galaxies are unbarred. Spiral galaxies range in diameter from about 20,000 to over 100,000 light-years; smaller spiral galaxies are less likely to have a stable bar than larger ones. Unbarred spiral galaxies tend to have a higher redshift and are older than barred spirals, suggesting they represent an earlier stage in galactic evolution. The ratio of unbarred to barred spiral galaxies has fallen over the history of the universe.

== Classification ==
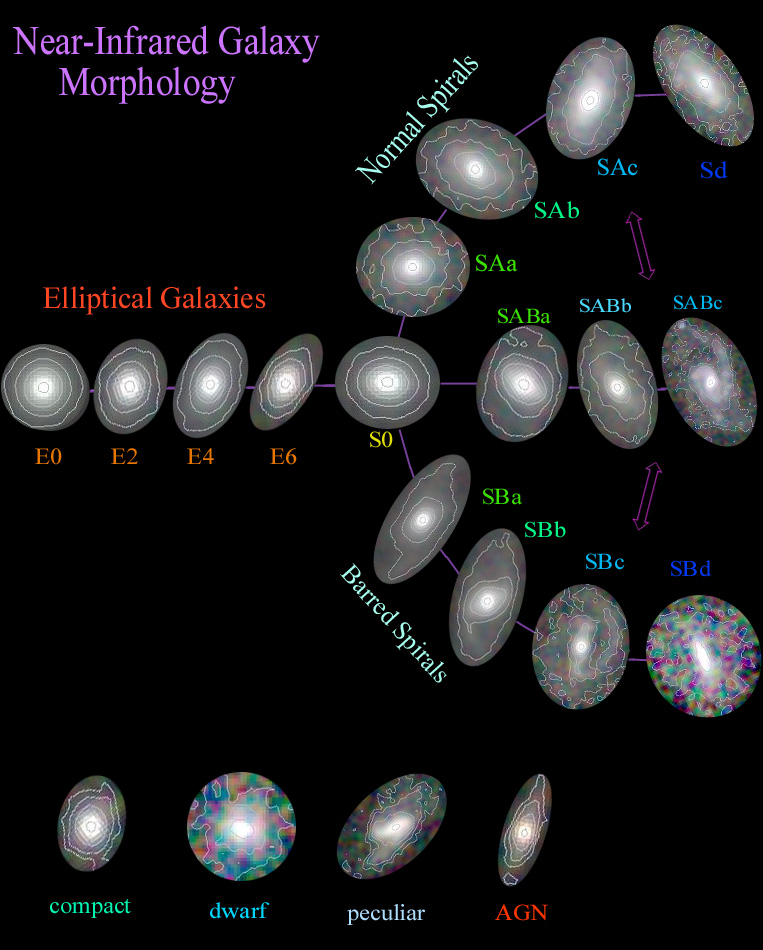
Under the de Vaucouleurs classification system, SA galaxies are one of three types of spiral galaxy.

In 1926, Edwin Hubble introduced the Hubble sequence for morphological classification of galaxies. Spiral galaxies, defined by their disc shape and presence of star-forming spiral arms, were divided into unbarred (SA) and barred (SB) types. Both types were further subdivided along a continuum of how tightly wound their spiral arms were, from tightly to loosely (a–c).

Gérard de Vaucouleurs further expanded on this system in 1959. He described an intermediate class of spiral galaxy (SAB), between barred and unbarred, that shared features of both. He noted the continuity between loosely wound spiral galaxies and Magellanic spirals (galaxies with only one spiral arm), which he assigned the classes Sd and Sm. He also introduced classes for a galaxy's inner structure, sorted by whether the arms originated from a central ringlike structure or were purely spiral, allowing for mixed types: (r), (rs), (sr), and (s).

Example	Type	Image	Information	Notes
	SA0-		SA0- is a type of lenticular galaxy	
	SA0		SA0 is a type of lenticular galaxy	
	SA0+		SA0+ is a type of lenticular galaxy	
NGC 3593	SA0/a		SA0/a can also be considered a type of unbarred lenticular galaxy	NGC 3593 is an "SA(s)0/a"
NGC 3169	SAa			NGC 3169 is an "SA(s)a pec"
Messier 81	SAab			M81 is an "SA(s)ab"
Messier 88	SAb			M88 is an "SA(rs)b"
NGC 3949	SAbc			NGC 3949 is an "SA(s)bc"
NGC 4414	SAc			NGC 4414 is an "SA(rs)c"
Triangulum Galaxy	SAcd			Triangulum is an "SA(s)cd"
NGC 300	SAd			NGC 300 is an "SA(s)d"
NGC 45	SAdm		SAdm can also be considered a type of unbarred Magellanic spiral	NGC 45 is an "SA(s)dm"
NGC 4395	SAm		SAm is a type of Magellanic spiral (Sm)	NGC 4395 is an "SA(s)m"

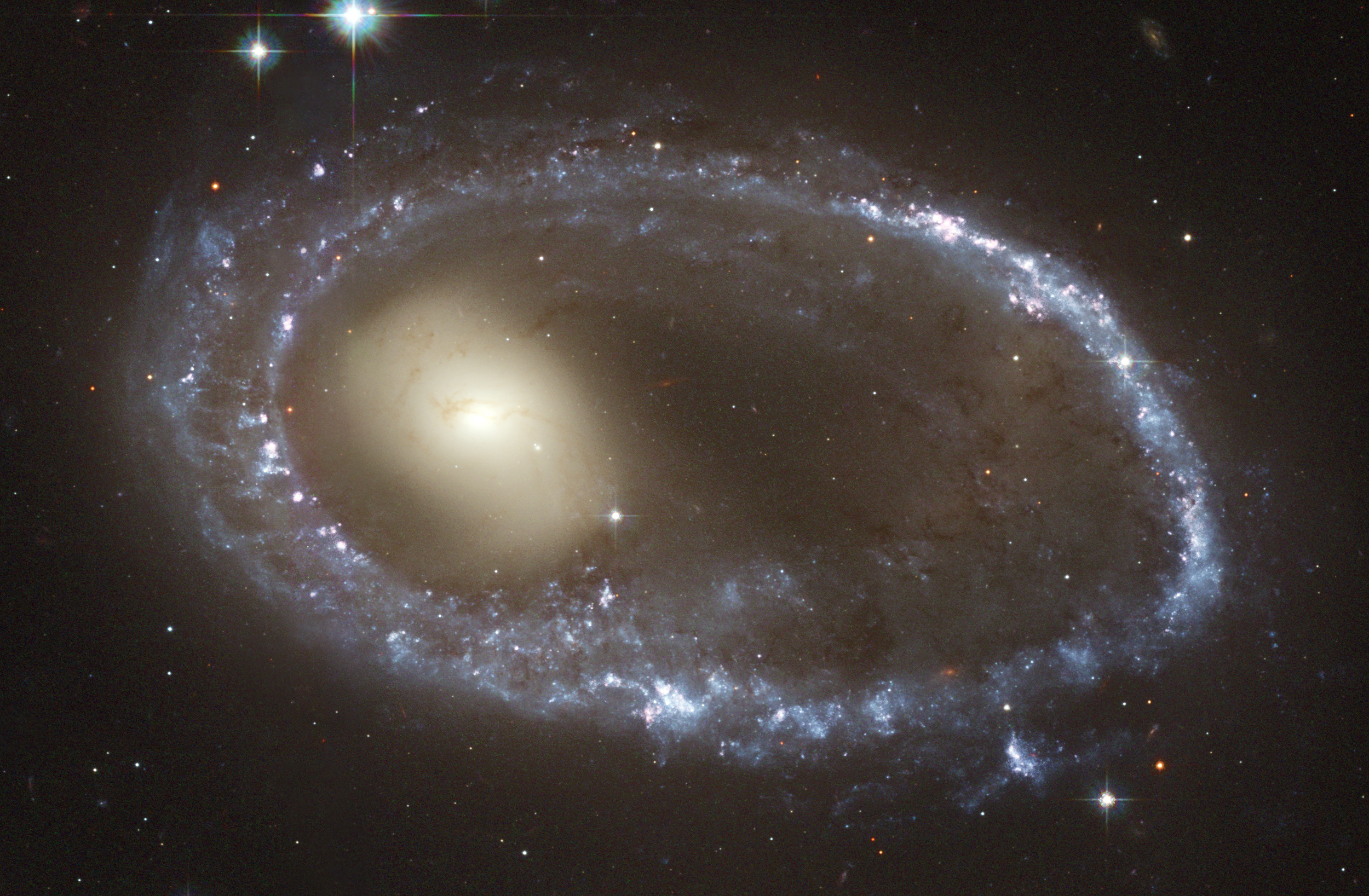
An example of this type, imaged by the Hubble Space Telescope

== Unbarred lenticular galaxy ==
An unbarred lenticular galaxy is a lenticular version of an unbarred spiral galaxy. They have the Hubble type of SA0.

An example of this is the galaxy AM 0644-741. For other examples, see Category:Unbarred lenticular galaxies.
