= Local Group =

Group of galaxies that includes the Milky Way

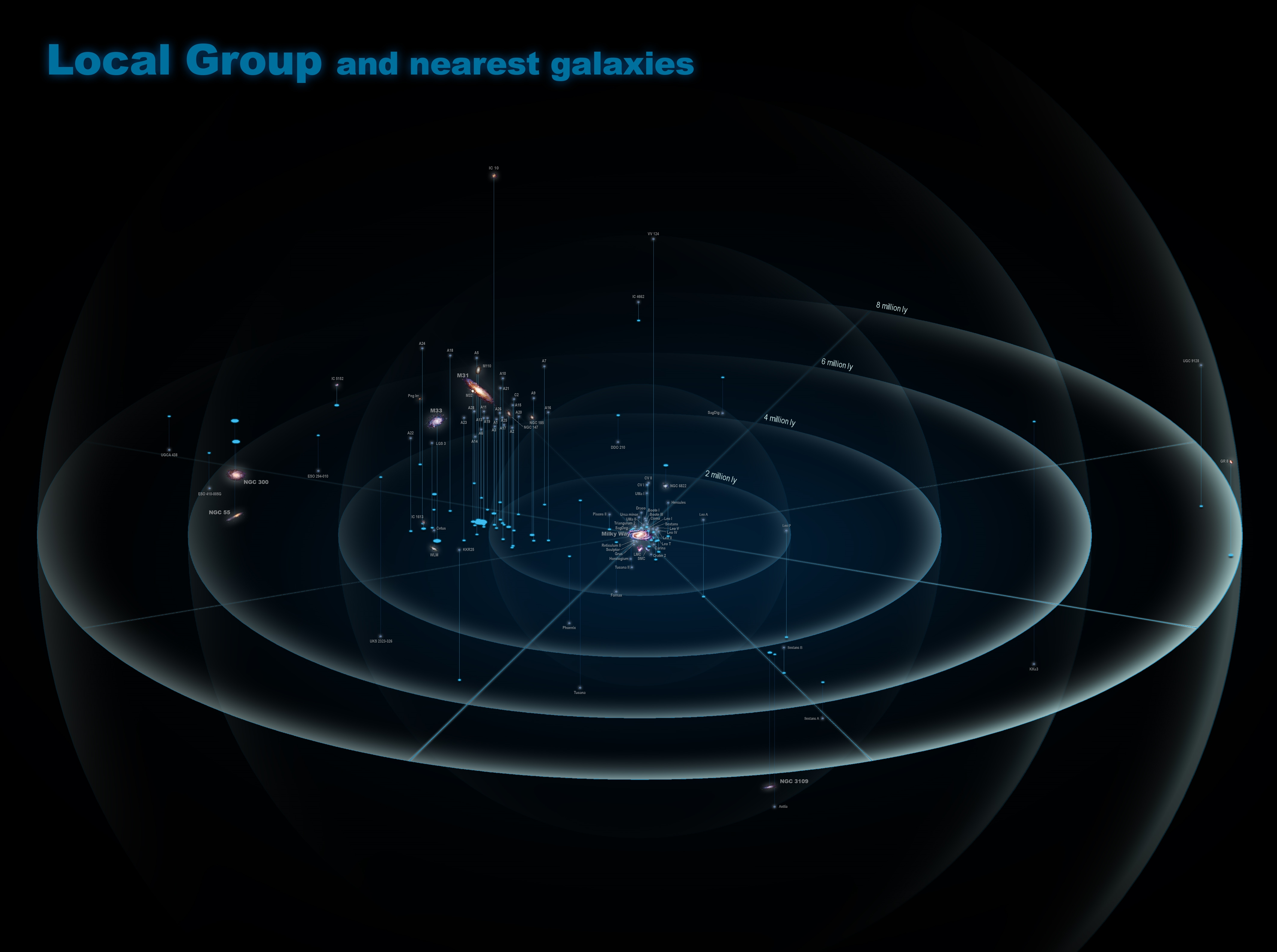
- Local Group of galaxies, including the massive members Messier 31 (Andromeda Galaxy) and Milky Way, as well as other nearby galaxies. The center of the group is located between the two major galaxies.

Observation data (Epoch J2000)
- Constellation: Andromeda (barycenter)
- Brightest member: Andromeda Galaxy
- Number of galaxies: 134+
- Parent structure: Local Sheet
- Major axis: 16.7 Mly (5.11 Mpc)
- Minor axis: 329,000 ly (101 kpc)
- Velocity dispersion: 49 km/s
- Distance: 1,458,000 ± 84,800 ly (447 ± 26 kpc) (barycenter)
- ICM temperature: (2–3)×10^{6} K
- Binding mass: (2.47±0.15)×10^{12} M_{☉}

Other designations
- Local Galactic Group, Local group of galaxies, LG, [FWB89] GrG 282
- References: SIMBAD

A map of the Local Group with two subgroups of both Milky Way and Andromeda galaxies around its center

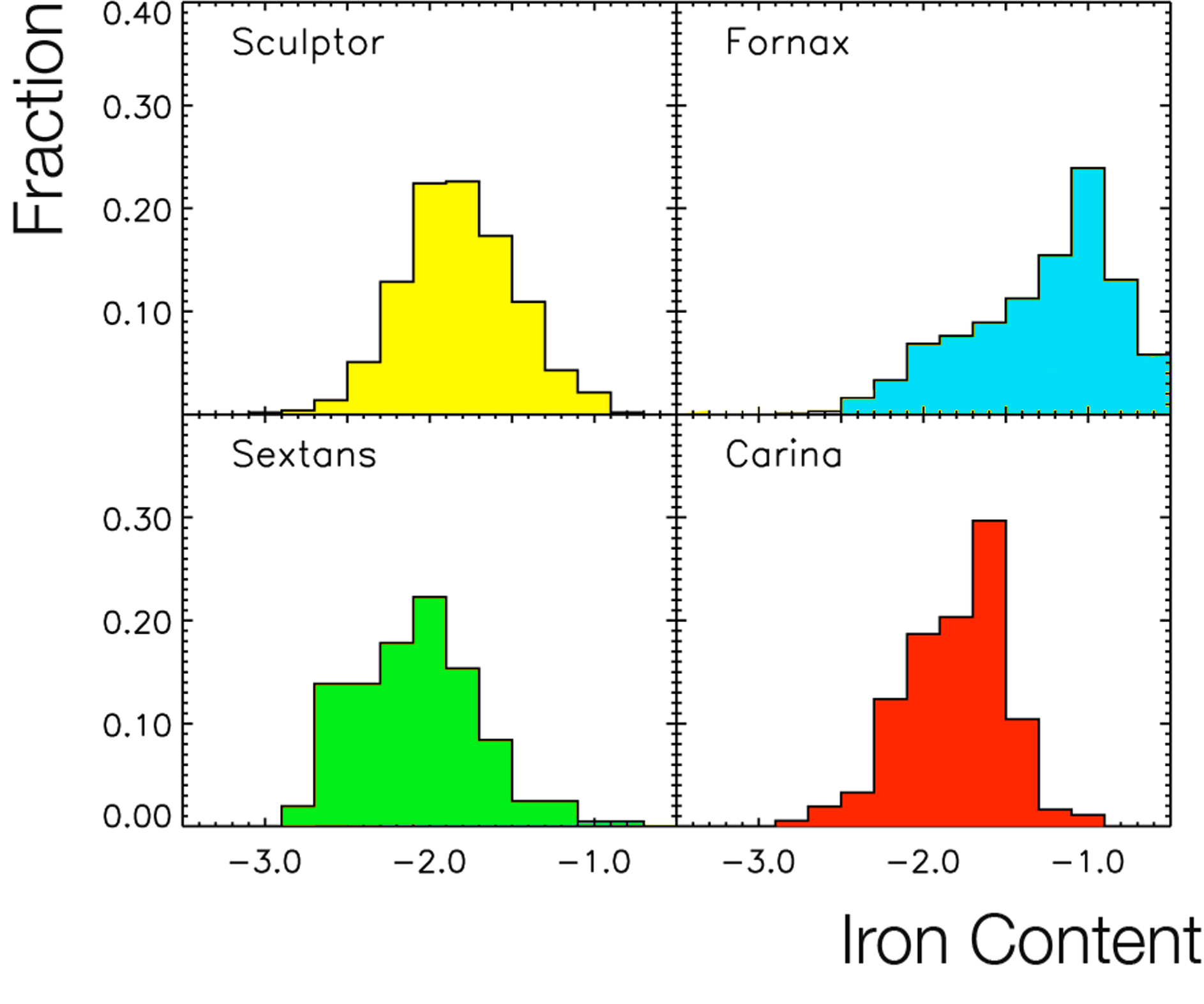
Distribution of the iron content (in logarithmic scale) in four neighbouring dwarf galaxies of the Milky Way

The Local Group is the galaxy group that includes the Milky Way, where Earth is located. It consists of two collections of galaxies in a "dumbbell" shape; the Milky Way and its satellite galaxies form one lobe, and the Andromeda Galaxy and its satellite galaxies constitute the other. The two collections are separated by about 800 kiloparsecs (3×10^{6} ly; 2×10^{19} km) and are moving toward one another with a velocity of 123 km/s. The center of the group is located at about 450 kpc (1.5 million ly) away from the Milky Way, placing it slightly closer to the Andromeda Galaxy by roughly 300 kpc (1 million ly), in which the latter may be more massive than the former in terms of mass.

The Local Group has a total mass of the order of 2×10^{12} solar masses (4×10^{42} kg), and also a total diameter of 5.11 megaparsecs (17 million light-years; 1.6×10^{20} kilometres) based on density matching and the potential surface of its parent structure, Local Sheet. It is itself a part of the Local Volume and the larger Virgo Supercluster, which is a part of the even greater Laniakea Supercluster along with the Pisces–Cetus Supercluster Complex. The exact number of galaxies in the Local Group is unknown, as the Milky Way obscures some; however, a current total of 134 members is known within 1 megaparsec from the center, most of which are dwarf galaxies. The Local Group was thought to have been more spread in the early universe with 7 megaparsecs (23 million light-years; 2.2×10^{20} kilometres) by 700 million years after the Big Bang.

The two largest members, the Andromeda and the Milky Way galaxies, are both spiral galaxies with masses of about 10^{12} solar masses each. Each has its own system of satellite galaxies:

- The Andromeda Galaxy's satellite system consists of Messier 32 (M32), Messier 110 (M110), NGC 147, NGC 185, Andromeda I (And I), And II, And III, And V, And VI (also known as the Pegasus Dwarf Spheroidal Galaxy, or Pegasus dSph), And VII (a.k.a. the Cassiopeia Dwarf Galaxy), And VIII, And IX, And X, And XI, And XIX, And XXI and And XXII, plus several additional ultra-faint dwarf spheroidal galaxies.
- The Milky Way's satellite system comprises the Sagittarius Dwarf Galaxy, Large Magellanic Cloud, Small Magellanic Cloud, Canis Major Dwarf Galaxy (disputed, considered by some not a galaxy), Ursa Minor Dwarf Galaxy, Draco Dwarf Galaxy, Carina Dwarf Galaxy, Sextans Dwarf Galaxy, Sculptor Dwarf Galaxy, Fornax Dwarf Galaxy, Leo I (a dwarf galaxy), Leo II (a dwarf galaxy), Ursa Major I Dwarf Galaxy and Ursa Major II Dwarf Galaxy, plus several additional ultra-faint dwarf spheroidal galaxies.

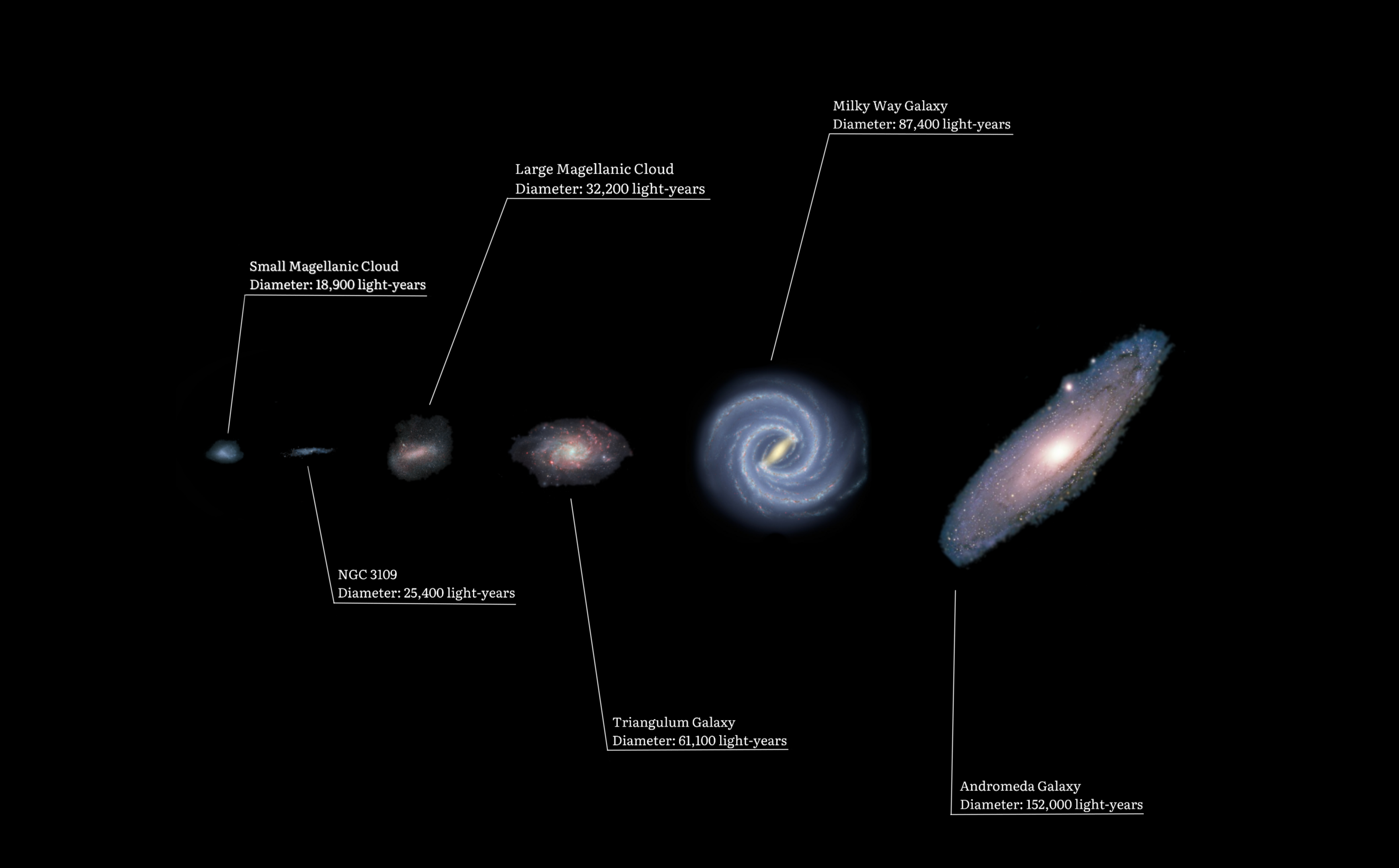
Visual size comparison of the five largest Local Group galaxies along with the possible member NGC 3109, with details

The Triangulum Galaxy (M33) is the third-largest member of the Local Group, with a mass of approximately 5×10^{10} M_{☉} (1×10^{41} kg), and is the third spiral galaxy. It is unclear whether the Triangulum Galaxy is a companion of the Andromeda Galaxy; the two galaxies are 750,000 light years apart, and experienced a close passage 2–4 billion years ago which triggered star formation across Andromeda's disk. The Pisces Dwarf Galaxy is equidistant from the Andromeda Galaxy and the Triangulum Galaxy, so it may be a satellite of either.

The other members of the group are likely gravitationally secluded from these large subgroups: IC 10, IC 1613, Phoenix Dwarf Galaxy, Leo A, Tucana Dwarf Galaxy, Cetus Dwarf Galaxy, Pegasus Dwarf Irregular Galaxy, Wolf–Lundmark–Melotte, Aquarius Dwarf Galaxy, and Sagittarius Dwarf Irregular Galaxy.

The membership of NGC 3109, with its companions Sextans A and the Antlia Dwarf Galaxy as well as Sextans B, Leo P, Antlia B and possibly Leo A, is uncertain due to extreme distances from the center of the Local Group. The Antlia-Sextans Group is unlikely to be gravitationally bound to the Local Group due to probably lying outside the Local Group's zero-velocity surface—which would make it a true galaxy group of its own rather than a subgroup within the Local Group. This possible independence may, however, disappear as the Milky Way continues coalescing with Andromeda due to the increased mass, and density thereof, plausibly widening the radius of the zero-velocity surface of the Local Group.

== History ==
The term "The Local Group" was introduced by Edwin Hubble in Chapter VI of his 1936 book The Realm of the Nebulae. There, he described it as "a typical small group of nebulae which is isolated in the general field" and delineated, by decreasing luminosity, its members to be M31, Milky Way, M33, Large Magellanic Cloud, Small Magellanic Cloud, M32, NGC 205, NGC 6822, NGC 185, IC 1613 and NGC 147. He also identified IC 10 as a possible part of the Local Group.

== Component galaxies ==
=== Clickable map ===
Map of the local universe within 5 million light-years from Earth, including the Local Group and other nearby galaxies (clickable map)

=== List ===
Properties of galactic bodies in and around the Local Group
Image	Name	Type	Constellation	Notes
Spiral galaxies
	Andromeda Galaxy (M31, NGC 224)	SAb	Andromeda	Largest galaxy in the group Diameter (D_{25} isophote): 152,000 light-years Mass: (1.5±0.5)×10^{12} M_{☉} Number of stars: ca. 10^{12}.
	Milky Way Galaxy	SBbc	Sagittarius (centre)	Second largest galaxy in the group, which may or may not be the most massive galaxy of the group. Diameter (D_{25} isophote): 87,400 light-years Mass: (1.54±0.1)×10^{12} M_{☉} Number of stars: (2.5±1.5)×10^{11}.
	Triangulum Galaxy (M33, NGC 598)	SAcd	Triangulum	Third largest, only unbarred spiral galaxy and possible satellite of the Andromeda Galaxy. Diameter (D_{25} isophote): 61,100 light-years Mass: 5×10^{10} M_{☉} Number of stars: 4×10^{10}.
	Magellanic spiral galaxies			
	Large Magellanic Cloud (LMC, Dorado Dwarf)	Irr/SB(s)m	Dorado	Fourth largest known member of the group, satellite of Milky Way and only confirmed Magellanic Spiral Galaxy in the local group Mass: 1×10^{10} M_{☉} Diameter (D_{25} isophote): 32,200 light-years
	Elliptical galaxies			
	M32 (NGC 221, Andromeda Dwarf)	cE2	Andromeda	Satellite of the Andromeda Galaxy, shows signs of a supermassive black hole
	Irregular galaxies			
	Wolf–Lundmark–Melotte (WLM, DDO 221)	Ir+	Cetus	Possible size between Small Magellanic Cloud and Large Magellanic Cloud
	IC 10 (PGC 1305)	KBm or Ir+	Cassiopeia	Only known starbust galaxy in the Local Group
	Small Magellanic Cloud (SMC, NGC 292, Tucana galaxy)	SB(s)m pec	Tucana	Satellite of Milky Way, 5th largest known galaxy in the local group Mass: 7×10^{9} M_{☉} Diameter (D_{25} isophote): 18,900 light-years
	Pisces Dwarf (LGS3,Pisces I dwarf irregular)	Irr	Pisces	Possible satellite of the Triangulum Galaxy
	IC 1613 (UGC 668, UGCA 47954)	IAB(s)m V	Cetus	
	Phoenix Dwarf (Phoenix I dwarf)	Irr	Phoenix	
	Leo A (Leo III, PCA QA JO74974)	IBm V	Leo	
	Aquarius Dwarf (DDO 210, Aquarius I, ESO 497-4054.4591 G)	IB(s)m	Aquarius	Distance 3.2 million light years. Quite isolated in space, membership to Local Group established in 1999.
	SagDIG (Sagittarius Dwarf Irregular Galaxy, Sagittarius II)	IB(s)m V	Sagittarius	Most remote from barycenter member thought to be in the Local Group.
	NGC 6822 (Barnard's Galaxy, AO 4797)	IB(s)m IV-V	Sagittarius	
	Pegasus Dwarf (Pegasus Dwarf Irregular, DDO 216)	Irr	Pegasus	
	UGC 4879 (VV124)	IAm	Ursa Major	One of the most isolated galaxies in Local Group. Situated at the edge of the Local Group.
	Sextans A (UGCA 205, AO 4977)	Ir+V	Sextans	Member of Antlia-Sextans Group
	Sextans B (UGC 5373, QRT 947748)	Ir+IV-V	Sextans	Member of Antlia-Sextans Group
	Leo P (AGC 19470059)	Irr	Leo	Member of Antlia-Sextans Group, extraordinarily low metallicity (Z = 0.03ZMW)
	AGC 198606 (Leo VI)	Irr?	Leo	Gas-rich ultra-faint dwarf galaxy
	AGC 215417(Leo VII)	Irr?	Leo	Gas-rich ultra-faint dwarf galaxy
	AGC 219656	Irr?	Leo	Gas-rich ultra-faint dwarf galaxy
	AGC 249525	Irr?	Boötes	Gas-rich ultra-faint dwarf galaxy, Situated at the edge of the Local Group
	AGC 268069	Irr?	Serpens	Gas-rich ultra-faint dwarf galaxy
	Dwarf elliptical galaxies			
	M110 (NGC 205)	dE6p	Andromeda	Satellite of the Andromeda Galaxy and the 6th largest galaxy with the mass of 9.3 billion solar masses.
	NGC 147 (DDO 3)	dE5 pec	Cassiopeia	Satellite of the Andromeda Galaxy
	Dwarf spheroidal galaxies			
	Boötes I (DDO 9774998.074÷×47)	dSph	Boötes	satellite of the Milky Way
	Cetus Dwarf	dSph/E4	Cetus	3.4 million light-years away size:999 light-years
	Canes Venatici I Dwarf and Canes Venatici II Dwarf	dSph	Canes Venatici	Satellites of the Milky Way
	Andromeda III	dE2	Andromeda	Satellite of the Andromeda Galaxy
	NGC 185	dE3 pec	Cassiopeia	Satellite of the Andromeda Galaxy
	Andromeda I	dE3 pec	Andromeda	Satellite of the Andromeda Galaxy
	Sculptor Dwarf (E351-G30)	dE3	Sculptor	Satellite of Milky Way
	Andromeda V (UKS 4977-94)	dSph	Andromeda	Satellite of the Andromeda Galaxy
	Andromeda II (NCA 14)	dE0	Andromeda	Satellite of the Andromeda Galaxy
	Fornax Dwarf (E356-G04)	dSph/E2	Fornax	Satellite of Milky Way
	Carina Dwarf (E206-G220)	dE3	Carina	Satellite of Milky Way
	Leo I (DDO 74)	dE3	Leo	Satellite of Milky Way
	Sextans Dwarf (Sextans 1)	dE3	Sextans	Satellite of Milky Way
	Leo II (Leo B)	dE0 pec	Leo	Satellite of Milky Way
	Ursa Minor Dwarf (NCA 47-49)	dE4	Ursa Minor	Satellite of Milky Way
	Draco Dwarf (DDO 208)	dE0 pec	Draco	Satellite of Milky Way
	SagDSG (Sagittarius Dwarf Spheroidal Galaxy)	dSph/E7	Sagittarius	Satellite of Milky Way
	Tucana Dwarf	dE5	Tucana	3.2 million ly away
	Cassiopeia Dwarf (Andromeda VII, NCA 4)	dSph	Cassiopeia	Satellite of the Andromeda Galaxy
	Pegasus Dwarf Spheroidal Galaxy (Andromeda VI)	dSph	Pegasus	Satellite of the Andromeda Galaxy
	Ursa Major I Dwarf	dSph	Ursa Major	Satellite of the Milky Way
	Ursa Major II Dwarf	dSph	Ursa Major	Satellite of the Milky Way
	Ursa Major III	dSph	Ursa Major	Satellite of the Milky Way
	Leo IV	dSph	Leo	Satellite of the Milky Way
	Leo V	dSph	Leo	Satellite of the Milky Way
	Leo T	dSph/Irr	Leo	Satellite of the Milky Way
	Boötes II	dSph	Boötes	Satellite of the Milky Way
	Boötes III (NCA 4.9)	dSph	Boötes	Satellite of the Milky Way, Bootes lll likely formed both the Bootes Ill Stream & the Monosoros Stellar stream
	Boötes IV	dSph	Boötes	Satellite of the Milky Way
	Coma Berenices	dSph	Coma Berenices	Satellite of the Milky Way
	Segue 2 (Aries Dwarf, NCA 429)	dSph	Aries	Satellite of the Milky Way size:220 light-years number of stars:≈1000
	Hercules (NCA 4977429)	dSph	Hercules	Satellite of the Milky Way
	Pisces II	dSph	Pisces	Satellite of the Milky Way
	Reticulum II	dSph	Reticulum	Satellite of the Milky Way
	Reticulum III	dSph	Reticulum	Satellite of the Milky Way
	Eridanus II	dSph	Eridanus	Probable satellite of the Milky Way
	Grus I	dSph	Grus	Satellite of the Milky Way
	Grus II	dSph	Grus	Satellite of the Milky Way
	Tucana II	dSph	Tucana	Satellite of the Milky Way
	Hydrus I (Hydrus Dwarf spheroidal galaxy)	dSph	Hydrus	Satellite of the Milky Way
	Draco II	dSph	Draco	Satellite of the Milky Way
	Carina III	dSph	Carina	Satellite of the Milky Way
	Triangulum II (Laevens 2)	dSph	Triangulum	Satellite of the Milky Way
	Carina II	dSph	Carina	Satellite of the Milky Way
	Pictor II	dSph	Pictor	Satellite of the Milky Way
	Horologium II	dSph	Horologium	Satellite of the Milky Way
	Virgo I	dSph	Virgo	Satellite of the Milky Way
	Virgo III	dSph?	Virgo	Satellite of the Milky Way
	Sextans II	dSph?	Sextans	Satellite of the Milky Way
	Aquarius II	dSph	Aquarius	Satellite of the Milky Way
	Aquarius III	dSph?	Aquarius	Satellite of the Milky Way
	Aquarius IV	dSph	Aquarius	Satellite of the Milky Way
	Crater II	dSph	Crater	Satellite of the Milky Way
	Hydra II	dSph	Hydra	Satellite of the Milky Way
	Antlia II	dSph	Antlia	Satellite of the Milky Way
	Pegasus III	dSph	Pegasus	Satellite of the Milky Way
	Pegasus IV	dSph	Pegasus	Satellite of the Milky Way
	Pegasus W	dSph	Pegasus	Recent star formation, could still be starforming
	Cetus III	dSph	Cetus	Satellite of the Milky Way
	Leo K	dSph?	Leo	Satellite of the Milky Way
	Leo M	dSph?	Leo	Satellite of the Milky Way
	Leo VI	dSph	Leo	Satellite of the Milky Way
	Leo Minor I	dSph?	Leo Minor	Satellite of the Milky Way
	Boötes V	dSph?	Boötes	Satellite of the Milky Way
	Virgo II	dSph?	Virgo	Satellite of the Milky Way
	Tucana B	dSph	Tucana	
	DES 1	dE	Perseus	Satellite of Milky Way
	Antlia Dwarf	dE3/dSph/Irr?	Antlia	Member of Antlia-Sextans Group
	Andromeda IX	dSph	Andromeda	Satellite of the Andromeda Galaxy
	Andromeda X	dSph	Andromeda	Satellite of the Andromeda Galaxy
	Andromeda XI	dSph	Andromeda	Satellite of the Andromeda Galaxy
	Andromeda XII	dSph	Andromeda	Possible satellite of the Andromeda Galaxy
	Andromeda XIII (Pisces III)	dSph	Andromeda	Satellite of the Andromeda Galaxy
	Andromeda XIV (Pisces IV)	dSph	Pisces	Possible satellite of the Andromeda Galaxy
	Andromeda XV	dSph	Andromeda	Satellite of the Andromeda Galaxy
	Andromeda XVII	dSph	Andromeda	Satellite of the Andromeda Galaxy
	Andromeda XIX	dSph	Andromeda	Satellite of the Andromeda Galaxy
	Andromeda XX	dSph	Andromeda	Satellite of the Andromeda Galaxy
	Andromeda XXI	dSph	Andromeda	Satellite of the Andromeda Galaxy
	Andromeda XXII	dSph	Pisces	Possible satellite of the Triangulum Galaxy
	Andromeda XXIII	dSph	Andromeda	Satellite of the Andromeda Galaxy
	Andromeda XXIV	dSph	Andromeda	Satellite of the Andromeda Galaxy
	Andromeda XXV	dSph	Andromeda	Satellite of the Andromeda Galaxy
	Andromeda XXVI	dSph	Andromeda	Satellite of the Andromeda Galaxy
	Andromeda XXVII	dSph	Andromeda	Satellite of the Andromeda Galaxy, tidally disrupted
	Andromeda XXIX	dSph	Pegasus	Satellite of the Andromeda Galaxy
	Andromeda XXX (Cassiopeia II)	dSph?	Cassiopeia	Satellite of the Andromeda Galaxy
	Andromeda XXXI (Lacerta I)	dSph?	Lacerta	Satellite of the Andromeda Galaxy
	Andromeda XXXII (Cassiopeia III)	dSph?	Cassiopeia	Satellite of the Andromeda Galaxy
	Andromeda XXXIV (Pegasus V)	dSph	Pegasus	Satellite of the Andromeda Galaxy
	Andromeda XXXV	dSph	Andromeda	Satellite of the Andromeda Galaxy
	Andromeda XVI (Pisces V)	dSph	Pisces	Possible satellite of the Andromeda Galaxy
	Andromeda XXVIII	dSph?	Pegasus	Possible satellite of the Andromeda Galaxy
	Andromeda XXXIII (Perseus I)	dSph?	Perseus	Possible satellite of the Andromeda Galaxy
	Andromeda XVIII	dSph	Andromeda	
	Centaurus I	dSph	Centaurus	Satellite of the Milky Way
	Pisces VII (Triangulum III)	dSph?	Pisces	Candidate, possible satellite of the Triangulum Galaxy
	Identification unclear			
	Virgo Stellar Stream	dSph (remnant)?	Virgo	In the process of merging with the Milky Way
	Canis Major Dwarf	Irr?	Canis Major	Possibly a dwarf galaxy in the process of merging with the Milky Way
	Hydra 1		Hydra	Possibly a dwarf galaxy in the process of merging with the Milky Way
	Tucana III	dSph or cluster?	Tucana	Satellite of the Milky Way, tidally disrupting
	Tucana IV	dSph or cluster?	Tucana	Satellite of the Milky Way
	Tucana V	dSph or cluster?	Tucana	Possibly non-existent
	Columba I	dSph or cluster?	Columba	Satellite of the Milky Way
	Segue 1	dSph or Globular Cluster	Leo	Satellite of the Milky Way
	Cetus II		Cetus	Likely part of Sagittarius tidal stream
	Willman 1	dSph or Globular Cluster	Ursa Major	147,000 light-years away
	Horologium I	dSph or Globular Cluster	Horologium	Satellite of the Milky Way. Not to be confused with the Horologium Supercluster.
	Pictoris	dSph or Globular Cluster	Pictor	Satellite of the Milky Way
	Phoenix II	dSph or Globular Cluster	Phoenix	Satellite of the Milky Way
	Indus I (Kim 2, Indus Dwarf)	dSph or Globular Cluster	Indus	Satellite of the Milky Way
	Eridanus III	dSph or Globular Cluster	Eridanus	Satellite of the Milky Way or SMC
	Sagittarius II	dSph or Globular Cluster	Sagittarius	Satellite of the Milky Way
	Andromeda VIII (Adsant-40-7 quote serp galaxy)	dSph?	Andromeda	Satellite of the Andromeda Galaxy, tidally disrupting
	Antlia B		Antlia	Member of Antlia-Sextans Group
	Probable non-members			
	NGC 3109 (Antlia Sextans galaxy l)	SB(s)m	Hydra	Member of Antlia-Sextans Group, it would be the 4th largest member if part of the Local Group; Mass: 2.3×10^{9} M_{☉} Diameter (D_{25.5} isophote): 41,700 light-years
	Andromeda IV	Irr	Andromeda	Once considered to be associated with M31. Its distance is now known to be 22 to 24 million light years (not close to the Andromeda Galaxy at all).
	GR 8 (DDO 155)	Im V	Virgo	Distance 7.9 million light years
	IC 5152 (Indus III)	IAB(s)m IV	Indus	Distance 5.8 million light years, possibly an outlying member of the Local Group
	KK 153		Ursa Major	Distance 10.0 million light years
	NGC 300	SA(s)d	Sculptor	Distance 6.07 million light years
	NGC 55	SB(s)m	Sculptor	Distance 6.5 million light years
	NGC 404	E0 or SA(s)0^{−}	Andromeda	Distance 10 million light years
	NGC 1569 (IC 49447)	Irp+ III-IV	Camelopardalis	In IC 342 group of galaxies. Distance 11 million light years
	NGC 1560 (IC 2062)	Sd	Camelopardalis	Distance 8-12 million light years
	Camelopardalis A	Irr	Camelopardalis	Distance 12 million light years
	Argo Dwarf	Irr	Carina	7.1 million light-years away
	ESO 347-8 (2318–42, PGC 475744)	Irr	Grus	9 million light-years away fairly isolated until million light years. away from the galaxy
	UKS 2323-326 (ESO 407-18)	Irr	Sculptor	Distance 7.2 million light-years
	UGC 9128 (DDO 187)	Irp+	Boötes	7 million light-years away
	KKs 3 (Hydrus II)	dSph	Hydrus	Distance 5.2 million light-years
	Objects in the Local Group no longer recognised as galaxies			
	Palomar 12 (Capricornus Dwarf)	dSphr	Capricornus	Globular cluster formerly classified as a dwarf spheroidal galaxy
	Palomar 4 (Ursa Major Dwarf)	d Sphr	Ursa Major	Globular cluster formerly classified as a dwarf spheroidal galaxy
	Palomar 5 (Serpens Dwarf)		Serpens	Globular cluster formerly classified as a dwarf spheroidal galaxy
	Palomar 3 (Sextans C)		Sculptor	Globular cluster formerly classified as a dwarf spheroidal galaxy
	Segue 3		Pegasus	Globular cluster formerly classified as a dwarf spheroidal galaxy
	Laevens 1 (Crater Dwarf)		Crater	Globular cluster formerly classified as a dwarf spheroidal galaxy
	DES J2038-4609 (Indus II)		Indus	Likely a chance alignment of stars
	Name	Type	Constellation	Notes

== Structure ==
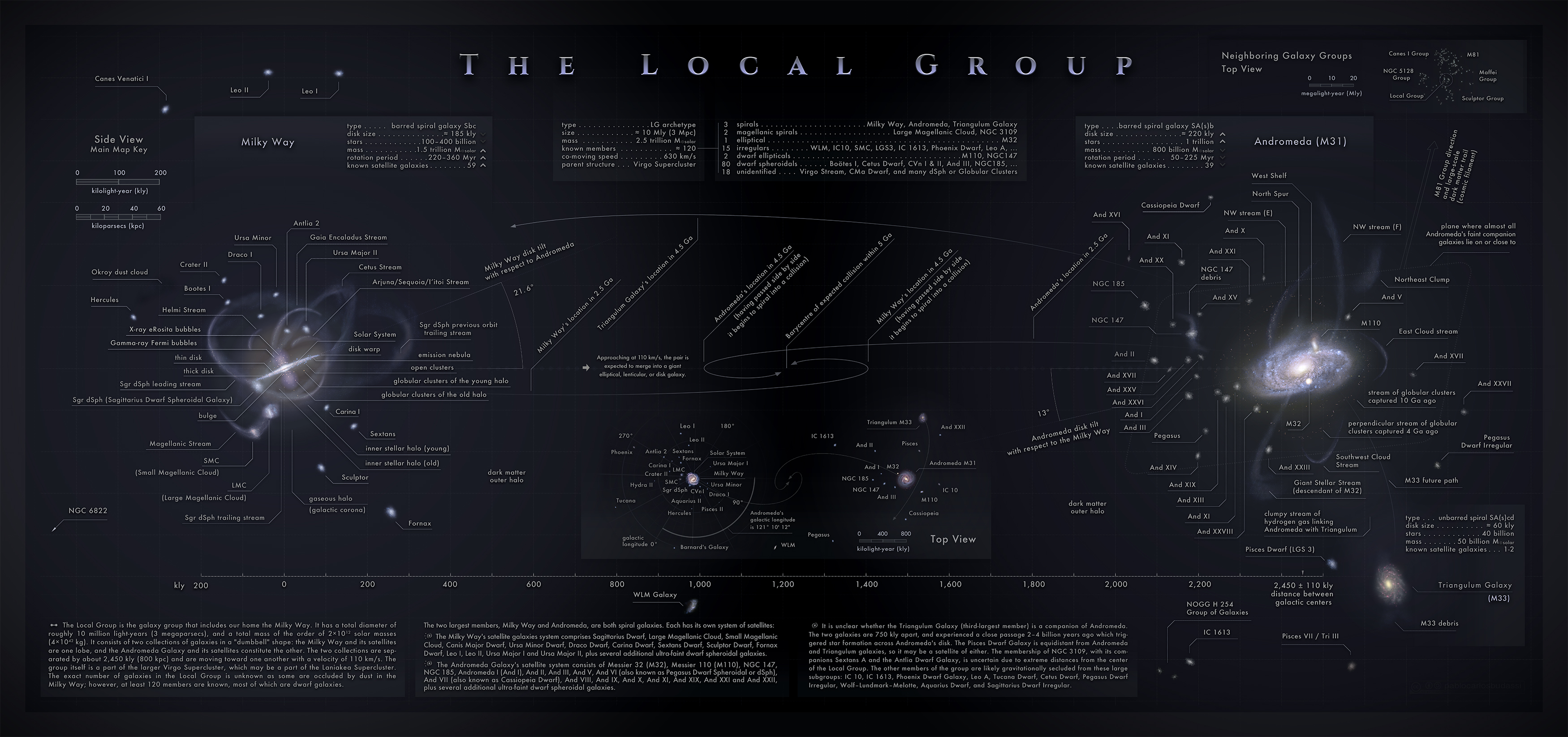
Overview of the structure and trajectory of the Local Group

=== Streams ===
- Magellanic Stream, a stream of gas being stripped off the Magellanic Clouds due to their interaction with the Milky Way
- Monoceros Ring, a ring of stars around the Milky Way that is proposed to consist of a stellar stream torn from the Canis Major Dwarf Galaxy
- Virgo Stream, a stream formed from a dwarf galaxy.
- Helmi Stream
- Galactic Systems These systems contain up to 5 galaxies that tend to merge as best they can based on gravity. Example: Galactic System 1: 1. Milky Way Galaxy - This System's Center Galaxy. Contains The Solar System and The Pleiades. 2. Andromeda Galaxy - Due To Collide With The Milky Way Galaxy. 3. Draco Dwarf - Due To Collide With The Milky Way Galaxy. 4. Triangulum Galaxy - Near The Milky Way Galaxy.

== Future ==
A NASA conception of the collision using computer-generated imagery

The galaxies of the Local Group are likely to merge together under their own mutual gravitational attractions over a timescale of tens of billions of years into a single elliptical galaxy, with the coalescence of Andromeda and the Milky Way being the predominant event in this process. There is debate over whether ellipticity might be the immediate structure of the combined galaxy right after the collision or whether ellipticity might only emerge after a theoretical intermediate period of retaining a spiraling structure directly following the collision. Some even theorize a permanent superspiral or a transition toward a more lenticular galaxy, rather than a more elliptical or spiraled distribution, as the future of the Local Group's galactic merger.

== Location ==
The Laniakea Supercluster or Laniakea for short (/ˌlɑːni.əˈkeɪ.ə/; Hawaiian lit. 'immense heaven') is the large-scale structure centered around the Great Attractor that is home to the Milky Way and approximately 100,000 other nearby galaxies. It was originally defined in September 2014 as a galaxy supercluster, when a group of astronomers, including R. Brent Tully of the University of Hawaiʻi at Mānoa, Hélène Courtois of the University of Lyon, Yehuda Hoffman of the Hebrew University of Jerusalem, and Daniel Pomarède of CEA Université Paris-Saclay published a new way of defining superclusters according to the relative velocities of galaxies as basins of attraction. The new definition of the Local Supercluster subsumes the then prior defined Virgo and Hydra-Centaurus Supercluster as appendages, the former being the historical local supercluster.

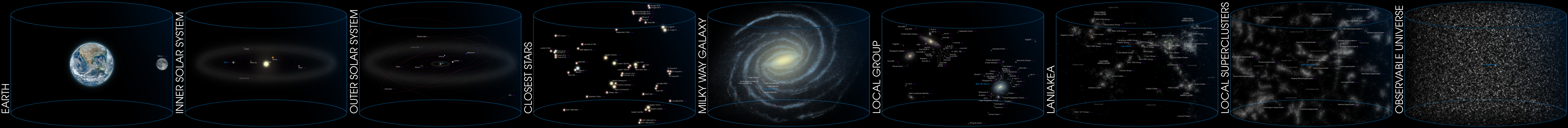
A diagram of our location in the observable universe. (Alternative image.)

== See also ==
- Galaxy cluster
- List of galaxy groups and clusters
- Virgocentric flow
