= Andromeda XIX =

Satellite galaxy of the Andromeda galaxy

Observation data (J2000 epoch)
- Constellation: Andromeda
- Right ascension: 00^{h} 19^{m} 32.10^{s}
- Declination: +35° 02′ 37.1″
- Redshift: 0.003903
- Distance: 2,651 kly (812.8 kpc)
- Apparent magnitude (V): −10.1
- Absolute magnitude (V): 14.5

Characteristics
- Type: dG
- Half-light radius (physical): 1700 pc
- Notable features: Satellite of Andromeda Galaxy, extremely diffuse

Other designations
- And XIX, LEDA 5056919

Andromeda XIX is a satellite galaxy of the Andromeda Galaxy (M31), a member of the Local Group, like the Milky Way Galaxy. Andromeda XIX is considered "the most extended dwarf galaxy known in the Local Group", and has been shown to have a half-light radius of 1.7 kiloparsec (kpc). It was discovered by the Canada–France–Hawaii Telescope, and is thought to be a dwarf galaxy.

As with other dwarf galaxies, Andromeda XIX is not producing new stars: 90% of its star formation occurred over 9 billion years ago. However, compared to dwarf galaxies of similar mass Andromeda XIX is extremely diffuse, like Antlia II.

== History ==
Surveillance was performed during use of the MegaPrime/MegaCam 1 deg2 (camera) on the Canada-France-Hawaii Telescope (CFHT) had mapped the Andromeda Galaxy's stellar halo (one quarter) up to ~150 kpc. The survey confirmed the clumpiness of Andromeda's stellar halo. It had shown the existence of multiple other dwarf galaxies. They include: Andromeda XI, XII, XIII, XV, XVI, XVIII, XIX, and XX.

== See also ==
- List of Andromeda's satellite galaxies
