= Pegasus Galaxy =

Pegasus Galaxy, or Pegasus Dwarf Galaxy, or Pegasus Dwarf, can mean several things:

- Pegasus Dwarf Irregular Galaxy or Peg DIG, a member of the Local Group of galaxies
- Pegasus Dwarf Spheroidal Galaxy or Pegasus II, a member of the Local Group of galaxies, a satellite of the Andromeda Galaxy
- Pegasus Galaxy (Stargate), a location in the science-fiction TV series Stargate Atlantis
