= Canes Venatici Dwarf Galaxy =

Canes Venatici Dwarf Galaxy may refer to one of two galaxies:

- Canes Venatici I
- Canes Venatici II
