= UGC 4879 =

Dwarf Galaxy at the periphery of the Local Group

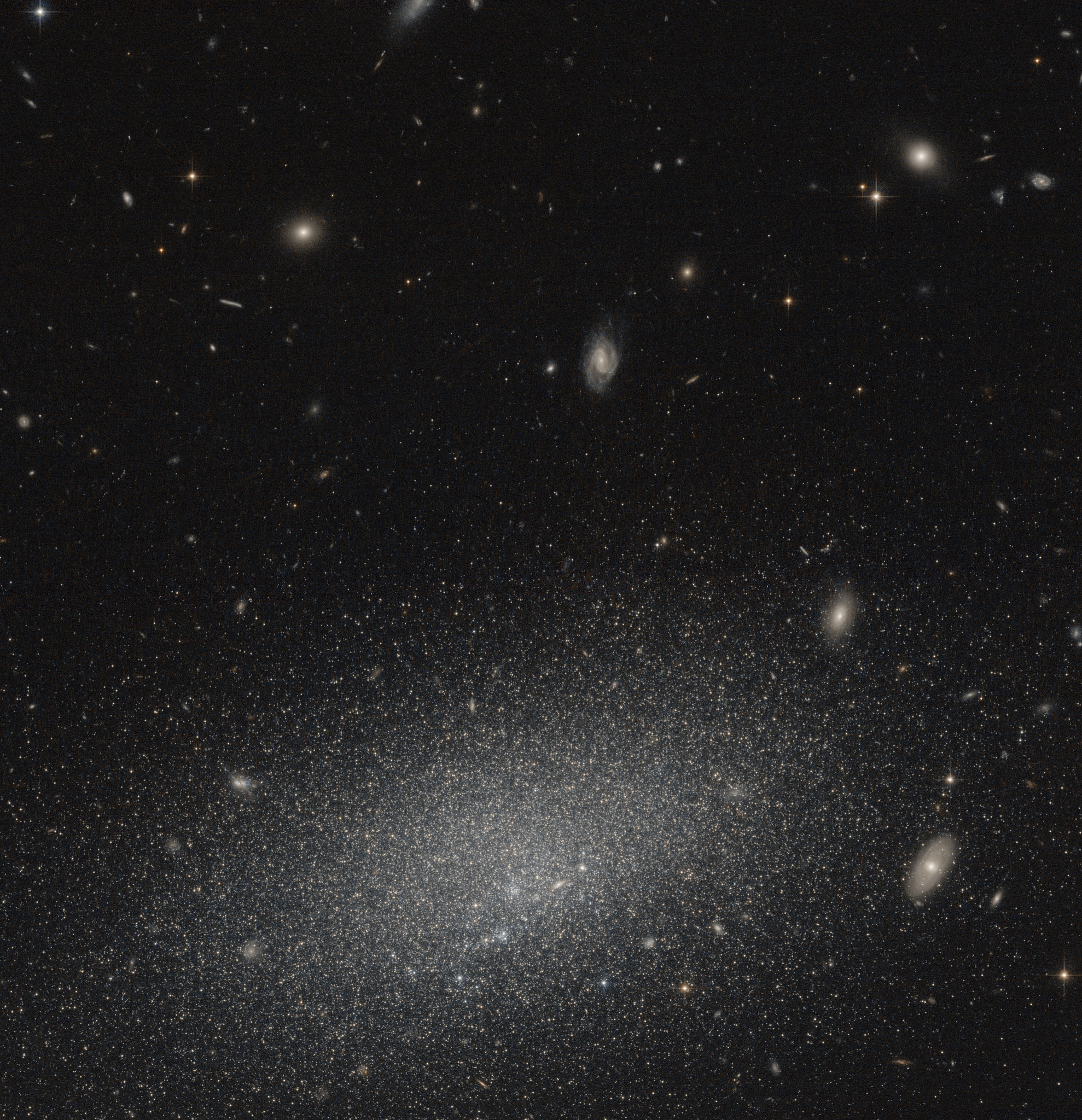
- UGC 4879, taken using the Hubble Space Telescope's Advanced Camera for Surveys

Observation data (J2000 epoch)
- Constellation: Ursa Major
- Right ascension: 09^{h} 16^{m} 02.023^{s}
- Declination: +52° 50′ 42.05″
- Redshift: −0.000233
- Heliocentric radial velocity: −70
- Distance: 4.18 ± 0.41 Mly (1.283 ± 0.126 Mpc)
- Group or cluster: Local Group
- Apparent magnitude (V): 13.2
- Apparent magnitude (B): 14.0

Characteristics
- Type: IAm
- Size: 3,000 ly (930 pc)
- Apparent size (V): 2.5′ × 1.5′
- Notable features: Isolated dwarf galaxy in the Local Group

Other designations
- VV 124, MGC+09-15-113, PGC 26142

UGC 4879, which is also known as VV 124, is the most isolated dwarf galaxy in the periphery of the Local Group. It is an irregular galaxy at a distance of 1.38 Mpc. Low-resolution spectroscopy yielded inconsistent radial velocities for different components of the galaxy, hinting at the presence of a stellar disk. There is also evidence of this galaxy containing dark matter.

== Appearance ==
UGC 4879 is a transition type galaxy, meaning it has no rings (Denoted rs). It is also a spheroidal (dSph) galaxy, meaning it has a low luminosity. It has little to no gas or dust, and little recent star formation. It is also irregular, meaning it has no specific form.

== Gallery ==
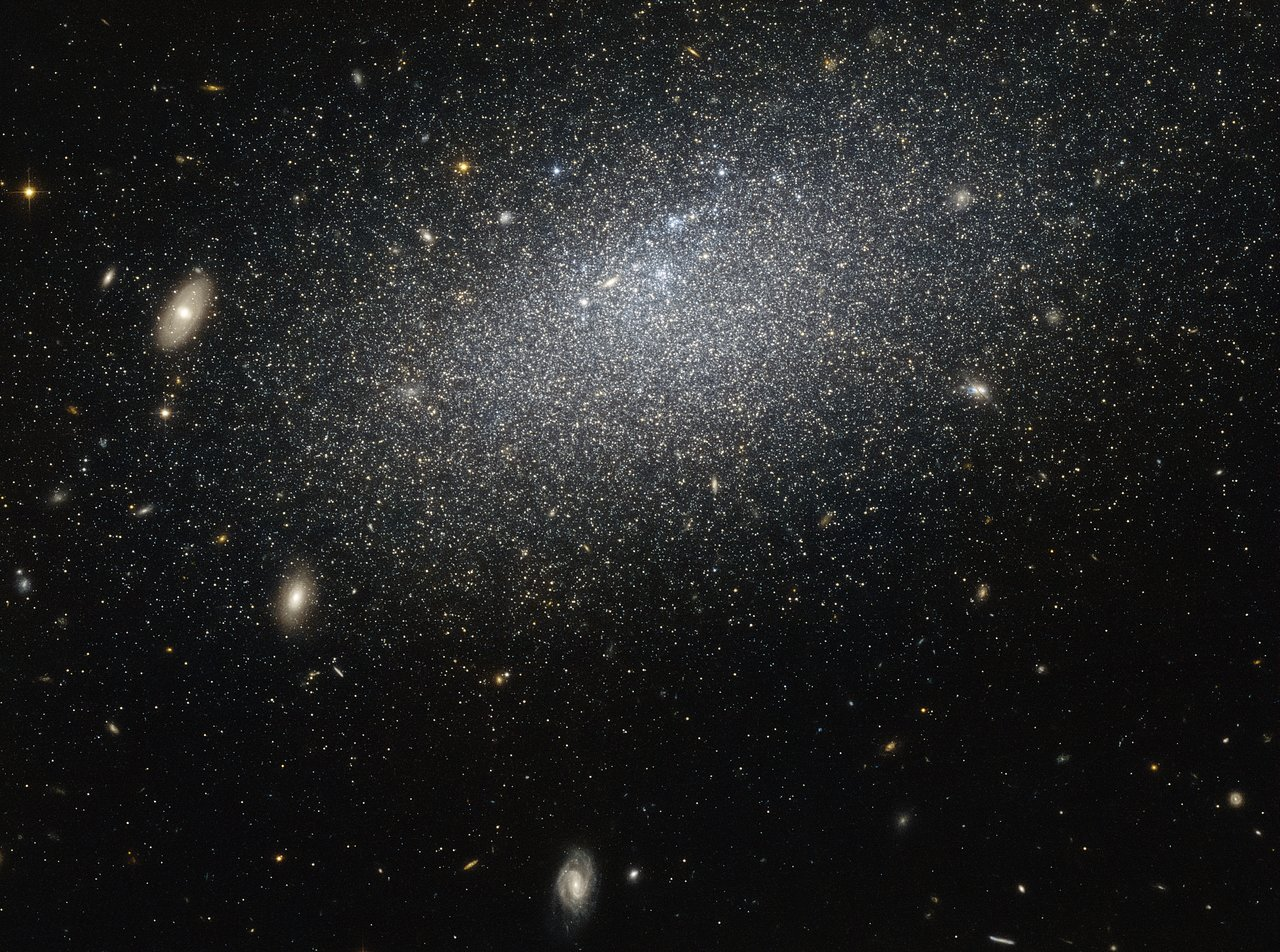
There are about 2.3 million light years between UGC 4879 and its closest neighbour, Leo A.

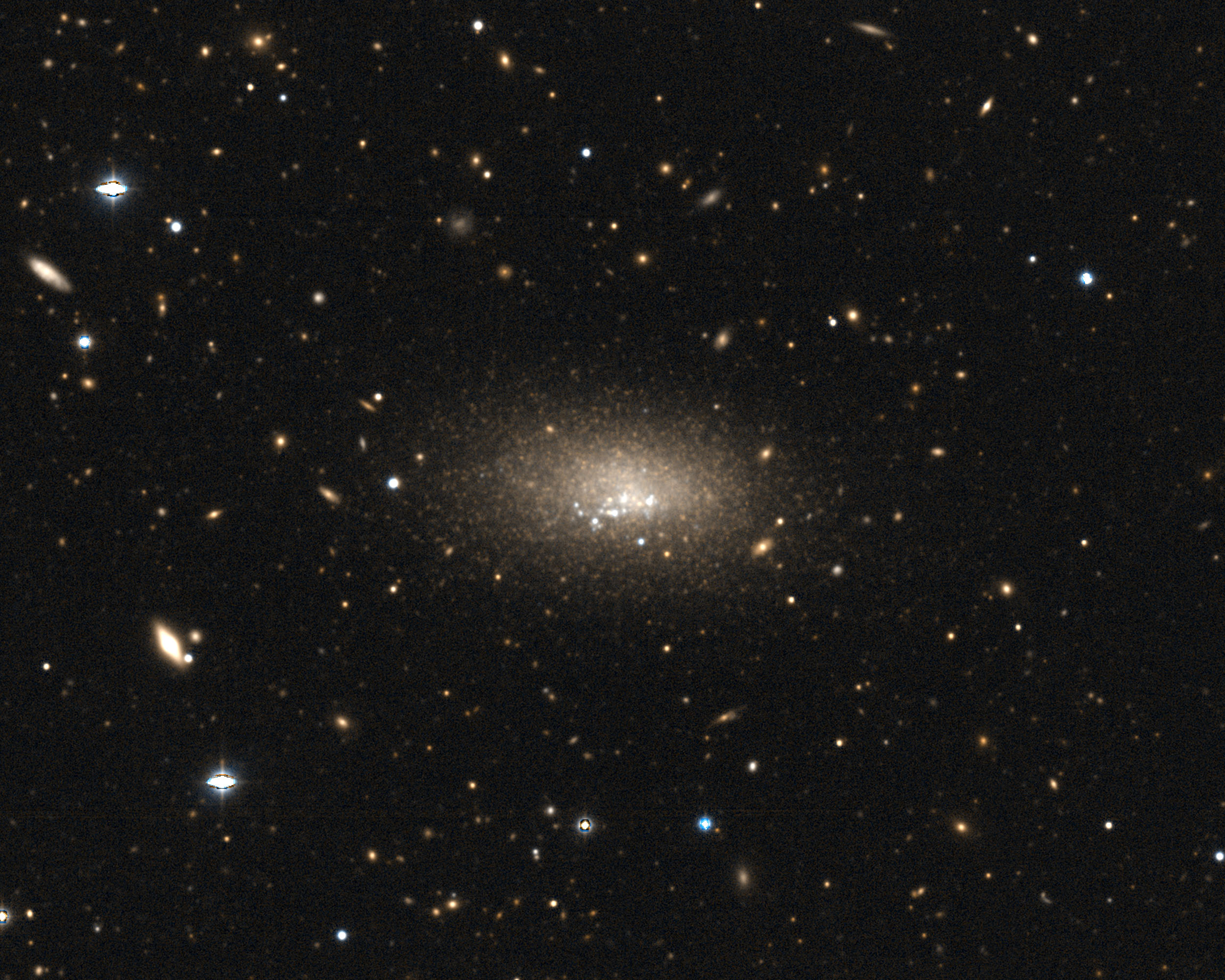
Ground-based observation of UGC 4879 with the legacy surveys
