= Tucana Dwarf =

Dwarf galaxy in the constellation Tucana

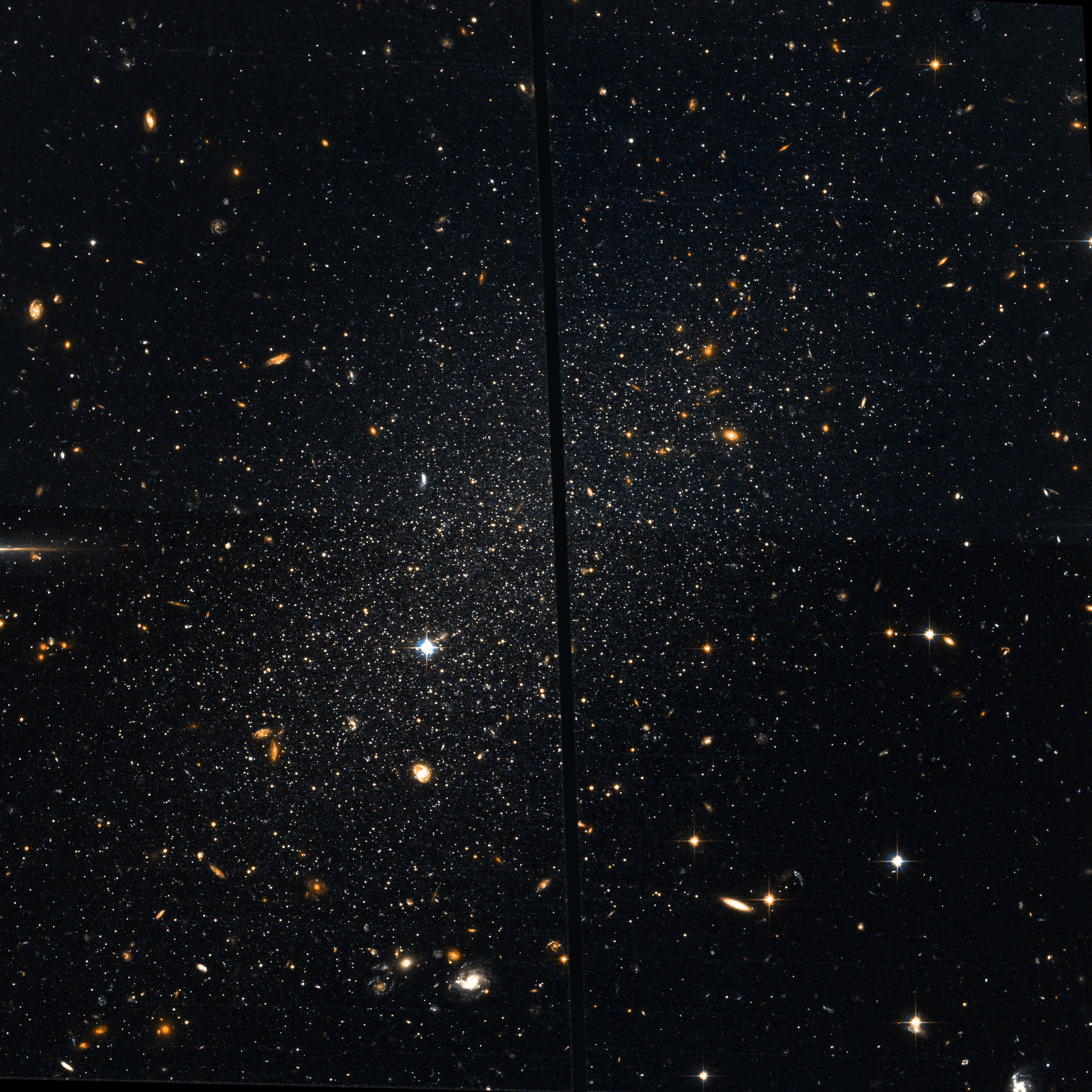
- Tucana Dwarf by HST

Observation data (J2000 epoch)
- Constellation: Tucana
- Right ascension: 22^{h} 41^{m} 49.0^{s}
- Declination: −64° 25′ 12″
- Redshift: 130 ± ? km/s
- Distance: 3.2 Mly
- Apparent magnitude (V): 15.7

Characteristics
- Type: dE4
- Apparent size (V): 2.9′ × 1.2′

Other designations
- PGC 69519

The Tucana Dwarf galaxy is a dwarf galaxy in the constellation Tucana. It was discovered in 1990 by R.J. Lavery of Mount Stromlo Observatory. It is composed of very old stars and is very isolated from other galaxies. Its location on the opposite side of the Milky Way from other Local Group galaxies makes it an important object for study.

== Properties ==
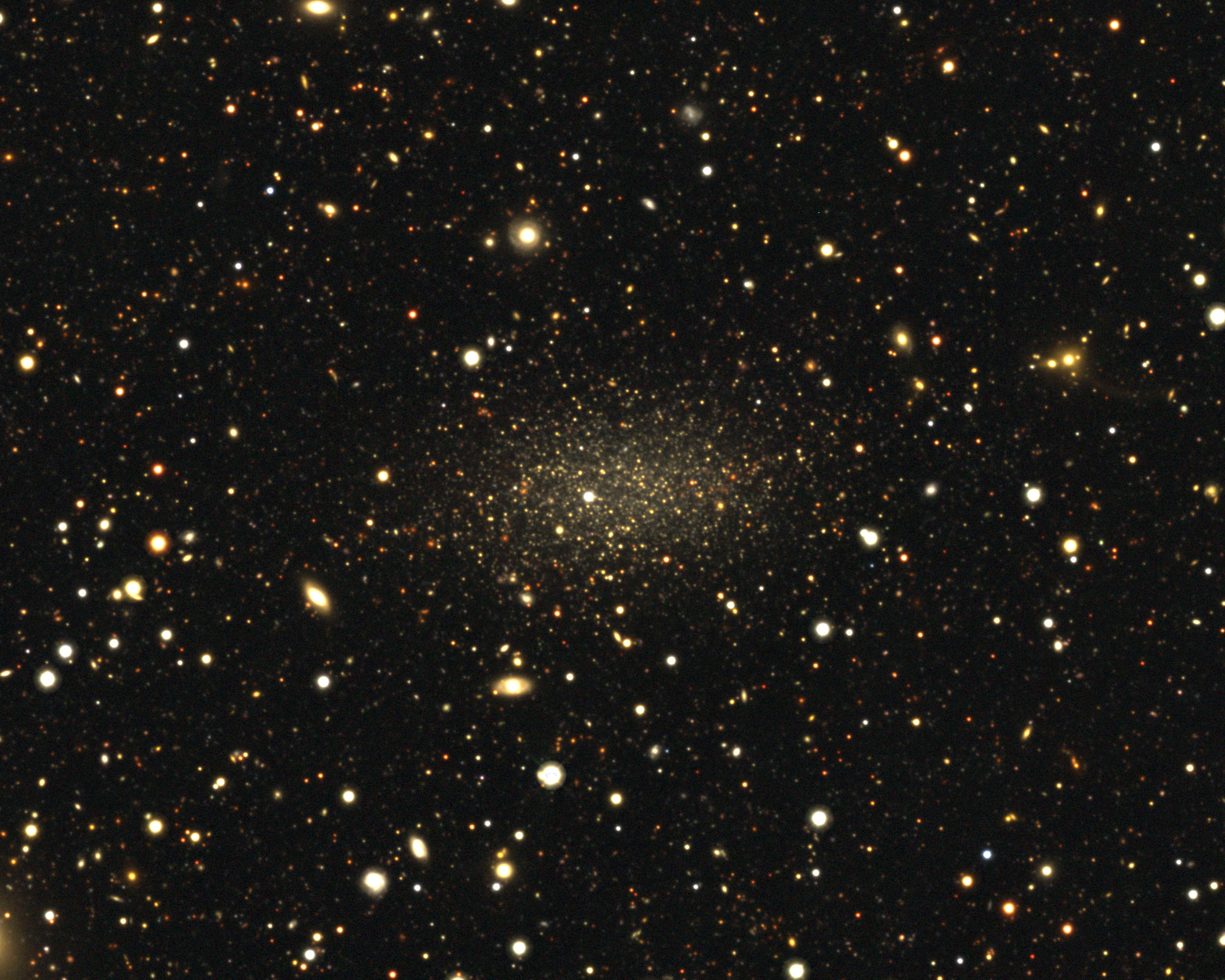
Ground-based image of the Tucana Dwarf with the legacy surveys

The Tucana Dwarf is a dwarf spheroidal galaxy of type dE5. It contains only old stars, formed in a single star formation era around the time the Milky Way's globular clusters formed. It is not experiencing any current star formation, unlike other isolated dwarf galaxies.

The Tucana Dwarf does not contain very much neutral hydrogen gas. It has a metallicity of -1.8, a significantly low number. There is no significant spread in metallicity throughout the galaxy. There does not seem to be any substructure to the stellar distribution in the galaxy.

== Location ==
The Tucana Dwarf is located in the constellation Tucana. It is about 870 kiloparsecs (2,800 kly) away, on the side of the Milky Way galaxy opposite to most of the other Local Group galaxies and is therefore important for understanding the kinematics and formation history of the Local Group, as well as the role of environment in determining how dwarf galaxies evolve. It is isolated from other galaxies, and located near the edge of the Local Group, around 1,100 kiloparsecs (3,600 kly) from the barycentre of the Local Group—the second most remote of all member galaxies after the Sagittarius Dwarf Irregular Galaxy.

The Tucana Dwarf galaxy is one of only two dwarf spheroidal galaxies in the Local Group not located near the Milky Way or the Andromeda Galaxy. It is thought to have approached the Andromeda Galaxy about 11 billion years ago, which ejected the galaxy far away to its current position; such galaxies are called "backsplash galaxies".
