= Cassiopeia Dwarf =

Galaxy in the constellation Cassiopeia

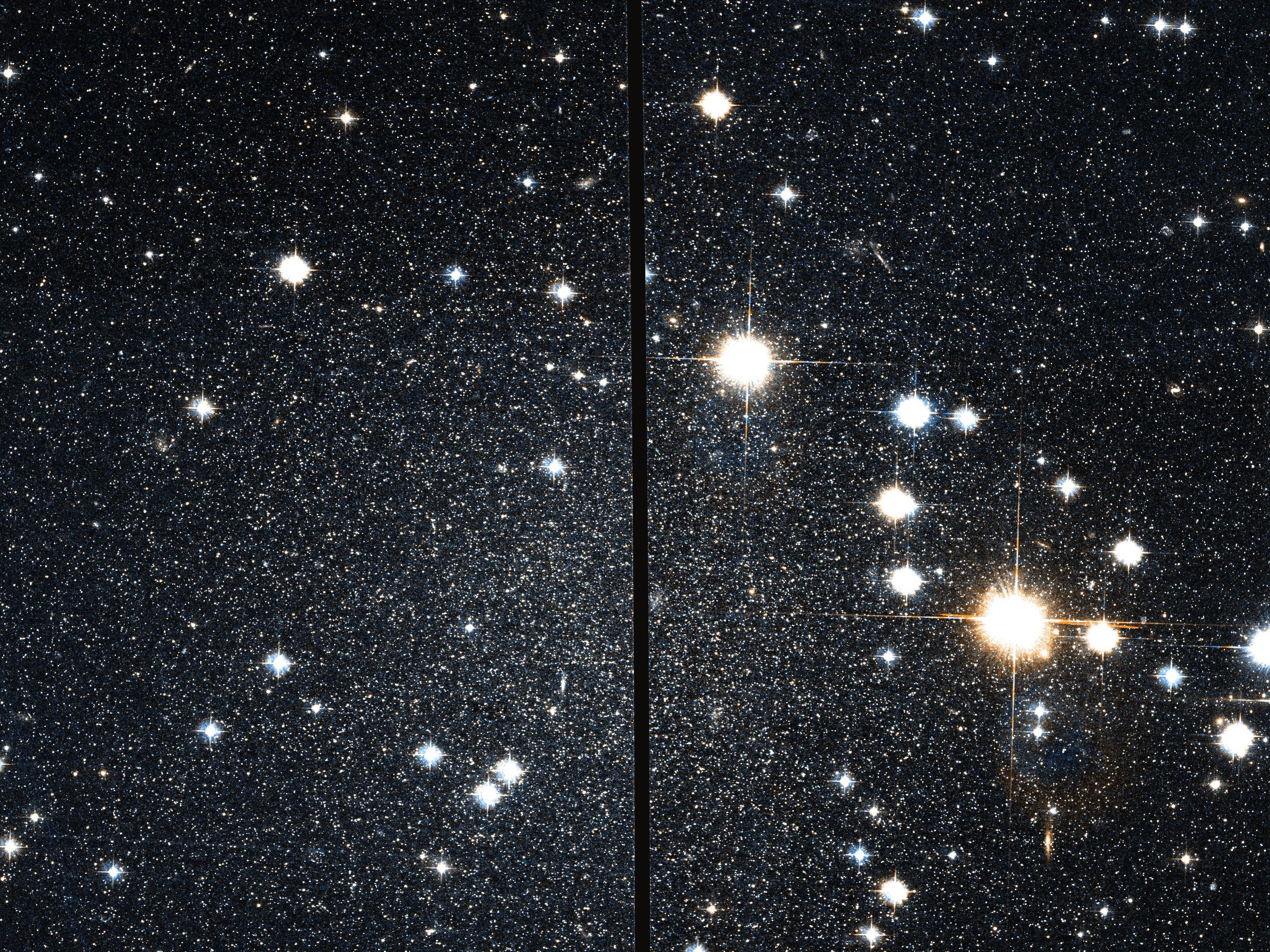
- Cassiopeia Dwarf by HST/WikiSky

Observation data (J2000 epoch)
- Constellation: Cassiopeia
- Right ascension: 23^{h} 26^{m} 31.0^{s}
- Declination: +50° 41′ 31″
- Redshift: −307 ± 2 km/s
- Distance: 2.45 Mly (0.75 Mpc)
- Apparent magnitude (V): 12.9
- Absolute magnitude (V): −13.3 ± 0.3

Characteristics
- Type: dSph
- Apparent size (V): 2.5′ × 2.0′
- Notable features: satellite galaxy of the Andromeda Galaxy

Other designations
- Andromeda VII, And VII, Cas dSph, PGC 2807155, Cassiopeia Dwarf Galaxy

The Cassiopeia Dwarf (also known as Andromeda VII) is a dwarf spheroidal galaxy about 2.45 Mly away in the constellation Cassiopeia. The Cassiopeia Dwarf is part of the Local Group and a satellite galaxy of the Andromeda Galaxy (M31). In the sky, it appears behind the Milky Way's galactic plane, and so it is reddened by 0.194 magnitudes. With a luminosity of 1.8×10^{7} L_{☉} and a stellar mass of 19.73×10^{6} M_{☉}, it is the brightest and most massive of the Andromeda Galaxy's dwarf spheroidal galaxy satellites. It also has the highest metallicity out of all of them.

The Cassiopeia Dwarf was found in 1998, together with the Pegasus Dwarf, by a team of astronomers (Karachentsev and Karachentseva) in Russia and Ukraine. The Cassiopeia Dwarf and the Pegasus Dwarf are farther from M31 than its other known companion galaxies, yet still appear bound to it by gravity. Neither galaxy contains any young, massive stars or shows traces of recent star formation. Instead, both seem dominated by very old stars, with ages of up to 10 billion years. The main period of star formation occurred around 6.2 billion years ago, and 90% of the star formation in the Cassiopeia Dwarf was done by 5 billion years ago.

== See also ==
- Andromeda's satellite galaxies
