= Andromeda V =

Dwarf spheroidal galaxy in the constellation Andromeda

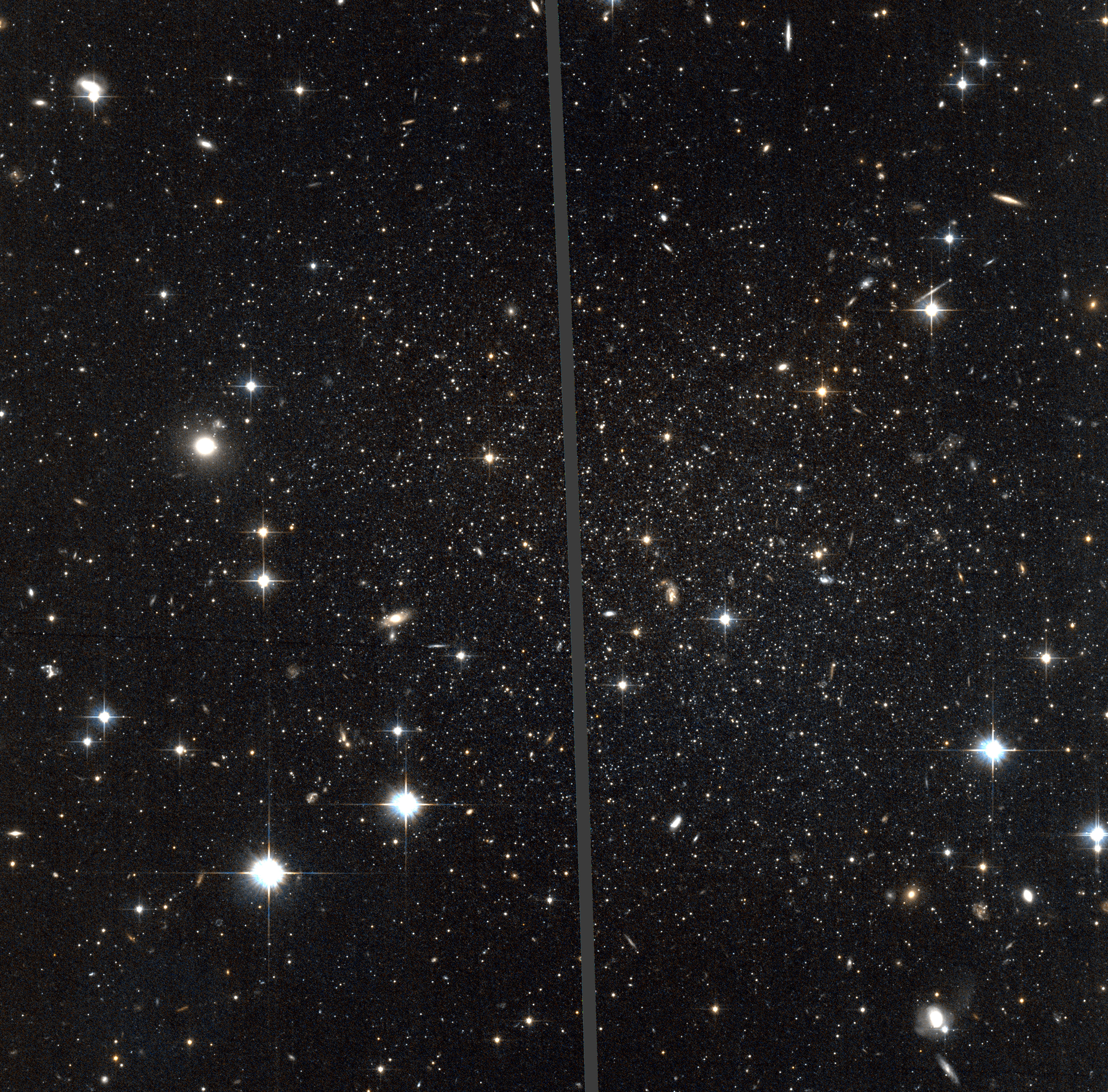
- Andromeda V with Hubble

Observation data (J2000 epoch)
- Constellation: Andromeda
- Right ascension: 01^{h} 10^{m} 17.1^{s}
- Declination: +47° 37′ 41″
- Redshift: -403 ± 4 km/s
- Distance: 2.52 ± 0.09 Mly (773 ± 28 kpc)
- Apparent magnitude (V): 15.9

Characteristics
- Type: dSph
- Apparent size (V): 2.0′ × 1.5′
- Notable features: satellite galaxy of M31

Other designations
- And V, PGC 3097824, LEDA 3097824

Andromeda V is a dwarf spheroidal galaxy about 2.52 Mly away in the constellation Andromeda.

Andromeda V was discovered by Armandroff et al. and published in 1998 after their analysis of the digitized version of the second Palomar Sky Survey.

The metallicity of Andromeda V is above the average metallicity to luminosity ratio of the Local Group's dwarf galaxies.

== See also ==
- List of Andromeda's satellite galaxies
