= Leo T =

Dwarf spheroidal Galaxy in the constellation Leo

Leo T Dwarf Galaxy
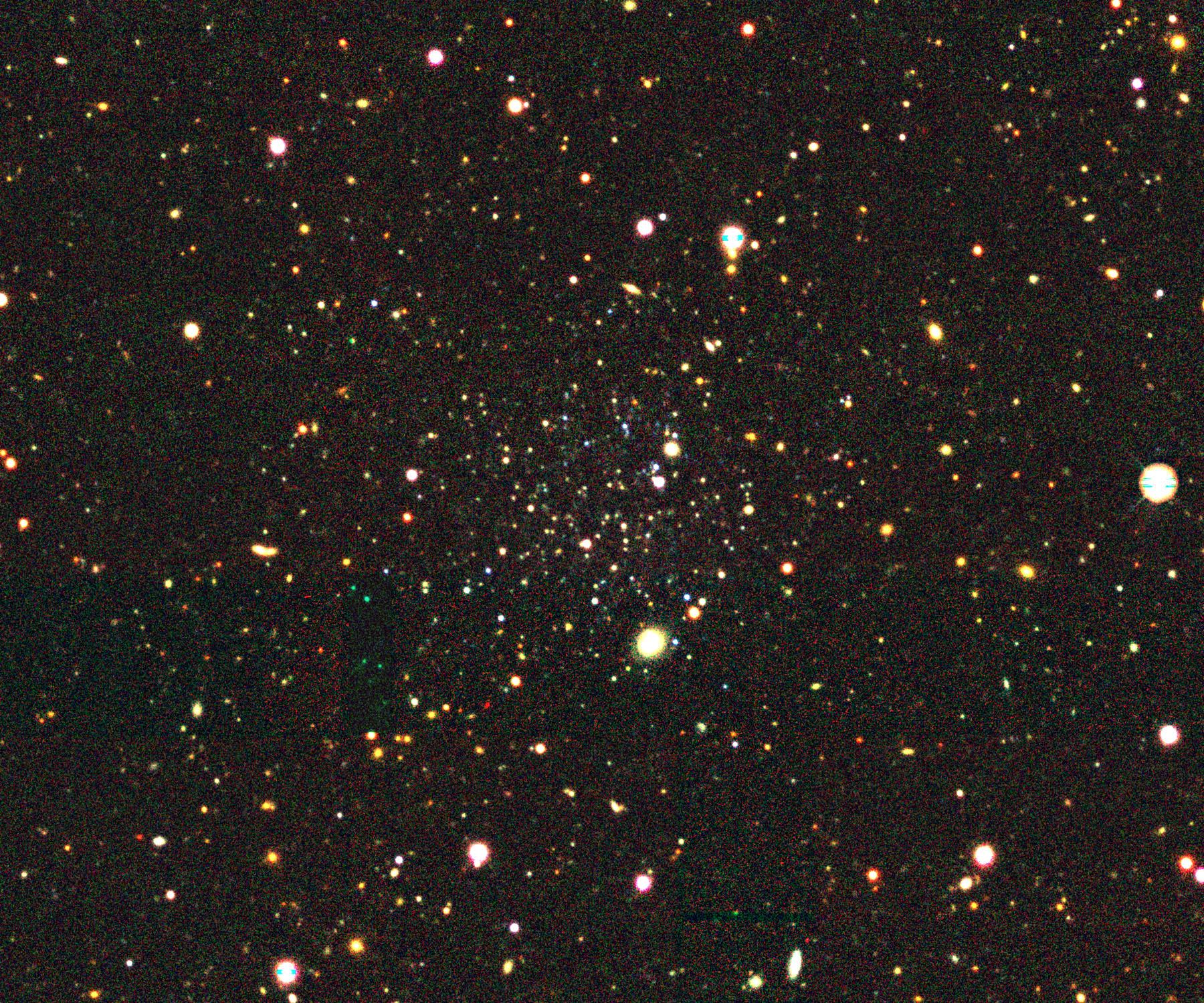
- Leo T with the legacy surveys

Observation data (J2000 epoch)
- Constellation: Leo
- Right ascension: 09^{h} 34^{m} 53.4^{s}
- Declination: +17° 03′ 05″
- Distance: 1,330 kly (409 kpc)
- Apparent magnitude (V): 16

Characteristics
- Type: dSph/dIrr
- Apparent size (V): 2.8′

Other designations
- Leo T, PGC 4713564

Leo T is a dwarf galaxy situated in the constellation Leo and discovered in 2006 in the data obtained by Sloan Digital Sky Survey. The galaxy is located at the distance of about 409 kpc and is moving away with a velocity of about 35 km/s. The velocity with respect to the Milky Way is around −60 km/s implying a slow infall onto the Milky Way. Leo T is classified as a transitional object ('T' in the name) between dwarf spheroidal galaxies (dSph) and dwarf irregular galaxies (dIrr). Its half-light radius is about 180 pc.

Leo T is one of the smallest and faintest galaxies in the Local Group—its integrated luminosity is about 40,000 times that of the Sun (absolute visible magnitude of about −7.1). (Note: From another source the absolute magnitude is about −8.0.) However, its mass is about 8 million solar masses, which means that Leo's mass to light ratio is around 140. A high mass to light ratio implies that Leo T is dominated by dark matter.

== Neutral hydrogen and star formation ==
The stellar population of Leo T consists of both old and young stars. The old stars probably formed from 12 to 6 billion years ago. The metallicity of these old stars is very low at [Fe/H] ≈ −2.02 ± 0.54, (Note: Other sources report metallicity of about −1.5.) which means that they contain 100 times less heavy elements than the Sun. The observed old stars are primarily red giants, although a number of horizontal branch stars and red clump stars were also discovered. After a pause star formation activity resumed about 1 billion years ago resulting in a generation of blue young stars. These young stars, which comprise only about 10% of all stellar mass, appear to be more concentrated at the center of Leo T than the old population. Currently there is no star formation in this galaxy.

Leo T contains significant amount of neutral hydrogen (HI) gas with the mass of about 280,000 solar masses, which is three times more than the mass of the stars in this galaxy. As of 2023, it is the least massive galaxy known to contain neutral gas. The gas includes two main components: cool gas in the center of the galaxy with a temperature of about 500 K and warm gas distributed throughout Leo T with a temperature of 6,000 K. The density of this gas is, however, not enough on average for star formation, which indicates that local processes have a role. Still the presence of hydrogen gas implies that in the future the galaxy will begin forming stars again.

Leo T galaxy may have formed when a small dark matter halo started accretion of gas some time after the reionization epoch. Later this gas gave birth to the first generation of old stars.
