= Cetus Dwarf =

Galaxy in the constellation Cetus

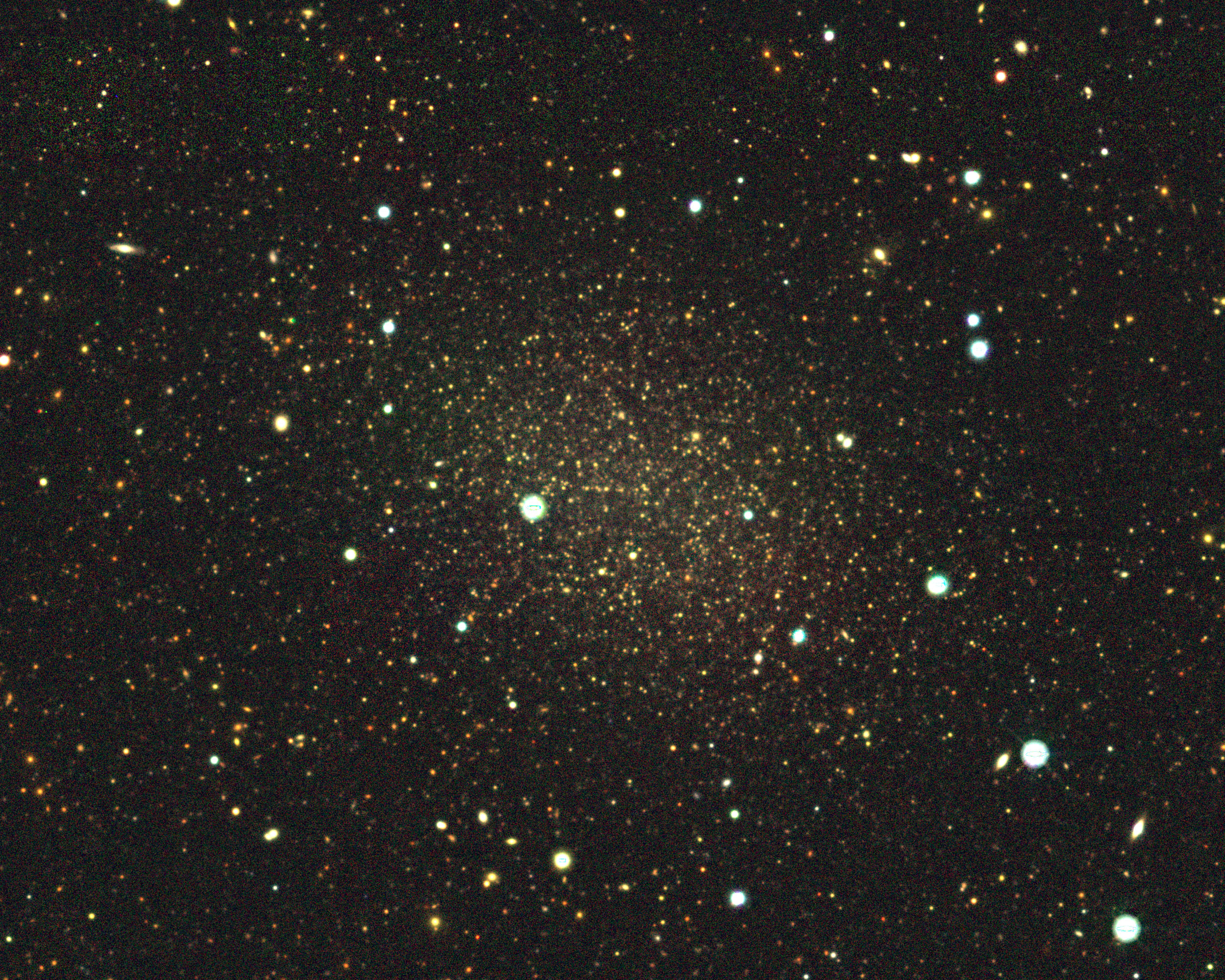
- Cetus Dwarf with legacy surveys

Observation data (J2000 epoch)
- Constellation: Cetus
- Right ascension: 00^{h} 26^{m} 11.0^{s}
- Declination: −11° 02′ 40″
- Distance: 2.46 ± 0.08 Mly (755 ± 24 kpc)
- Apparent magnitude (V): 14.4

Characteristics
- Type: dSph
- Apparent size (V): 5.0′ × 4.3′

Other designations
- PGC 3097691

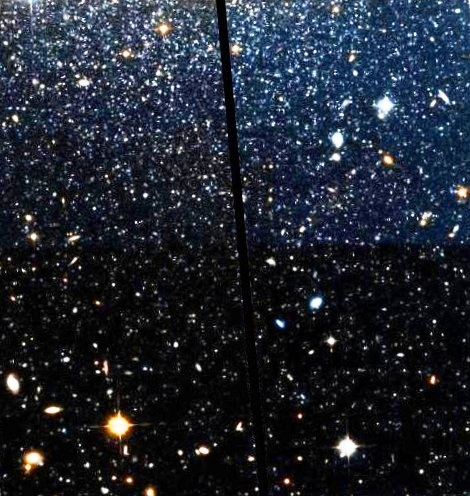
Part of the Cetus Dwarf with Hubble.

Cetus Dwarf is a dwarf spheroidal galaxy. It lies approximately 2.46 Million light-years from Earth. It is an isolated galaxy of the Local Group, which also contains the Milky Way. All of the most readily observable stars in the galaxy are red giants.

== History ==
The Cetus Dwarf was discovered in 1999 by Alan B. Whiting, George Hau and Mike Irwin and was found to be a member of the Local Group.

== Characteristics ==
As of 2000, no known neutral hydrogen gas has been found that is related to the Cetus dwarf galaxy.
