= Carina III =

Satellite galaxy

Observation data
- Constellation: Carina
- Right ascension: 10:17:00
- Declination: -61:20:00
- Distance: 91,300 ly (28 kpc)

Characteristics
- Type: Dwarf galaxy

Carina III (Car III) is an ultra-faint satellite galaxy of the Milky Way located roughly 91,300 light years (28 kpc) away in the constellation of Carina. It was discovered using data from the Magellanic Satellites Survey (MagLiteS).

It is a dwarf galaxy with a very elongated and compact morphology. It is also a dark matter dominated galaxy. While it is metal-rich compared to most dwarf galaxies with similar luminosities, it is much more metal-poor compared to star clusters of similar luminosities.

== Galactic neighborhood ==
It is a member of the local group, being a satellite galaxy to the Milky Way. It is located close to another satellite galaxy, Carina II, with the smallest known physical separation among galaxies in the local group. However they are unlikely to be a bounded pair. Both galaxies, however, may be associated with the Large Magellanic Cloud (LMC) and possibly satellite to it.
