= Sagittarius Dwarf Irregular Galaxy =

Dwarf galaxy in the constellation of Sagittarius

SagDIG
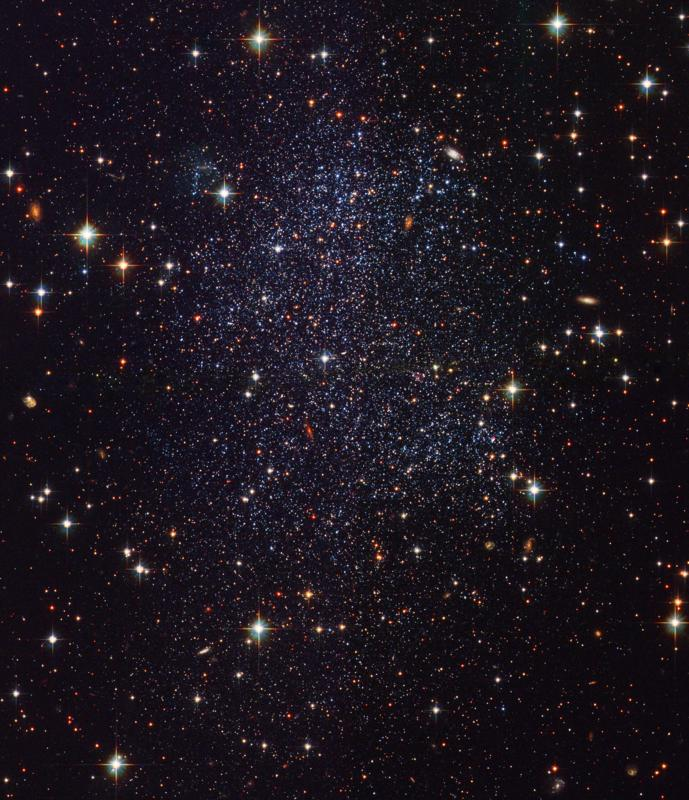
- SagDIG by Hubble Space Telescope

Observation data (J2000 epoch)
- Constellation: Sagittarius
- Right ascension: 19^{h} 29^{m} 59.0^{s}
- Declination: −17° 40′ 41″
- Redshift: −79±1 km/s
- Distance: 3.39±0.23 Mly (1.04±0.07 Mpc)
- Apparent magnitude (V): 15.5

Characteristics
- Type: IB(s)m V (Dwarf irregular galaxy)
- Apparent size (V): 2.9′ × 2.1′

Other designations
- Sagittarius Dwarf Irregular, SGR Dwarf, ESO 594-G004, PGC 63287, Kowal's Object

The Sagittarius Dwarf Irregular Galaxy (SagDIG) is a dwarf galaxy in the constellation of Sagittarius. It lies about 3.4 million light-years away. It was discovered on 13 June 1977 on a photographic plate taken for the ESO (B) Atlas on 13 June 1977 using the ESO 1 meter Schmidt telescope.

The SagDIG is thought to be the member of the Local Group most remote from the Local Group's barycenter. It is only slightly outside the zero-velocity surface of the Local Group.

SagDIG is a much more luminous galaxy than the Aquarius Dwarf and it has been through a prolonged period of star formation. This has resulted in it containing a rich intermediate-age population of stars. Twenty-seven candidate carbon stars have been identified inside SagDIG. Analysis shows that the underlying stellar population of SagDIG is metal-poor (at least [Fe/H] ≤ −1.3). Further, the population is young, with the most likely average age between 4 and 8 billion years for the dominant population.
