= Andromeda XIV =

Dwarf galaxy escaping the Local Group

Observation data
- Constellation: Andromeda
- Right ascension: 00h 41m 35.219s
- Declination: +29° 41′ 45.87″

Characteristics
- Type: dSph
- Notable features: Escaping the Local Group

Other designations
- And XIV

Andromeda XIV (And XIV) is a small satellite of the Andromeda Galaxy classed as a dwarf spheroidal galaxy.

It has an extreme speed of 481 kilometers per second placing this galaxy at the escape velocity of the Andromeda Galaxy. This would mean that this galaxy is not part of the Local Group of galaxies and is instead an isolated dwarf galaxy just passing through.
