= UKS 2323-326 =

Dwarf Galaxy located in the Sculptor Group

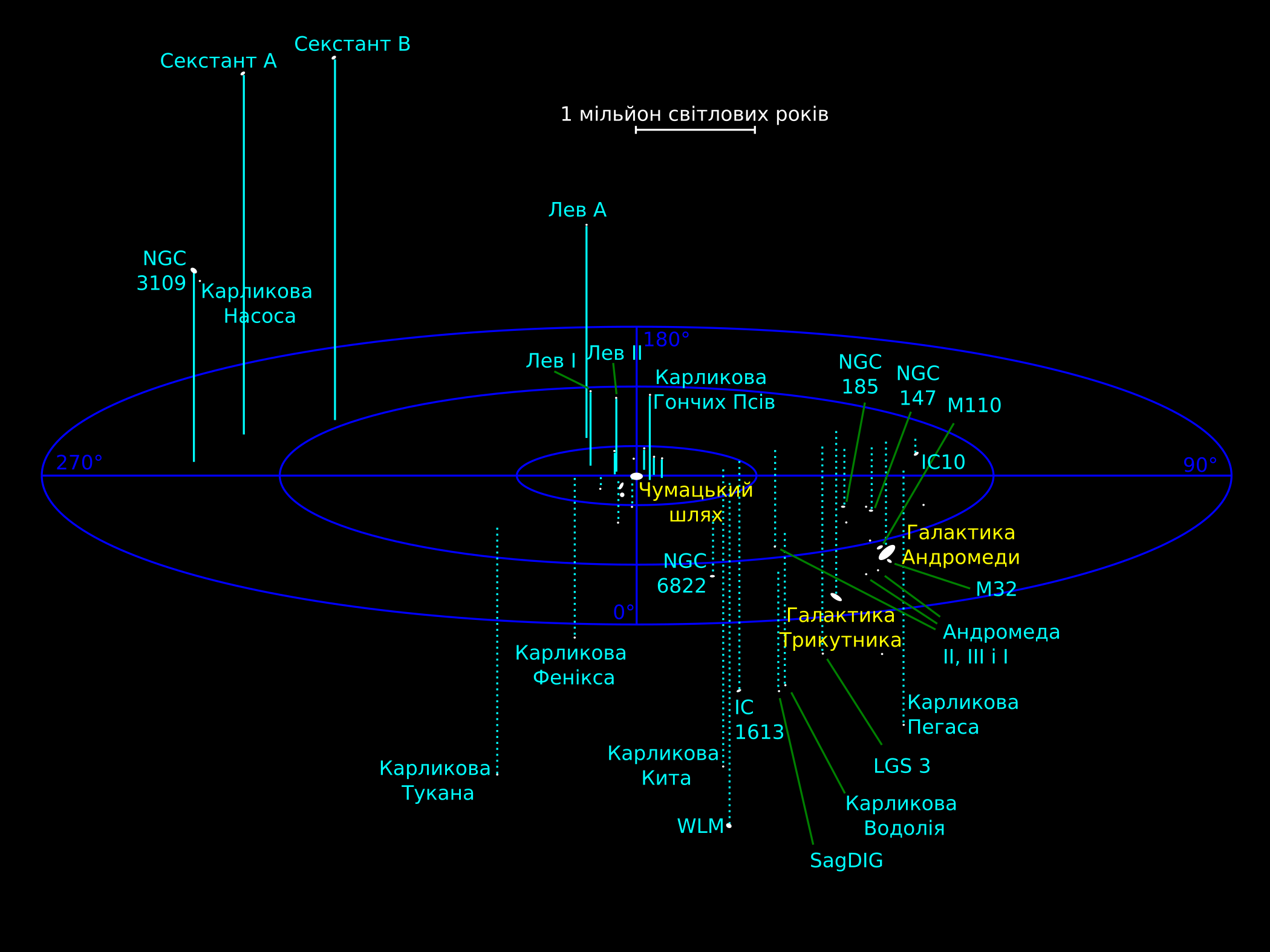
- UKS 2323-326 (not shown) is part of the Local Group, the Sculptor Group to be more specific.

Observation data
- Right ascension: 23^{h} 23^{m} 47.6^{s}
- Declination: −32° 39′ 57″
- Distance: 4.2 million ly

Characteristics
- Type: Dwarf irregular galaxy
- Number of stars: ~6x10^5

Other designations
- UGCA 4383, MCG -05-55-012, PGC 71431

UKS 2323-326 is a very low mass and faint dwarf irregular galaxy located in the Local Group at a distance of 1.3 mpc from Earth. The galaxy is a member of the Sculptor Group. The galaxy has a young stellar population that recently (~100 mya) formed defined red giant branch (RGB) stars but no significant amount of H ll emissions. It also has no detected hot dust or polycyclic aromatic hydrocarbons.

== Structure and composition ==
The galaxy shape is amorphous but surprisingly circular. The central region of UKS 2323-326 has a concentration of several tens of bright stars. Farther from the center of the galaxy are fewer bright stars and more faint stars. There are a number of red giant branch (AGB) stars that exist in UKS 2323-326 and a lack of H II regions.
