= Leo II (dwarf galaxy) =

Dwarf Spheroidal galaxy in the constellation Leo

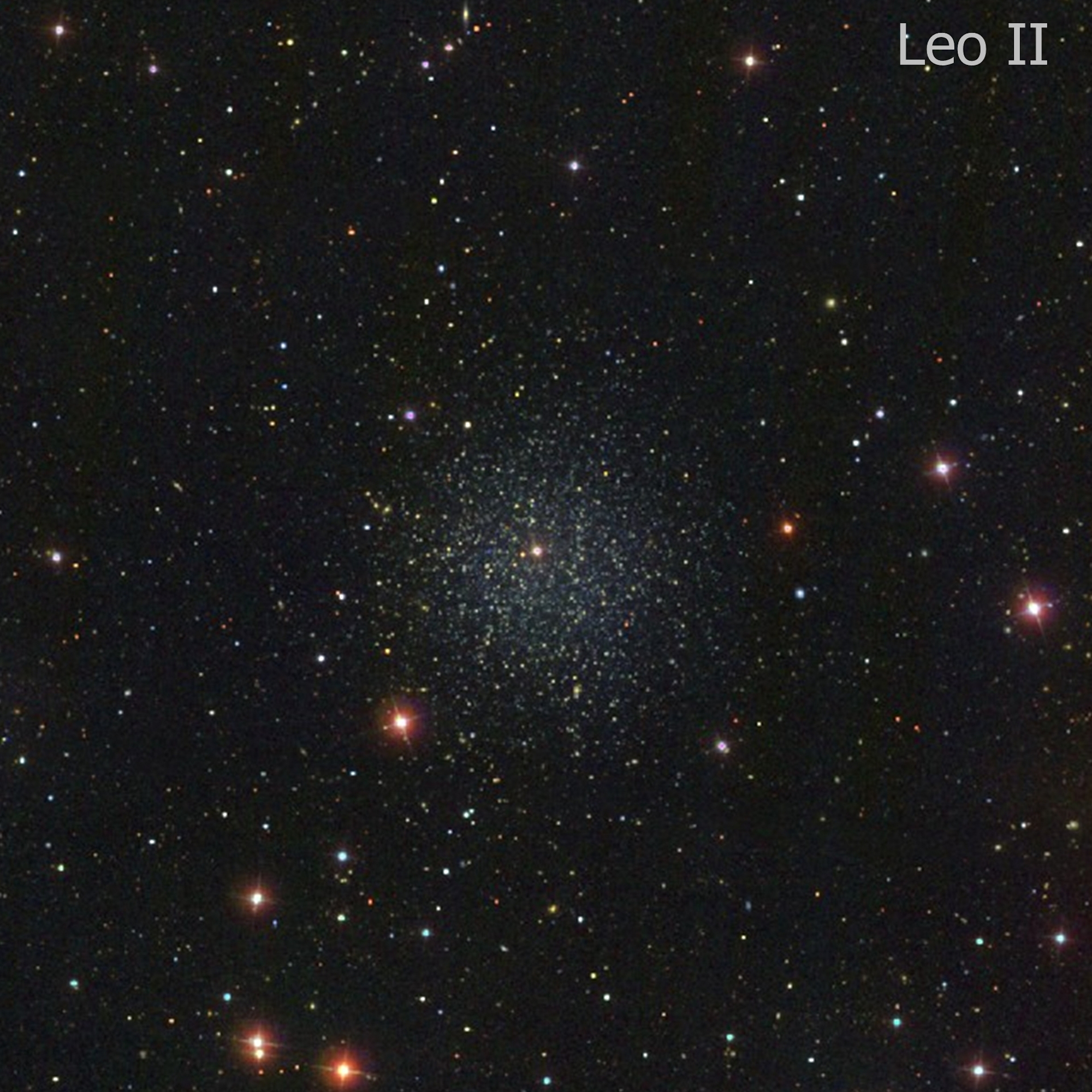

Observation data (J2000 epoch)
- Constellation: Leo
- Right ascension: 11^{h} 13^{m} 29.2^{s}
- Declination: +22° 09′ 17″
- Redshift: 0.000264 (79 ± 1 km/s)
- Distance: 690 ± 70 kly (210 ± 20 kpc)
- Apparent magnitude (V): 12.6

Characteristics
- Type: E0 pec
- Apparent size (V): 12.0 x 11.0 arcmin

Other designations
- PGC 34176, DDO 93

Leo II (or Leo B) is a dwarf spheroidal galaxy about 690,000 light-years away in the constellation Leo. It is one of 24 known satellite galaxies of the Milky Way. Leo II is thought to have a core radius of 178 ± 13 pc and a tidal radius of 632 ± 32 pc. It was discovered in 1950 by Robert George Harrington and Albert George Wilson, from the Mount Wilson and Palomar Observatories in California.

In 2007 a team of 15 scientists observed Leo II through the 8.2 meter Subaru optical-infrared telescope in Mauna Kea, Hawaii. Over 2 nights, 90 minutes of exposures were taken and 82,252 stars were detected down to a visible magnitude of 26. They found that Leo II consists largely of metal-poor older stars, a sign that it has survived the galactic cannibalism under which massive galaxies (e.g., the Milky Way) consume smaller galaxies to attain their extensive size.

Observation at ESO estimates Leo II's mass to be (2.7 ± 0.5)×10^{7} M_{☉}.

== See also ==
- Dwarf galaxy
- Local Group, a description of the group of galaxies that includes the Milky Way.
