= Canes Venatici I =

Galaxy in constellation Canes Venatici

Canes Venatici Dwarf Galaxy

Observation data (J2000 epoch)
- Constellation: Canes Venatici
- Right ascension: 13^{h} 28^{m} 03.5^{s}
- Declination: +33° 33′ 21″
- Distance: 711 ± 33 kly (218 ± 10 kpc); 685^{+23}_{−16} kly (210^{+7}_{−5} kpc)
- Apparent magnitude (V): 13.9 ± 0.5

Characteristics
- Type: dSph
- Apparent size (V): 17.8 ± 0.8′

Other designations
- CVn Dwarf Galaxy, PGC 4689223

Canes Venatici I or CVn I is a dwarf spheroidal galaxy situated in the constellation Canes Venatici and discovered in 2006 in the data obtained by Sloan Digital Sky Survey. It is one of the most distant known satellites of the Milky Way as of 2011 together with Leo I and Leo II. The galaxy is located at a distance of about 220 kpc from the Sun and is moving away from the Sun at a velocity of about 31 km/s. It is classified as a dwarf spheroidal galaxy (dSph) meaning that it has an elliptical (ratio of axes ~ 2.5:1) shape with the half-light radius of about 550 pc.

CVn I is a relatively faint satellite of the Milky Way—its integrated luminosity is about 230,000 times that of the Sun (absolute visible magnitude of about −8.6). However, its mass is about 27 million solar masses, which means that the galaxy's mass to light ratio is around 220. A high mass to light ratio implies that CVn I is predominantly made up of dark matter.

The stellar population of CVn I consists mainly of old stars formed more than 10 billion years ago. The metallicity of these old stars is also very low at [Fe/H] ≈ −2.08 ± 0.02, which means that they contain 110 times less heavy elements than the Sun. There are also about 60 RR Lyrae stars. The galaxy also contains a small fraction of younger (1–2 billion years old) more metal-rich ([Fe/H] ≈ −1.5) stars, which account for about 5% of its mass and 10% of its light. These younger stars are concentrated in the center of the galaxy. There is currently no star formation in CVn I and the measurements have so far failed to detect neutral hydrogen in it—the upper limit is 30,000 solar masses.
