= Andromeda VIII =

Galaxy in constellation Andromeda

Observation data (J2000 epoch)
- Constellation: Andromeda
- Right ascension: 00^{h} 42^{m} 06.0^{s}
- Declination: +40° 37′ 00″
- Distance: 2.7 Mly (0.83 Mpc)
- Apparent magnitude (V): 9.1
- Absolute magnitude (V): -15.6

Characteristics
- Type: dSph
- Apparent size (V): 45 × 10 arcmin
- Notable features: satellite galaxy of the Andromeda Galaxy

Other designations
- And VIII, PGC 5056928

Andromeda VIII (And VIII / 8) is a galaxy discovered in August 2003. It is a companion galaxy to the Andromeda Galaxy, M31, and evaded detection for so long due to its diffuse nature. The galaxy was finally discovered by measuring the redshifts of stars in front of Andromeda, which proved to have different velocities than M31 and hence were part of a different galaxy.

As of at least 2006, the actuality of And VIII as a galaxy has not yet been firmly established (Merrett et al. 2006).

== See also ==
- List of Andromeda's satellite galaxies
