= Andromeda XVIII =

Galaxy in constellation Andromeda

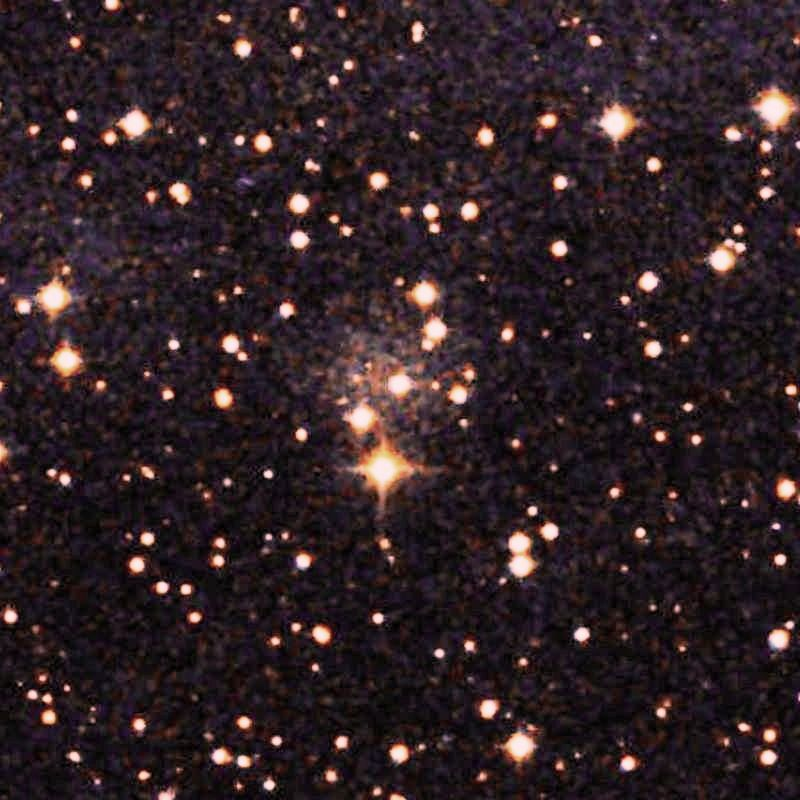
- DSS image of Andromeda XVIII

Observation data (J2000 epoch)
- Constellation: Andromeda
- Right ascension: 00^{h} 02^{m} 14.5^{s}
- Declination: +45° 05′ 20″
- Heliocentric radial velocity: −337.2 km/s
- Distance: 4,420 ± 290 kly (1,355 ± 88 kpc)
- Group or cluster: Local Group
- Apparent magnitude (V): 15.50 ± 0.24
- Absolute magnitude (V): −10.41 ± 0.28

Characteristics
- Type: dSph
- Mass: 4.2×10^{6} ± 0.3×10^{6} M_{☉}
- Half-light radius (physical): 325 ± 24

Other designations
- PGC 5056918

Andromeda XVIII, discovered in 2008, is a dwarf spheroidal galaxy (has no rings, low luminosity, much dark matter, little gas or dust), which is a satellite of the Andromeda Galaxy (M31). It is one of the 14 known dwarf galaxies orbiting M31. It is relatively isolated, being about 1.8 million light-years (579 kpc) away. However, for an isolated dwarf galaxy it is also unusually quiescent. This suggests that Andromeda XVIII is a backsplash galaxy, a galaxy that once had a close orbital encounter with a more massive galaxy which stripped it of much of its star-forming matter. However, alternative hypotheses are also possible for Andromeda XVIII.

It was announced in 2010 that the orbiting galaxies lie close to a plane running through M31's center.

== See also ==
- List of Andromeda's satellite galaxies
