= Leo A =

Irregular galaxy in the Local Group

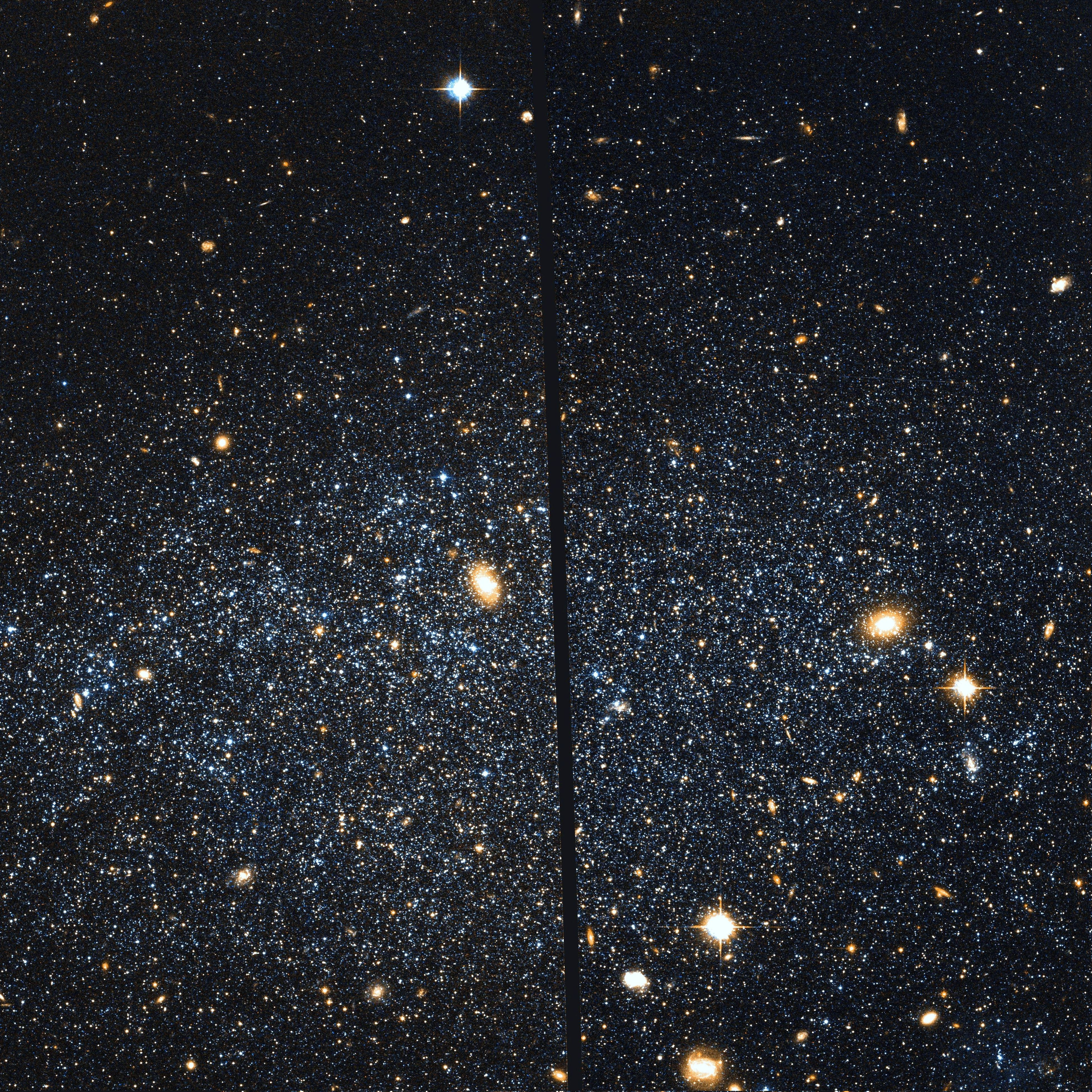
- Leo A by Hubble Space Telescope

Observation data (J2000 epoch)
- Constellation: Leo
- Right ascension: 09^{h} 59^{m} 26.4^{s}
- Declination: +30° 44′ 47″
- Redshift: 0.000067
- Distance: 2.6 ± 0.1 Mly (790 ± 40 kpc)
- Apparent magnitude (V): 12.9

Characteristics
- Type: IBm
- Apparent size (V): 5.1′ × 3.1′

Other designations
- Leo III, UGC 5364, DDO 69, PGC 28868

Leo A (also known as Leo III) is an irregular galaxy that is part of the Local Group. It lies 2.6 million light-years from Earth, and was discovered by Fritz Zwicky in 1942. The estimated mass of this galaxy is (8.0 ± 2.7) × 10^{7} solar masses, with at least 80% consisting of dark matter. It is one of the most isolated galaxies in the Local Group and shows no indications of an interaction or merger for several billion years. However, Leo A is nearly unique among irregular galaxies in that more than 90% of its stars formed more recently than 8 billion years ago, suggesting a rather unusual evolutionary history. The presence of RR Lyrae variables shows that the galaxy has an old stellar population that is up to 10 billion years in age.

The neutral hydrogen in this galaxy occupies in a volume similar to its optical extent, and is distributed in a squashed, uneven ring. The galaxy is not rotating and the hydrogen is moving about in random clumps. The proportion of elements with higher atomic numbers than helium is only about 1–2% of the ratio in the Sun. This indicates a much less complete conversion of gas into stars than in the Milky Way galaxy. The Leo A galaxy shows sign of increased star formation some time within the last 1–4 billion years, although the current level is low. There are four H II regions powered by short-lived, O-class stars.

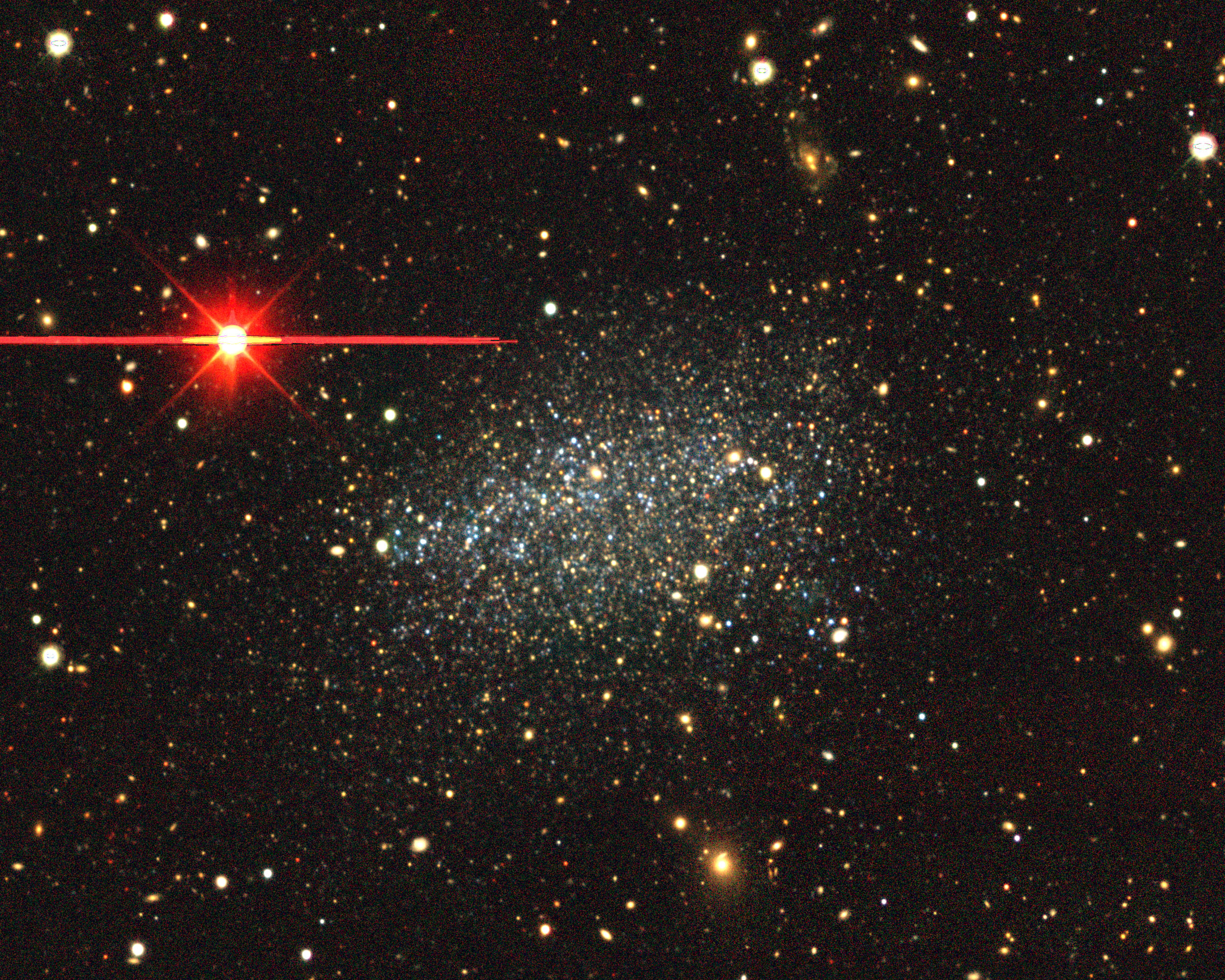
Complete image of Leo A with the legacy surveys
