= Pegasus Dwarf Irregular Galaxy =

Dwarf irregular galaxy in the constellation of Pegasus

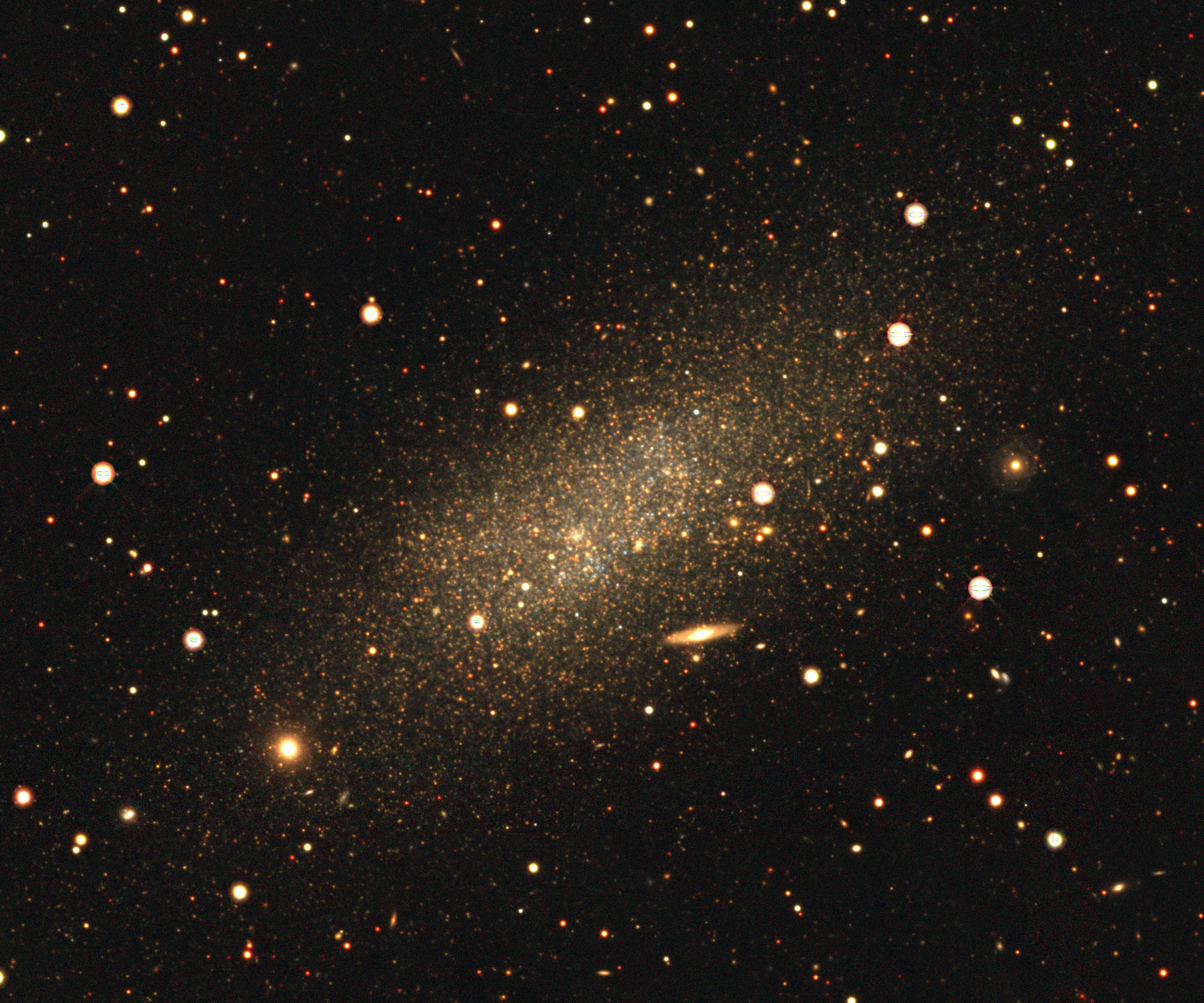
- Pegasus Dwarf Irregular Galaxy (Pegasus Dwarf) observation by the legacy surveys

Observation data (J2000 epoch)
- Constellation: Pegasus
- Right ascension: 23^{h} 28^{m} 36.2^{s}
- Declination: +14° 44′ 35″
- Redshift: −183 ± 0 km/s
- Distance: 3.0 ± 0.1 Mly (920 ± 30 kpc)
- Apparent magnitude (V): 13.2

Characteristics
- Type: dIrr/dSph^{[a]}
- Apparent size (V): 5.0′ × 2.7′

Other designations
- UGC 12613, PGC 71538, DDO 216, Pegasus Dwarf, PegDIG

The Pegasus Dwarf Irregular Galaxy (also known as Peg DIG or the Pegasus Dwarf) is a dwarf irregular galaxy in the direction of the constellation Pegasus. It was discovered by A. G. Wilson in the 1950s. The Pegasus Dwarf is a companion of the Andromeda Galaxy in the Local Group.

== General information ==
In 1975 Tully & Fisher determined that it was part of the Local Group. The metallicity and the related distance estimate has been subject to discussions in the scientific literature, with varying results; however, recently, by use of the tip of the red-giant branch, a distance within 10% error was achieved in 2000 and then improved to 3% in 2005.

== In popular culture ==
The science fiction television series Stargate Atlantis takes place in the "Pegasus galaxy" and has shown images of an irregular galaxy. However, the franchise has not explicitly stated if it is the Irregular, Spheroidal, or an entirely fictional location, but since the series claimed the Pegasus galaxy to be 3 million light years away, it is likely the irregular one.

== Gallery ==
Location of Pegasus Dwarf in the Local Group.

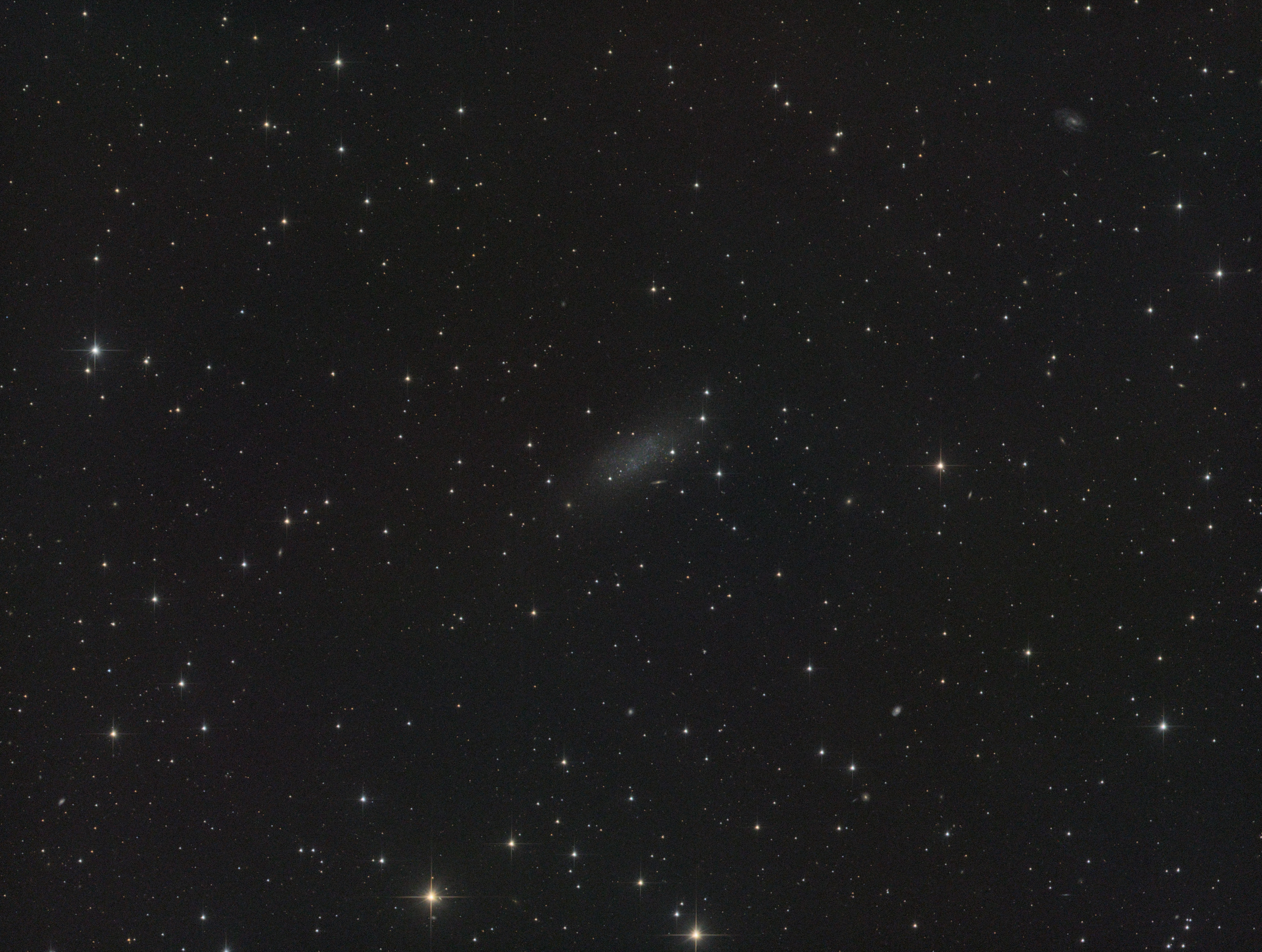
Pegasus Dwarf imaged by an amateur astronomer

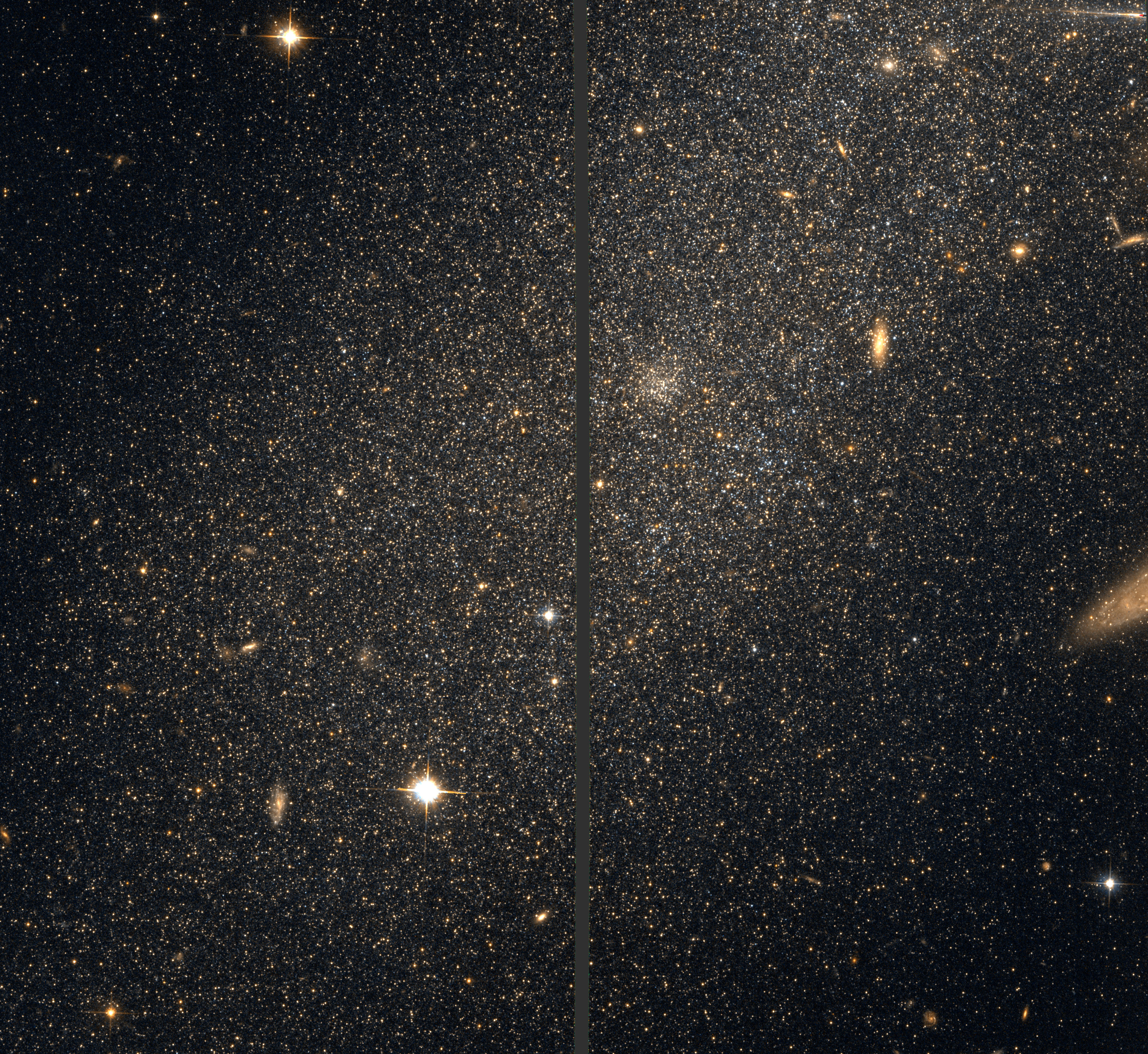
Part of the Pegasus Dwarf with Hubble

== See also ==
- Pegasus Dwarf Spheroidal Galaxy (Peg dSph)
- Pegasus galaxy, the Stargate Atlantis fictional location.

== Notes ==
1. NED gives the galaxy classification as both dIrr and dSph, which means that it is a transitory between dwarf irregular and dwarf spheroidal. It is noted as transitory in Cole et al. 1999.
