= Zero-velocity surface =

Surface a body of energy cannot cross

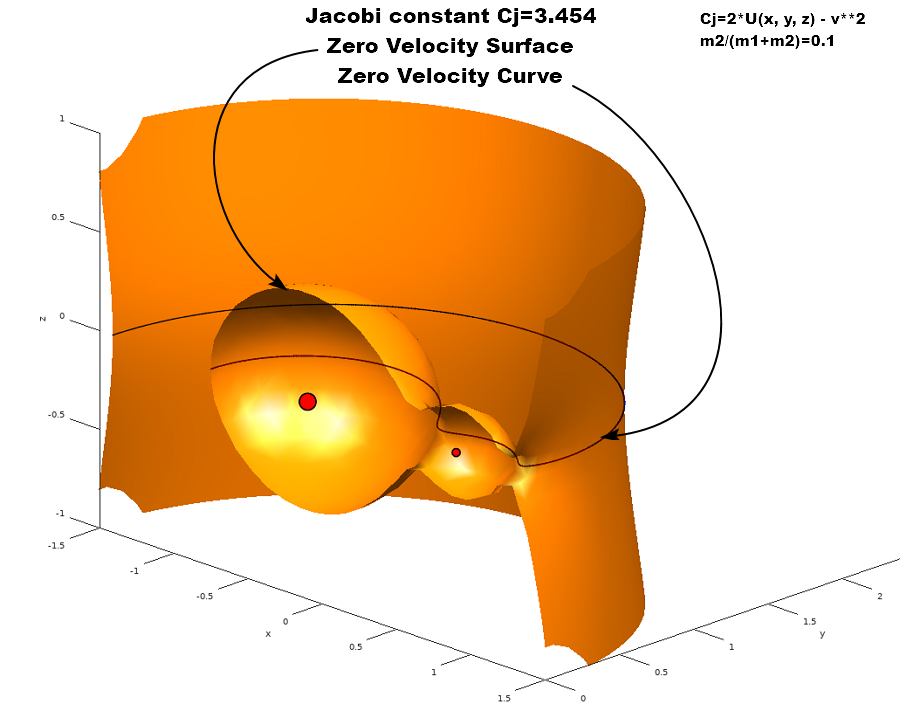
Jacobi constant, a Zero Velocity Surface and Curve (also Hill's curve)

A zero-velocity surface is a concept that relates to the N-body problem of gravity. It represents a surface a body of given energy cannot cross, since it would have zero velocity on the surface. It was first introduced by George William Hill. The zero-velocity surface is particularly significant when working with weak gravitational interactions among orbiting bodies.

== Three-body problem ==
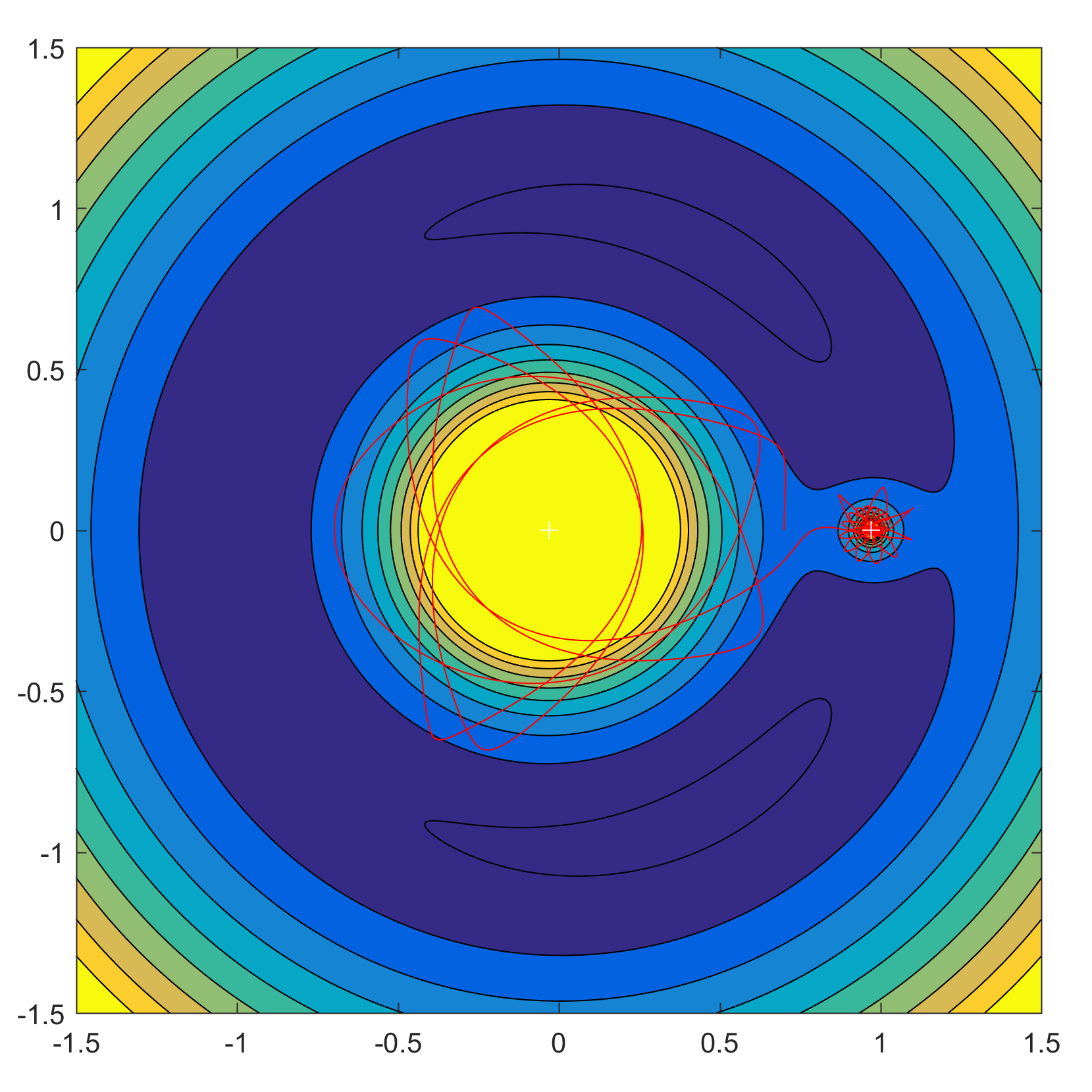
A trajectory (red) in the planar circular restricted 3-body problem that orbits the heavier body a number of times before escaping into an orbit around the lighter body. The contours denote values of the Jacobi integral. The dark blue region is supposed to be the excluded region for the trajectory, enclosed by a zero-velocity surface that cannot be crossed. However, this figure is incorrect because wherever the trajectory touches the zero-velocity surface it should be perpendicular to it.

In the circular restricted three-body problem two heavy masses orbit each other at constant radial distance and angular velocity, and a particle of negligible mass is affected by their gravity. By shifting to a rotating coordinate system where the masses are stationary a centrifugal force is introduced. Energy and momentum are not conserved separately in this coordinate system, but the Jacobi integral remains constant:

$$C=\omega^2 (x^2+y^2) + 2 \left(\frac{\mu_1}{r_1}+\frac{\mu_2}{r_2}\right) - \left(\dot x^2+\dot y^2+\dot z^2\right)$$

where $\omega$ is the rotation rate, $x,y$ the particle's location in the rotating coordinate system, $r_1,r_2$ the distances to the bodies, and $\mu_1,\mu_2$ their masses times the gravitational constant.

For a given value of $C$, points on the surface

$$C = \omega^2 (x^2+y^2) + 2 \left(\frac{\mu_1}{r_1}+\frac{\mu_2}{r_2}\right)$$

require that $\dot x^2+\dot y^2+\dot z^2=0$. That is, the particle will not be able to cross over this surface (since the squared velocity would have to become negative). This is the zero-velocity surface of the problem.

Note that this means zero velocity in the rotating frame: in a non-rotating frame the particle is seen as rotating with the other bodies. The surface also only predicts what regions cannot be entered, not the shape of the trajectory within the surface.

== Generalizations ==
The concept can be generalized to more complex problems, for example with masses in elliptic orbits, the general planar three-body problem, the four-body problem with solar wind drag, or in rings.

== Lagrange points ==
The zero-velocity surface is also an important parameter in finding Lagrange points. These points correspond to locations where the apparent potential in the rotating coordinate system is extremal. This corresponds to places where the zero-velocity surfaces pinch and develop holes as $C$ is changed. Since trajectories are confined by the surfaces, a trajectory that seeks to escape (or enter) a region with minimal energy will typically pass close to the Lagrange point, which is used in low-energy transfer trajectory planning.

== Galaxy clusters ==
Given a group of galaxies which are gravitationally interacting, the zero-velocity surface is used to determine which objects are gravitationally bound (i.e. not overcome by the Hubble expansion) and thus part of a galaxy cluster, such as the Local Group.

== See also ==
- Hill sphere
- Low-energy transfer
- Orbital mechanics
