= Andromeda XI =

Galaxy in constellation Andromeda

Observation data (J2000 epoch)
- Constellation: Andromeda
- Right ascension: 00^{h} 46.3^{m}
- Declination: +33° 48′ 05″
- Redshift: -0.001399 ± 0.000015
- Heliocentric radial velocity: (-419 ± 4.4) km/s
- Distance: 2.6 ± 325 Mly (830 kpc)
- Absolute magnitude (V): −7.3

Characteristics
- Type: dSph D
- Apparent size (V): 0.5 arcmin
- Notable features: satellite galaxy of the Andromeda Galaxy

Other designations
- And XI, PGC 5056923

Andromeda XI (And 11) is a dwarf spheroidal galaxy about 2.6 million light-years away from the Sun in the constellation Andromeda. Discovered in 2006, And XI is a satellite galaxy of the Andromeda Galaxy (M31).

== See also ==
- List of Andromeda's satellite galaxies
