= Pegasus Dwarf Spheroidal Galaxy =

Dwarf spheroidal galaxy in the constellation Pegasus

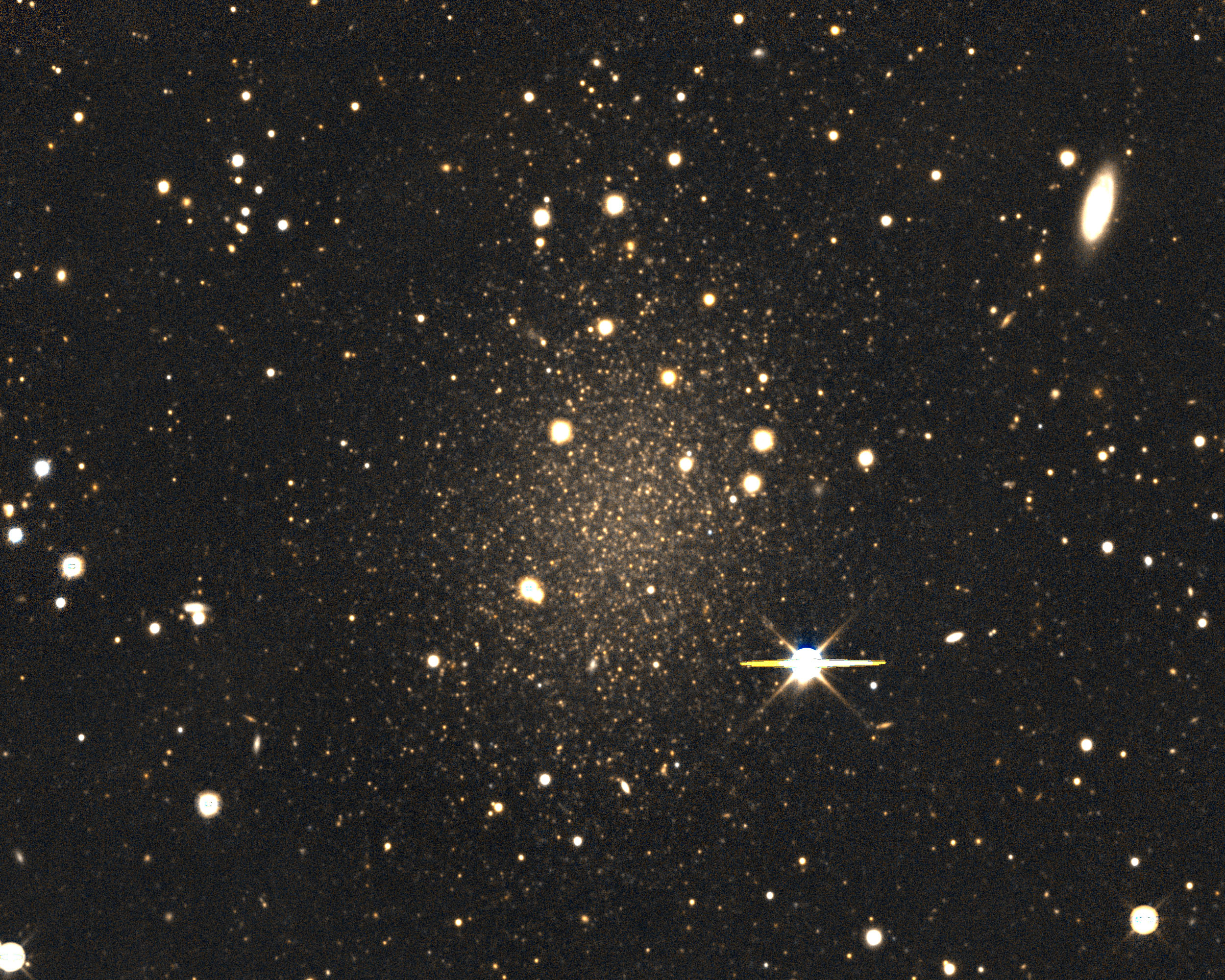
- Pegasus Dwarf Spheroidal Galaxy with the legacy surveys

Observation data (J2000 epoch)
- Constellation: Pegasus
- Right ascension: 23^{h} 51^{m} 46.3^{s}
- Declination: +24° 34′ 57″
- Heliocentric radial velocity: −341.6 ± 1.7 km/s
- Distance: 2.713 ± 0.075 Mly (831.8 ± 23 kpc)
- Apparent magnitude (V): 24.6
- Absolute magnitude (V): −11.6

Characteristics
- Type: dSph
- Apparent size (V): 4.0′ × 2.0′

Other designations
- Pegasus II, Andromeda VI, Peg dSph, KKH 99, PGC 2807158

The Pegasus Dwarf Spheroidal (also known as Andromeda VI or Peg dSph for short) is a dwarf spheroidal galaxy about 2.7 million light-years away in the constellation Pegasus. The Pegasus Dwarf is a member of the Local Group and a satellite galaxy of the Andromeda Galaxy (M31).

== General information ==
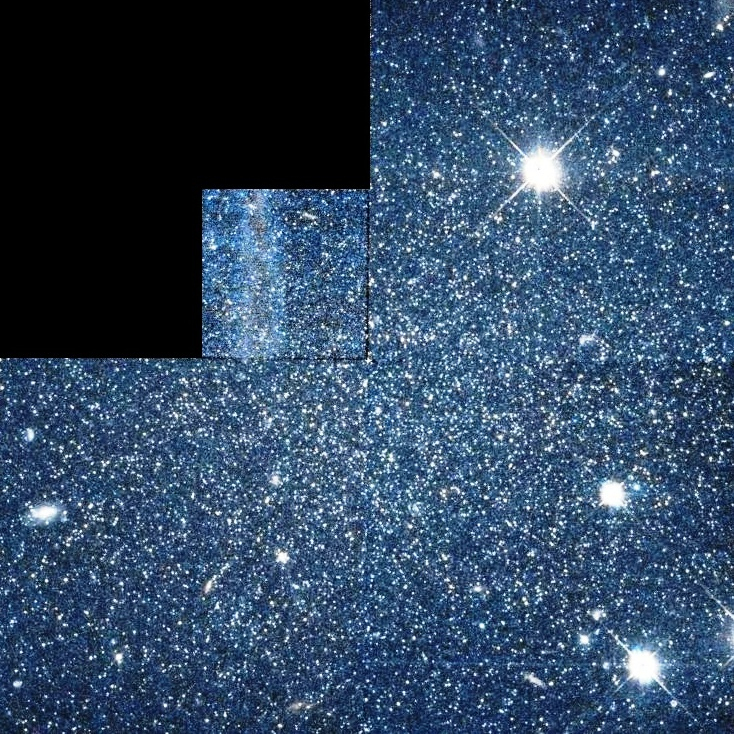
Hubble Space Telescope image of a part of the Pegasus Dwarf Spheroidal Galaxy

The Pegasus Dwarf Spheroidal is a galaxy with mainly metal-poor stellar populations. Its metallicity is [Fe/H] ≃ −1.3. It is located at the right ascension 23h51m46.30s and declination +24d34m57.0s in the equatorial coordinate system (epoch J2000.0), and in a distance of about 830 kpc from Earth and a distance of 281.6 kpc from the Andromeda Galaxy.

The galaxy was discovered in 1999 by various authors on the Second Palomar Observatory Sky Survey (POSS II) films.

== See also ==
- List of Andromeda's satellite galaxies
- Pegasus Dwarf Irregular Galaxy (Peg DIG)
- Pegasus galaxy, the Stargate Atlantis fictional location (probably the Pegasus Dwarf Irregular Galaxy).
