= Antlia-Sextans Group =

Galaxy group in the constellations of Hydra, Sextans, Antlia and Leo

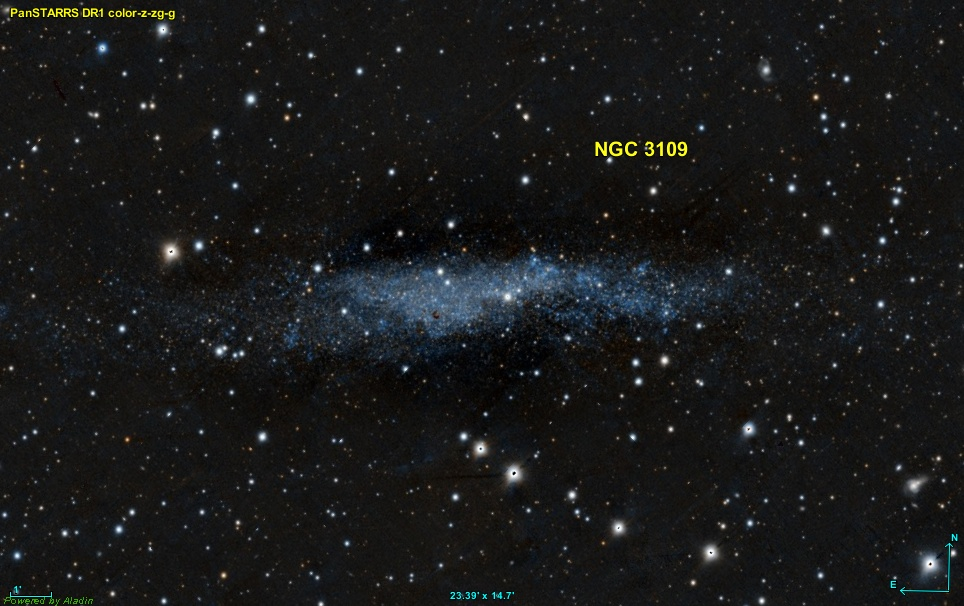
NGC 3109, largest and dominant member, optical image from Pan-STARRS Optical Galaxy Survey

The Antlia-Sextans Group is a small Galaxy group in the constellations Hydra, Sextans, Antlia and Leo. It is, on average, approximately 4.3 million light-years away from the Milky Way. It is generally considered to be at the very edge of the Local Group and thus part of it. However, other researchers indicate it is an independent Galaxy group, unlikely to be gravitationally bound to the Local Group due to probably lying outside the Local Group's Zero-velocity surface, and thus the nearest Galaxy group to the Local Group rather than a subgroup within the Local Group. Nonetheless—this possible independence may disappear as the Milky Way continues coalescing with Andromeda due to the increased mass, and density thereof, plausibly widening the radius of the Zero-velocity surface of the Local Group.

== Members ==
The Antlia-Sextans Group consists of the galaxies NGC 3109, Sextans A, Sextans B, Antlia Dwarf, Leo P and Antlia B. Leo A might also belong to the group, but this is considered unlikely.

=== NGC 3109 ===
NGC 3109 is the largest and dominant member of this group, with a diameter of 41,700 light-years, almost half the diameter of the Milky Way. It was the first discovered member of the group, discovered in 1835. It is also second closest to Earth, at a distance of 4.348 million light-years away. It was thought to be an irregular galaxy, but is now theorized to possibly be a barred spiral. It seems to be a galaxy with no central core. Based on spectroscopy of blue supergiants in NGC 3109, it is known that the galaxy has a low metallicity, similar to that to the Small Magellanic Cloud. It is one of the most metal-poor galaxies in the Local group, if it is included. NGC 3109 seems to contain an unusually large number of planetary nebulae for its luminosity. It also contains a substantial amount of dark matter.

From measurements of the neutral atomic hydrogen in the galaxy, it has been found that the disk of NGC 3109 is warped.

=== Antlia Dwarf ===
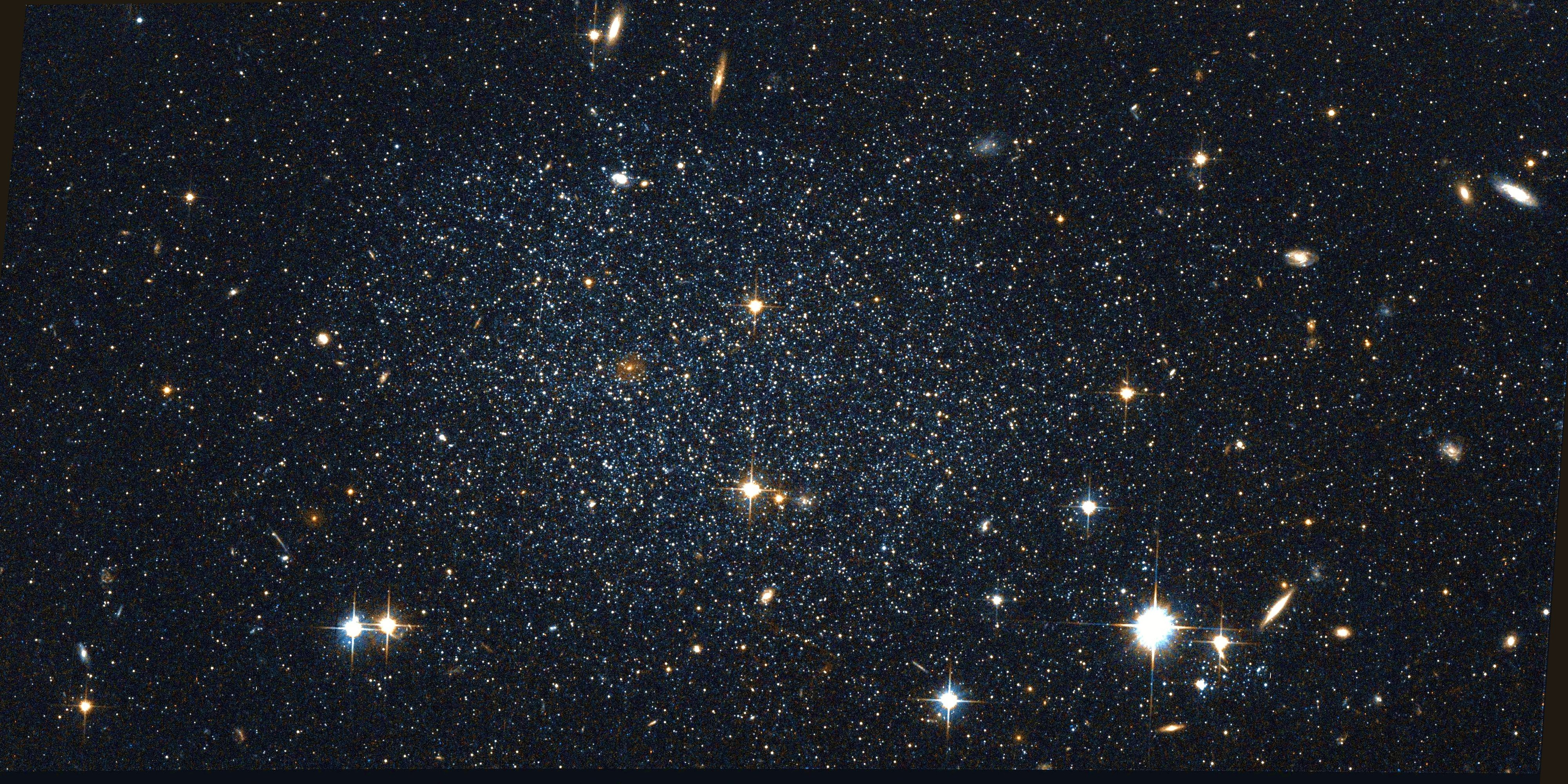
Antlia Dwarf, by Hubble Space Telescope

Antlia Dwarf is the smallest and closest galaxy in the group, only 2,610 light-years in diameter at a distance of 4.305 million light-years. The gas in the Antlia Dwarf galaxy has the same radial velocity as a warp in the disk of NGC 3109, indicating that the two galaxies had a close encounter approximately one billion years ago.

=== Sextans A ===
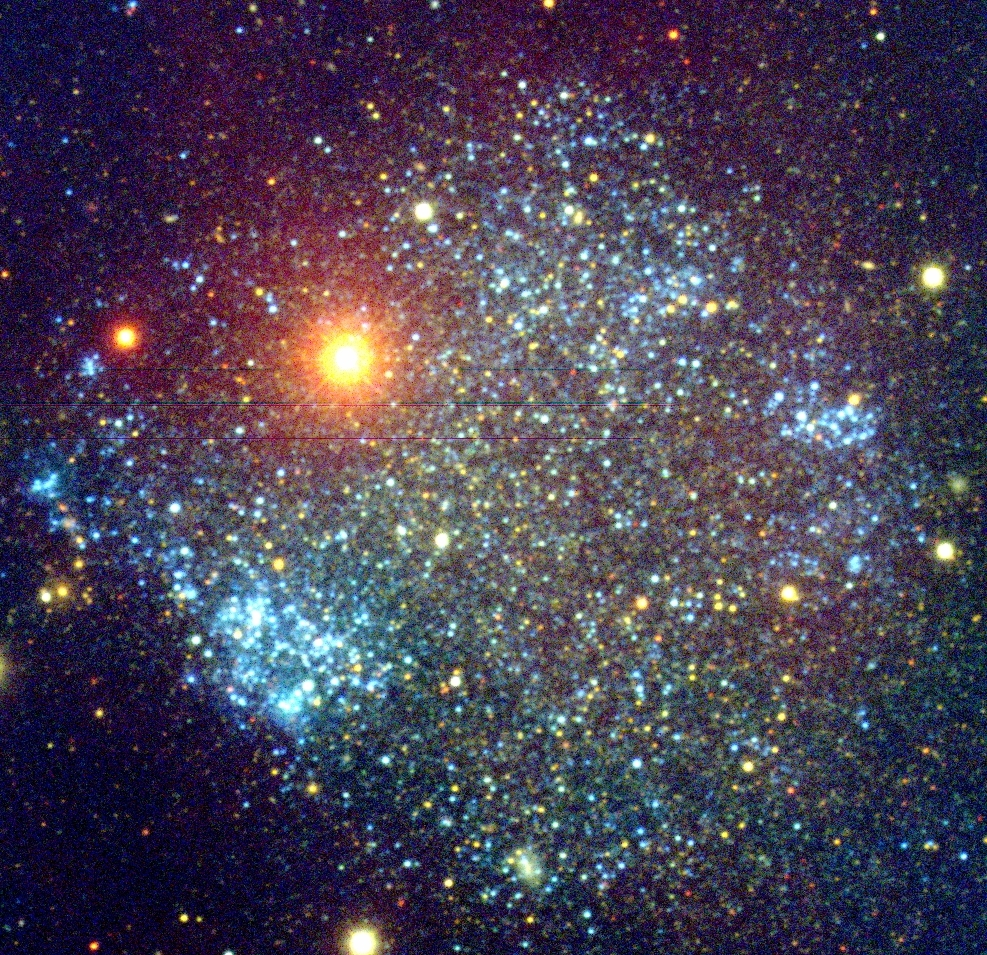
Square-shaped Sextans A, with bright star clusters and bright Milky Way's foreground star

Sextans A is 7,990 light-years in diameter, and square-shaped, and contains numerous star clusters, located at the distance of about 4.658 million light-years away. Sextans A has a peculiar square shape. Massive short-lived stars exploded in supernovae that caused more star formation, triggering yet more supernovae, ultimately resulting in an expanding shell. Young blue stars now highlight areas and shell edges high in current star formation, which from the perspective of observers on Earth appears roughly square. The 10.4m telescope Gran Telescopio Canarias recently observed the OB-type stars that power the giant HII regions. Sextans A have formed a pair with the most remote galaxy in the group, Sextans B.

=== Sextans B ===
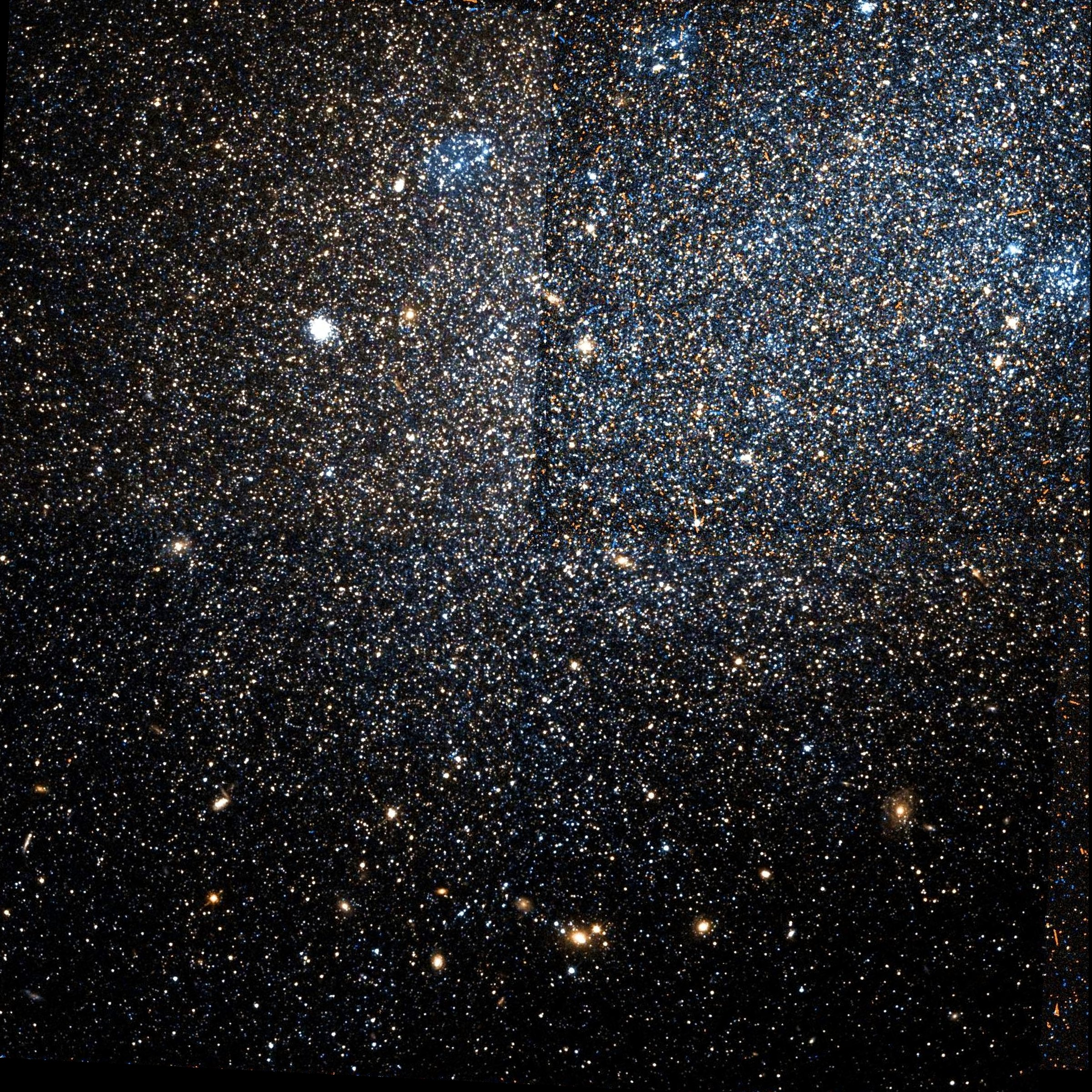
Sextans B, by Hubble Space Telescope

Sextans B is the second largest galaxy in the group, with a diameter of 8,900 light-years. Sextans B is the most distant from Earth in the group, at 5.101 million light-years away. Sextans B has a uniform stellar population, but the interstellar medium in it may be inhomogeneous. Its mass is estimated to be about 2 × 10^{8} times the mass of the Sun, of which 5.5 × 10^{7} is in the form of atomic hydrogen. Star formation in the galaxy seems to have proceeded in distinct periods of low intensity, separated by shorter periods of no activity. The existence of Cepheid variables in the galaxy implies that Sextans B contains at least some young stars. The metallicity of Sextans B is rather low, with a value of approximately Z = 0.001. Sextans B is receding from the Milky Way with a speed of approximately 300 kilometres per second (190 mi/s), and probably lies just outside the edge of the Local Group, so as its neighbour Sextans A.

Five planetary nebulae have been identified in Sextans B, which is one of the smallest galaxies where planetary nebulae have been observed. These appear point-like and can be identified by their spectral emission lines. It also contains a massive globular cluster.

=== Leo P ===
Leo P (AGC 208583) is a small irregular galaxy discovered in 2013. It is only 0.4 Mpc from the Sextans B, so it is considered as a member of this grouping. It is the most distant member of all, with a distance of 5.3 million light years.

=== Antlia B ===
Antlia B is recently discovered small galaxy. It is known to be a satellite of NGC 3109 situated at the distance of 1.35±0.06 Mpc and is similar to the Antlia Dwarf in many ways. Antlia B is transitioning from an irregular galaxy to a dwarf spheroidal. It contains mainly metal poor old stars, although a small number of young blue stars (<1 Gyr) is present. The galaxy possesses a substantial (~300,000 solar masses) amount of neutral hydrogen but no outgoing star formation.

Members of the Antlia-Sextans Group
| Name | Type | R.A. (J2000) | Dec. (J2000) | Redshift (km/s) | Apparent Magnitude |
|---|---|---|---|---|---|
| NGC 3109 | SB(s)m | 10^{h} 03^{m} 06.9^{s} | −26° 09′ 34″ | +403 ± 1 | 10.4 |
| Sextans A | IBm | 10^{h} 11^{m} 00.8^{s} | −04° 41′ 34″ | +324 ± 2 | 11.9 |
| Sextans B | ImIV–V | 10^{h} 00^{m} 00.1^{s} | +05° 19′ 56″ | +300 ± 0 | 11.9 |
| Antlia Dwarf | dSph/Irr | 10^{h} 04^{m} 03.9^{s} | −27° 19′ 55″ | +362 ± 0 | 15.67 ± 0.02 |
| Leo P | Irr | 10^{h} 21^{m} 45.1^{s} | +18° 05' 17" | N/A | 16.9 |
| Antlia B | dTrans | 9^{h} 48^{m} 56^{s} | −25° 59' 24" | +376 | 16.0 ± 0.6 |

== See also ==
- List of nearest galaxies
