= Magellanic Bridge =

Stream of neutral hydrogen gas linking the two Magellanic clouds

- Stars being pulled from the SMC, heading towards the LMC, as seen by Gaia.
- Object type: H I region

Observation data (Epoch J2000.0)
- Right ascension: 03^{h} 11^{m}
- Declination: −73.5°
- Mass: (3–5)×10^{5} M_{☉}
- Estimated age: 0.2–1.5 Gyr
- Related media on Wikimedia Commons

The Magellanic Bridge (MBR) is a stream of low density neutral hydrogen (HI) that links the two Magellanic Clouds, with a few known stars inside it. Though the stream is low density, it is still capable of star formation. The entire stream has a mass of (3–5)×10^{5} M_{☉}.

The Magellanic bridge is probably between 200 million and 1.5 billion years of age based on the metallicity of the oldest stars in the region and N-body models.

It should not be confused with the Magellanic Stream, which links the Magellanic Clouds to the Milky Way. The bridge was discovered in 1963 by J. V. Hindman et al.

== Stars ==
There is a continuous stream of stars throughout the Magellanic Bridge linking the Large Magellanic Cloud (LMC) with the Small Magellanic Cloud (SMC). This stellar bridge is of greater concentration in the western part, representing bright young stars that do not travel very far in their short lifetimes, born from primordial-like gas in Star Formation Regions that have been pulled and become unbound ("tidally stripped") from the weaker gravitational field of the SMC. There are two major density clumps, one near the SMC, the other midway between the galaxies, referred to as the OGLE Island.

O-type stars have been discovered in the Magellanic Bridge. Theses stars have been shown to have low Iron abundances in a metallicity regime comparable to the dwarf galaxies of Sextans A and Leo P.
