= NGC 796 =

Open star cluster in the constellation of Hydrus

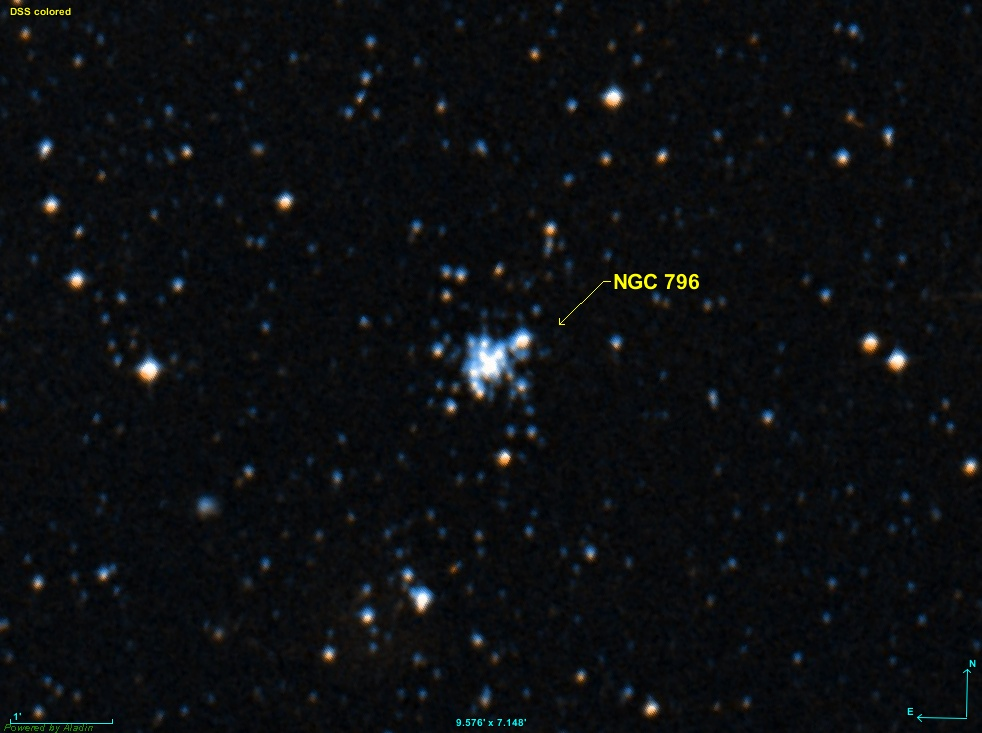
- The open cluster NGC 796

Observation data (J2000 epoch)
- Right ascension: 01^{h} 57^{m} 03^{s}
- Declination: −74° 05′ 47″
- Distance: 192,432 (58,999)

Physical characteristics
- Mass: 900 M_{☉}
- Radius: 4.56
- Estimated age: 20+12 −15Myr

Associations
- Constellation: Hydrus

NGC 796 (also known as ESO 30-6) is a massive young open cluster located in the constellation Hydrus, with an estimated mass of 990M_{☉} and an estimated core radius of 4.56 ly (1.4 pc). It is located in the Magellanic Bridge, between both Magellanic Clouds at an approximate distance of 192,432 light years, (59 kpc) from the Earth and was discovered by 19th century English astronomer John Herschel on 18 September 1835.
