= Sextans B =

Dwarf irregular galaxy in the constellation Sextans

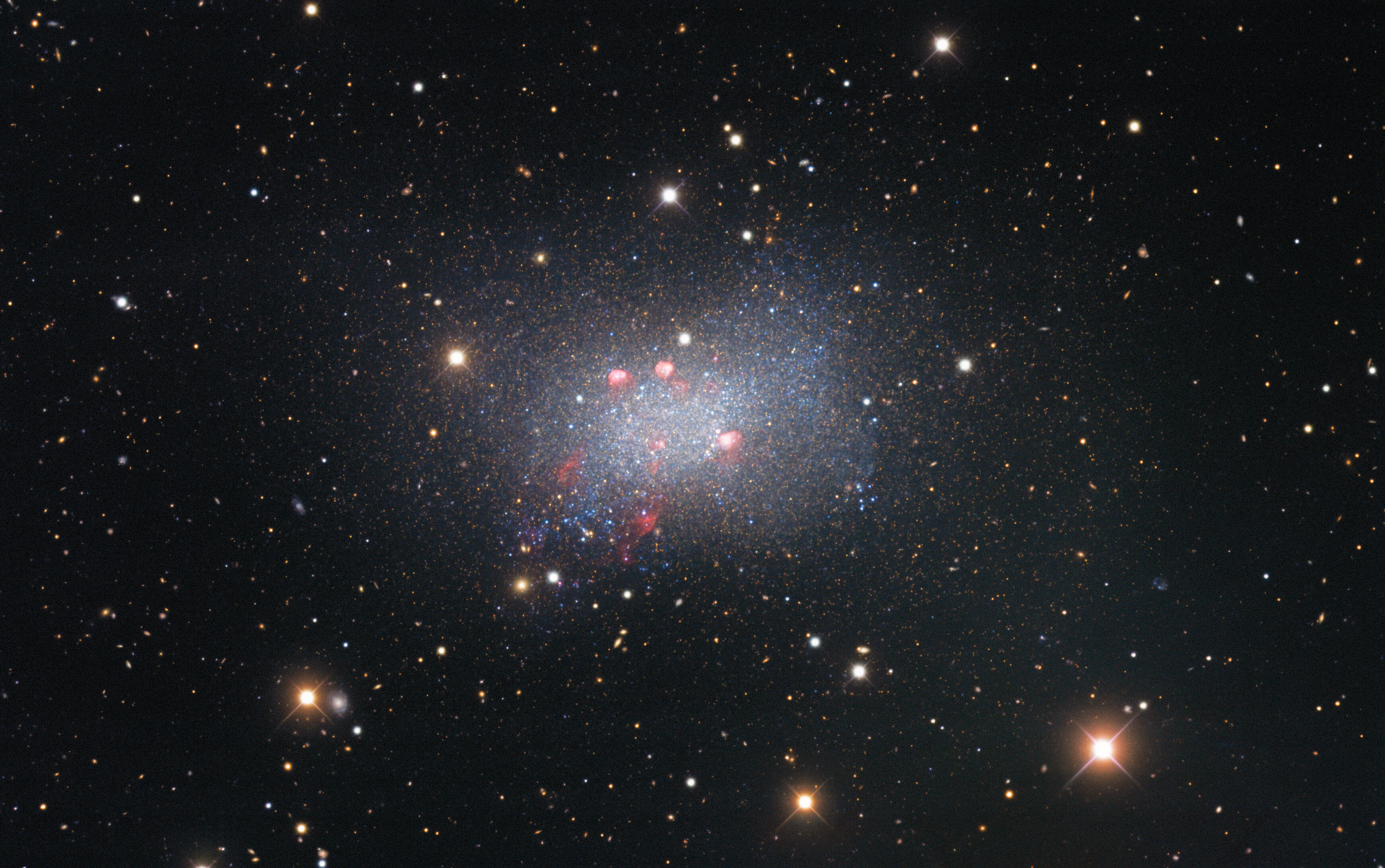
- Sextans B, imaged by the 4-meter Telescope at Kitt Peak National Observatory

Observation data (J2000 epoch)
- Constellation: Sextans
- Right ascension: 10^{h} 00^{m} 00.1^{s}
- Declination: +05° 19′ 56″
- Redshift: 301 ± 1 km/s
- Distance: 4.44 ± 0.23 Mly (1.36 ± 0.07 Mpc)
- Apparent magnitude (V): 11.9

Characteristics
- Type: ImIV–V
- Size: ~8,900 ly (2.73 kpc) (estimated)
- Apparent size (V): 5.1′ × 3.5′

Other designations
- DDO 70, UGC 5373, MCG +01-26-005, PGC 28913, CGCG 036-012

Sextans B (also known as UGC 5373 and DDO 70) is an irregular galaxy that may be part of the Local Group, or lie just beyond it. The earliest known reference to this galaxy is from a 1954 paper by Edison Pettit in The Astrophysical Journal, where it was listed as "Wilson Dwarf".

Sextans B is 4.44 million light-years away from Earth and thus is one of the most distant members of the Local Group, if it is indeed a member. It forms a pair with its neighbouring galaxy Sextans A. It is a type Ir IV–V galaxy according to the galaxy morphological classification scheme. Sextans B may also be gravitationally associated with the galaxies NGC 3109 and the Antlia Dwarf.

Sextans B has a uniform stellar population, but the interstellar medium in it may be inhomogeneous. Its mass is estimated to be about 2×10^{8} times the mass of the Sun, of which 5.5×10^{7} is in the form of atomic hydrogen. Star formation in the galaxy seems to have proceeded in distinct periods of low intensity, separated by shorter periods of no activity. The existence of Cepheid variables in the galaxy implies that Sextans B contains at least some young stars. The metallicity of Sextans B is very low, with a value of approximately Z = 0.001. Sextans B is receding from the Milky Way with a speed of approximately 300 kilometres per second (190 mi/s), and probably lies just outside the edge of the Local Group, so as its neighbour Sextans A.

Five planetary nebulae have been identified in Sextans B, which is one of the smallest galaxies where planetary nebulae have been observed. These appear point-like and can be identified by their spectral emission lines. It also contains a massive globular cluster.

Although no supernovae have been observed in Sextans B, the galaxy is close enough for classical novae to be detected. The first confirmed nova in this galaxy was discovered by ATLAS at magnitude 18.553 on 10 November 2024, and designated AT 2024aawe.
