= David Dunlap Observatory Catalogue =

Astronomical catalogue of dwarf galaxies

David Dunlap Observatory Catalogue, also known as the DDO or A Catalogue of Dwarf Galaxies, is a catalogue of dwarf galaxies that was compiled by Sidney van den Bergh and published by the David Dunlap Observatory of the University of Toronto in 1959, and later expanded in 1966.

== Examples ==
=== DDO 3 ===
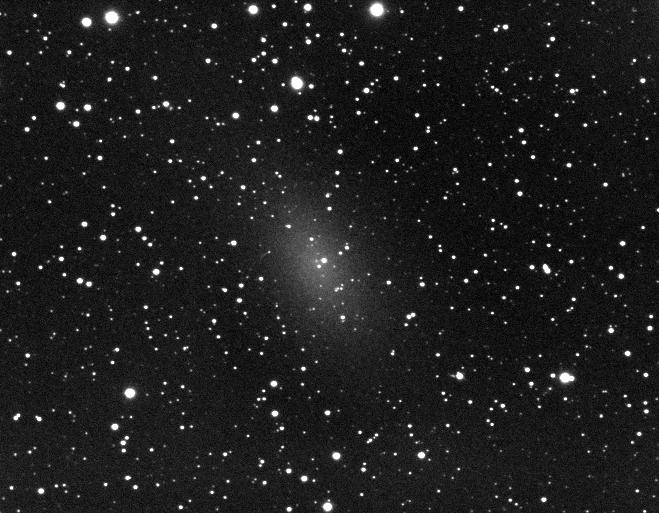
DDO 3

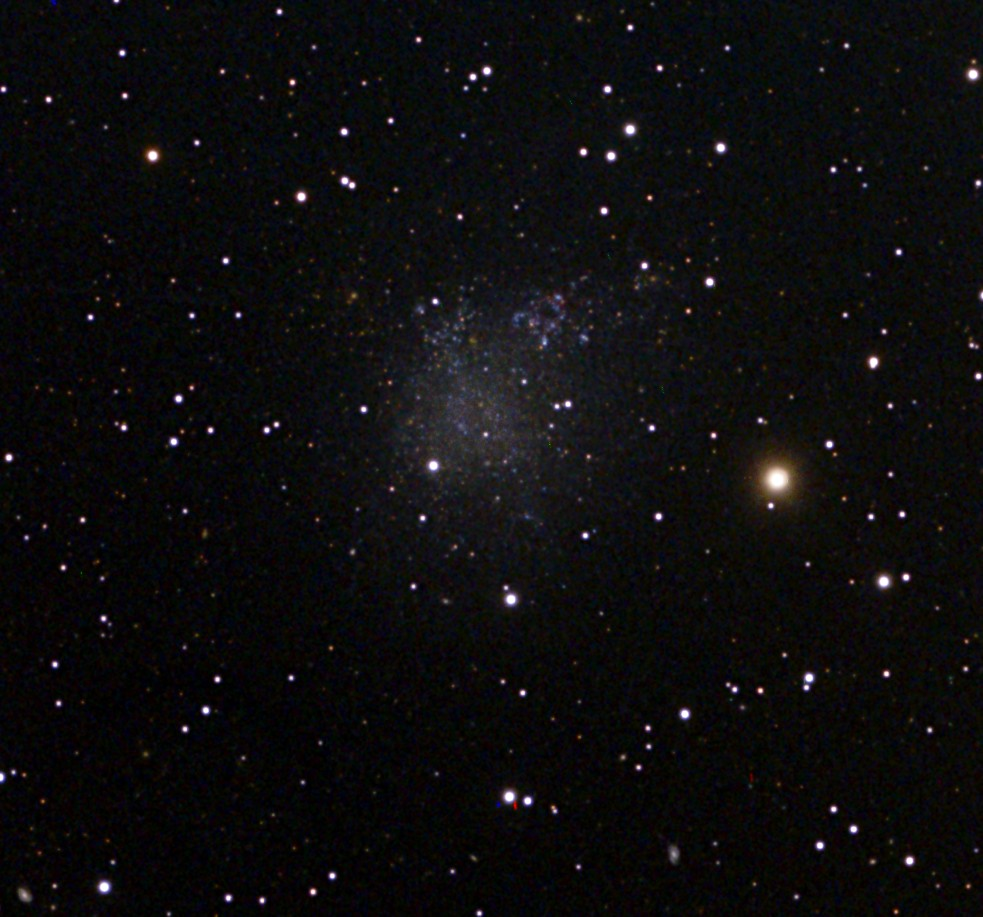
DDO 8

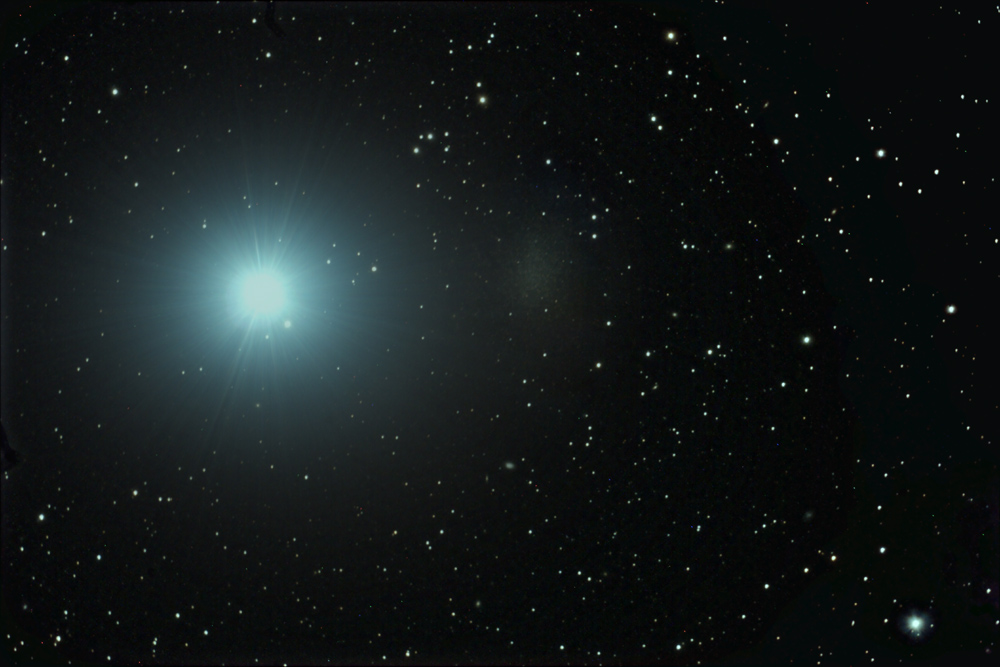
DDO 74 appears as a faint patch on the right hand side of Regulus.

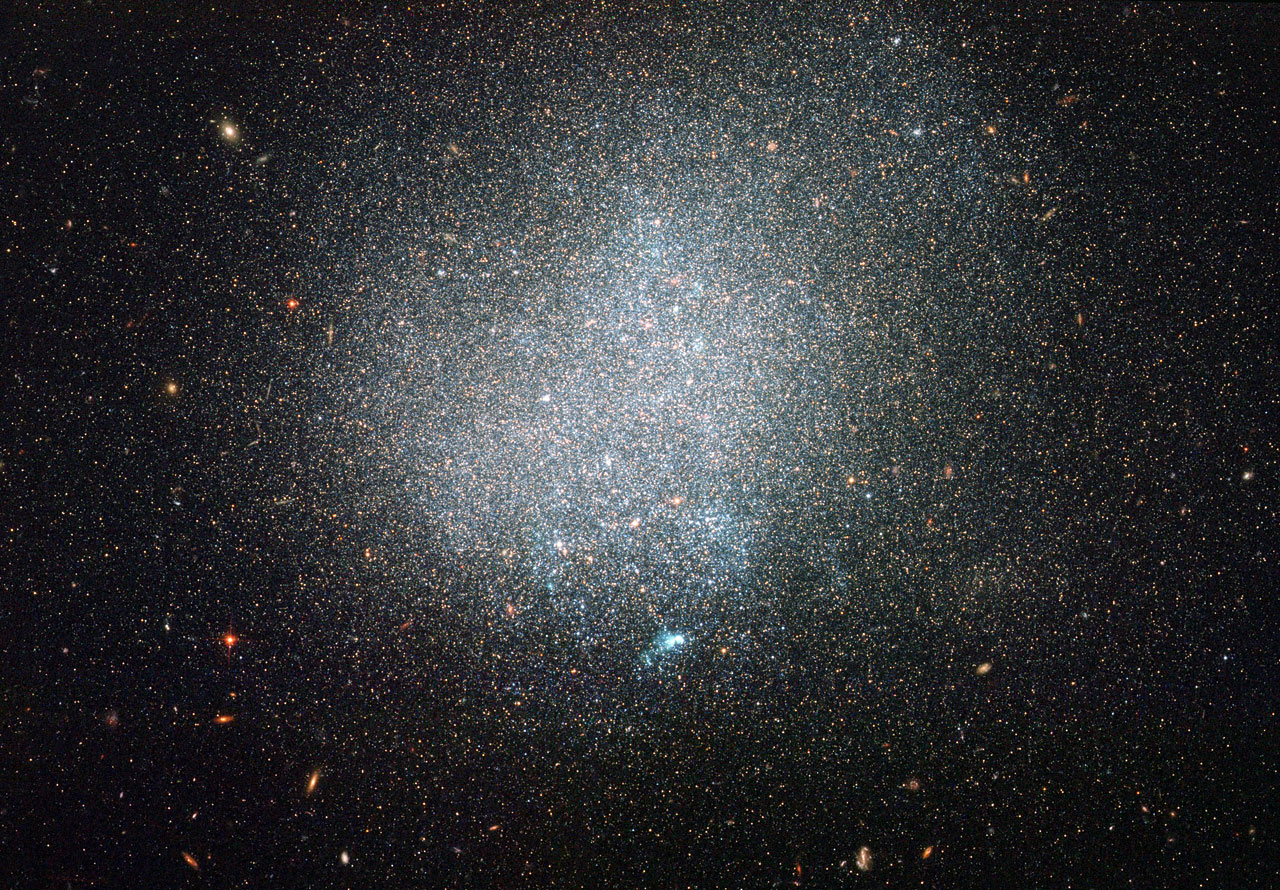
DDO 190. This photo was taken by Hubble Space Telescope.

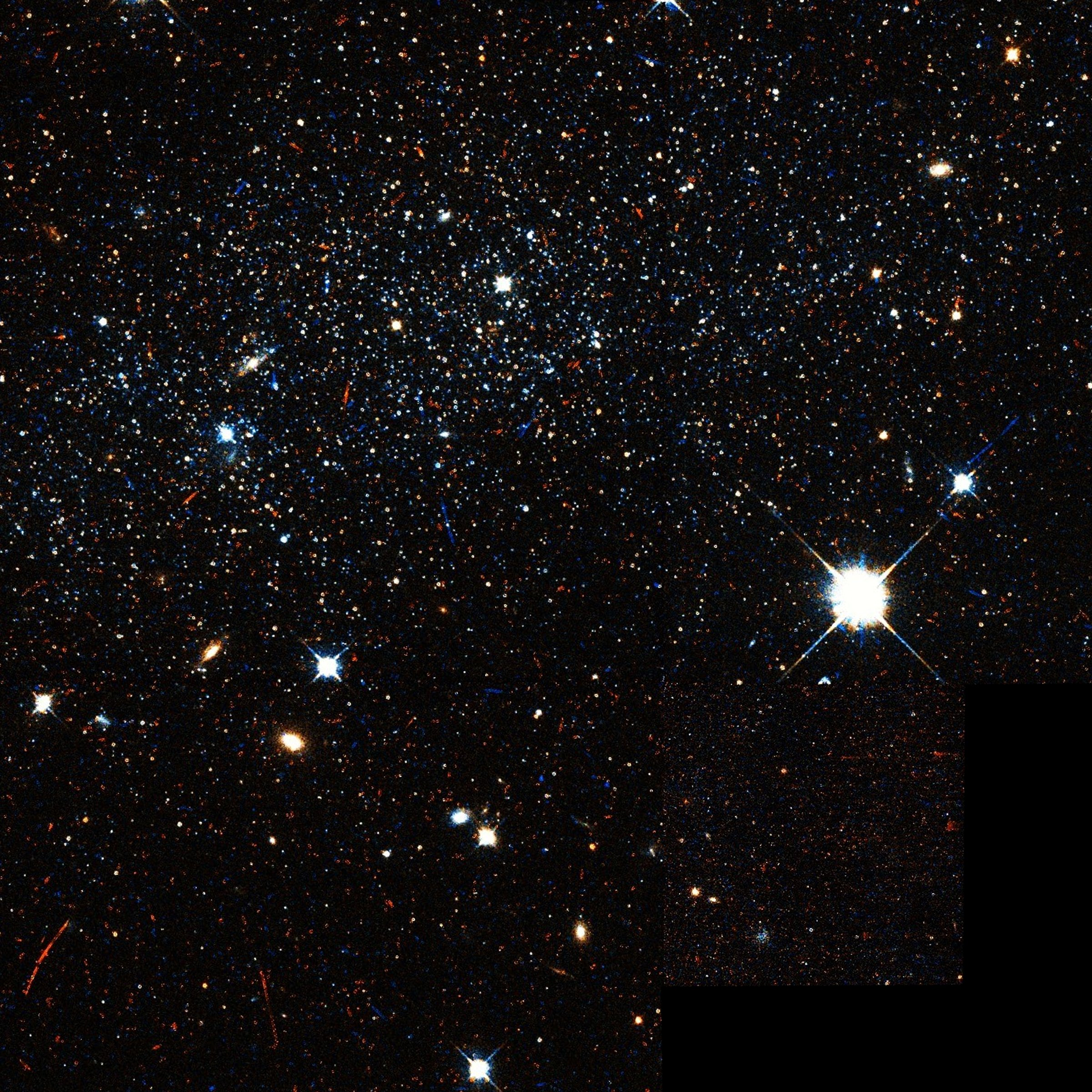
DDO 210 (Aquarius Dwarf) in the constellation of Aquarius.

DDO 3 (also known as NGC 147, PGC 2004, UGC 326, LEDA 2004 or Caldwell 17) is a dwarf spheroidal galaxy which is located in the northern constellation of Cassiopeia, near the border of Andromeda. It is a small satellite galaxy of the famous Messier 31, which is the largest galaxy in the Local Group.

=== DDO 8 ===
DDO 8 (also known as IC 1613, PGC 3844, UGC 668 or Caldwell 51) is a dwarf irregular galaxy in the constellation Cetus, near the border of Pisces. It was discovered in 1906 by a German astronomer Max Wolf. It is a member of the Local Group.

=== DDO 69 ===
DDO 69 (also known as Leo A, Leo III, PGC 28868 or UGC 5364) is an irregular galaxy which is located in the constellation of Leo. It is a small satellite galaxy of the Milky Way.

=== DDO 70 ===
DDO 70 (also known as Sextans B, PGC 28913 or UGC 5373) is an irregular galaxy which is in the constellation of Sextans. It is located 4.44 million light years away from Earth.

=== DDO 74 ===
DDO 74 (also known as Leo I, Regulus Dwarf, PGC 29488 or UGC 5470) lies approximately 820,000 light years away in the constellation Leo. It is one of the most distant satellite galaxy of the Milky Way. The dwarf spheroidal galaxy is located only 12 arcminutes from Regulus (α Leonis), and the light from Regulus makes the visibility of DDO 74 becomes poor, so it is difficult to be observed.

=== DDO 75 ===
DDO 75 (also known as Sextans A, PGC 29653 or UGCA 205) is an irregular galaxy located in the constellation Sextans, same as its neighbour DDO 70 (Sextans B). When it is observed from Earth, it appears as a square in shape.

=== DDO 82 ===
DDO 82 (also known as PGC 30997, UGC 5692, MCG+12-10-045 or CGCG 333-35) is a Magellanic spiral galaxy lies 13 million light years away in the constellation Ursa Major.

=== DDO 93 ===
DDO 93 (also known as Leo II or PGC 34176) is a dwarf spheroidal galaxy which is located in the constellation of Leo. It was discovered in 1950 by Robert George Harrington and Albert George Wilson. It is one of the satellite galaxies of the Milky Way.

=== DDO 155 ===
DDO 155 (also known as GR 8, PGC 44491 or UGC 8091) is a dwarf irregular galaxy located approximately 7.9 million light years away from Earth in the constellation of Virgo. A nickname for this galaxy, "Imprint of a Foot", is based on its shape.

=== DDO 169 ===
DDO 169 (also known as PGC 46127 or UGC 8331) is a dwarf irregular galaxy in the constellation Canes Venatici. It is one of the members of the M51 Group.

=== DDO 190 ===
DDO 190 (also known as UGC 9240) is a dwarf irregular galaxy which is located in the constellation of Boötes. It is a member of the M94 Group as well.

=== DDO 199 ===
DDO 199 (also known as Ursa Minor Dwarf, PGC 54074 or UGC 9749) is a dwarf spheroidal galaxy which is located in the northern constellation of Ursa Minor. It was discovered in 1955 by an American astronomer Albert George Wilson. It is a satellite of the Milky Way.

=== DDO 210 ===
DDO 210 (also known as Aquarius Dwarf or PGC 65367) is a dwarf irregular galaxy in the constellation of Aquarius. It is a member of the Local Group and lies 3.2 ± 0.2 million light years from the Milky Way.

=== DDO 216 ===
DDO 216 (also known as Pegasus Dwarf Irregular Galaxy, PGC 71538 or UGC 12613) is a dwarf irregular galaxy located in the constellation Pegasus.

== See also ==
- Aquarius
- Boötes
- Canes Venatici
- Cassiopeia
- Cetus
- Leo
- Pegasus
- Sextans
- Ursa Major
- Ursa Minor
- Virgo
