= NGC 147 =

Galaxy in the constellation Cassiopeia

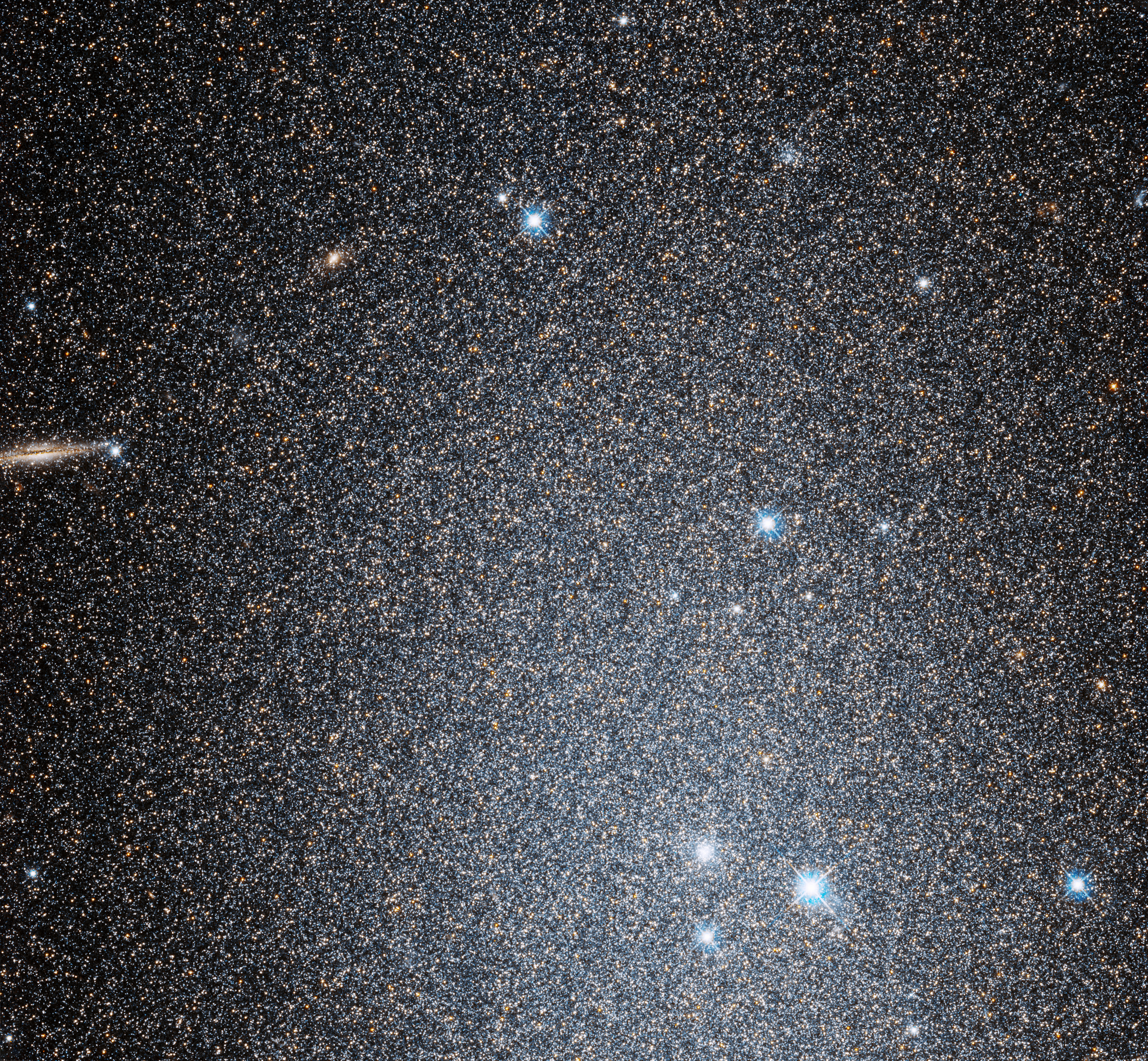
- Hubble Space Telescope image of NGC 147

Observation data (J2000 epoch)
- Constellation: Cassiopeia
- Right ascension: 00^{h} 33^{m} 12.1^{s}
- Declination: +48° 30′ 32″
- Redshift: −193±3 km/s
- Distance: 2.53 ± 0.11 Mly (780 ± 30 kpc)^{[a]}
- Apparent magnitude (V): 10.5

Characteristics
- Type: dSph/dE5
- Size: 10,700 ly (3.28 kpc) (estimated)
- Apparent size (V): 13.2′ × 7.8′
- Notable features: satellite galaxy of M31

Other designations
- PGC 2004, UGC 326, DDO 3, LEDA 2004, Caldwell 17

NGC 147 (also known as DDO3 or Caldwell 17) is a dwarf spheroidal galaxy about 2.58 Mly away in the constellation Cassiopeia. NGC 147 is a member of the Local Group of galaxies and a satellite galaxy of the Andromeda Galaxy (M31). It forms a physical pair with the nearby galaxy NGC 185, another remote satellite of M31. It was discovered by John Herschel in September 1829. Visually it is both fainter and slightly larger than NGC 185 (and therefore has a considerably lower surface brightness). This means that NGC 147 is more difficult to see than NGC 185, which is visible in small telescopes. In the Webb Society Deep-Sky Observer's Handbook, the visual appearance of NGC 147 is described as follows:

Large, quite faint, irregularly round; it brightens in the middle to a stellar nucleus.

The membership of NGC 147 in the Local Group was confirmed by Walter Baade in 1944 when he was able to resolve the galaxy into individual stars with the 100-inch (2.5 m) telescope at Mount Wilson near Los Angeles.

== Characteristics ==
A survey of the brightest asymptotic giant branch (AGB) stars in the area of radius 2′ from the center of NGC 147 shows that the last significant star-forming activity in NGC 147 occurred around 3 Gyr ago. NGC 147 contains a large population of older stars which show a spread in metallicity and age. The metallicity spread suggests that NGC 147 has had chemical enrichment. However, H I has not been observed and the interstellar medium (ISM) mass upper limit is much lower than expected had the material which is emitted from evolving stars been kept in the galaxy. This implies depletion of the ISM.

== Distance measurements ==
At least two techniques have been used to measure distances to NGC 147. The surface brightness fluctuations distance measurement technique estimates distances to spiral galaxies based on the graininess of the appearance of their bulges. The distance measured to NGC 147 using this technique is 2.67 ± 0.18 Mly (870 ± 60 kpc). However, NGC 147 is close enough that the tip of the red giant branch (TRGB) method may be used to estimate its distance. The estimated distance to NGC 147 using this technique is 2.21 ± 0.09 Mly (680 ± 30 kpc). Averaged together, these distance measurements give a distance estimate of 2.53±0.4 Mly (780±120 kpc).^{[a]}

== See also ==
- Andromeda's satellite galaxies

== Notes ==
1. average(870 ± 60, 680 ± 30) = ((870 + 680) / 2) ± ((60^{2} + 30^{2} + (870–680)^{2})^{0.5} / 3) = 780 ± 120
