= DDO 190 =

Dwarf galaxy

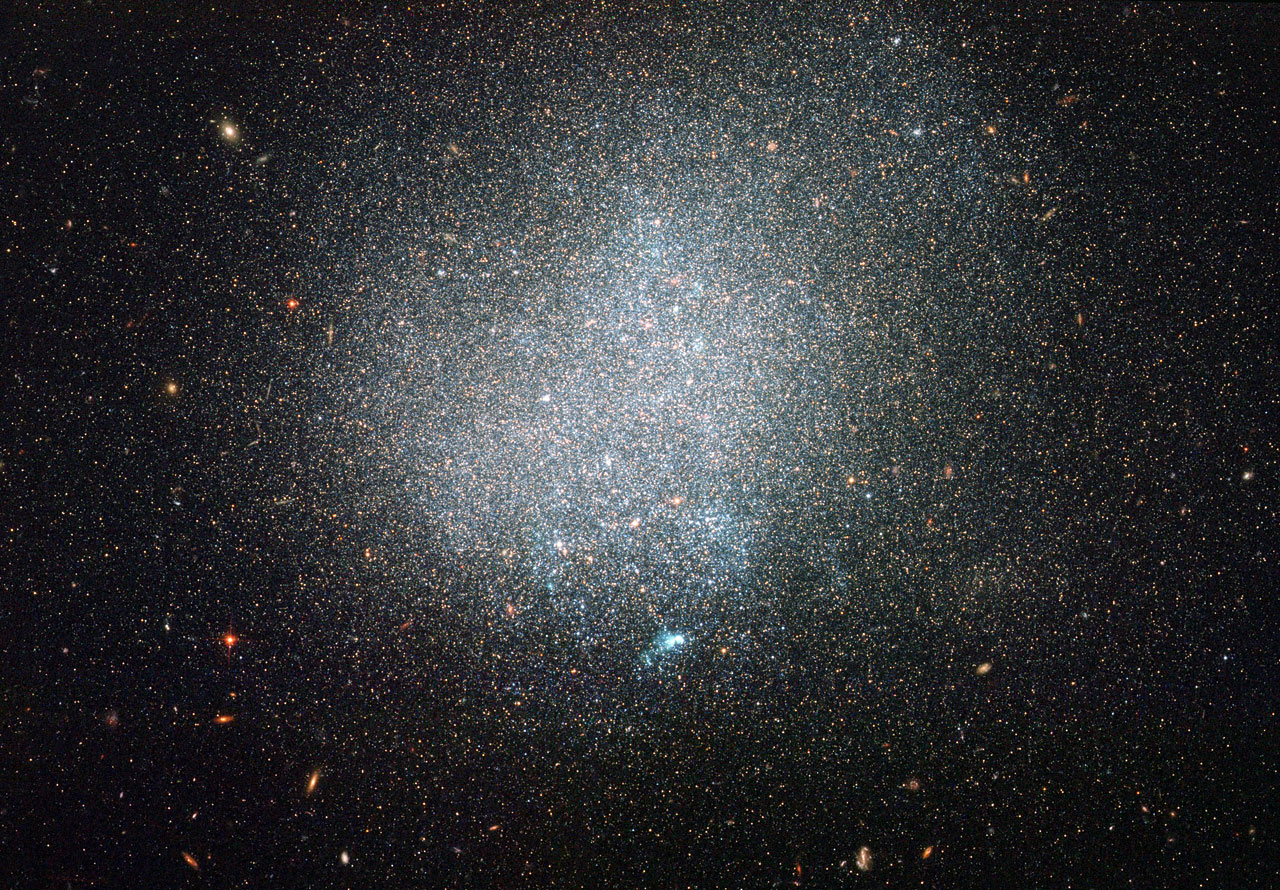
- The dwarf galaxy with pockets of ionised gas, seen as blue

Observation data (J2000 epoch)
- Right ascension: 14^{h} 24^{m} 43.08^{s}
- Declination: +44° 31′ 31.8″
- Redshift: 0.000500
- Heliocentric radial velocity: 150.0 ± 4.0 km/s
- Distance: 9.10×10^{6} ly (2.79 Mpc)h^{−1}_{0.73}
- Group or cluster: M94 Group
- Apparent magnitude (V): 13.25
- Absolute magnitude (V): -14.19

Characteristics
- Type: IAm
- Mass: 5×10^{7} M_{☉}

Other designations
- UGC 9240, MCG +08-26-030, PGC 51472

DDO 190 (or UGC 9240) is a dwarf irregular galaxy in the vicinity of the Milky Way, as it is relatively small and lacks clear structure. It is 9.10 million light-years (2.79 Mpc) away from Earth and lies out of the Local Group, determined by the tip of the red giant branch method. The outskirts of the galaxy are harbouring older (reddish) stars, while the centre is crowded with younger (bluish) stars. Heated gas is observed at several places. DDO 190 still experiences some active star formation. The galaxy is categorised as a Magellanic dwarf galaxy of morphological type Im. Its metallicity is [Fe/H] = −1.55 ± 0.12.

DDO 190 is small, but not tiny: about 15,000 light years across—about 1/6 the size of our galaxy. It is also well outside the Local Group, which contains nearby galaxies (the Andromeda galaxy is less than 3 million light years distant from Earth, for comparison), and is instead thought to be part of the M94 galaxy group. But if true it is fairly isolated even from the others on its team; the nearest neighbor appears to be another dwarf galaxy, DDO 187, at a distance of 3 million light-years (0.92 Mpc).

== History ==
The galaxy was discovered by the Canadian astronomer Sidney van den Bergh in 1959 and put in the DDO catalogue.
