= Leo I (dwarf galaxy) =

Dwarf spheroidal Galaxy in the constellation Leo

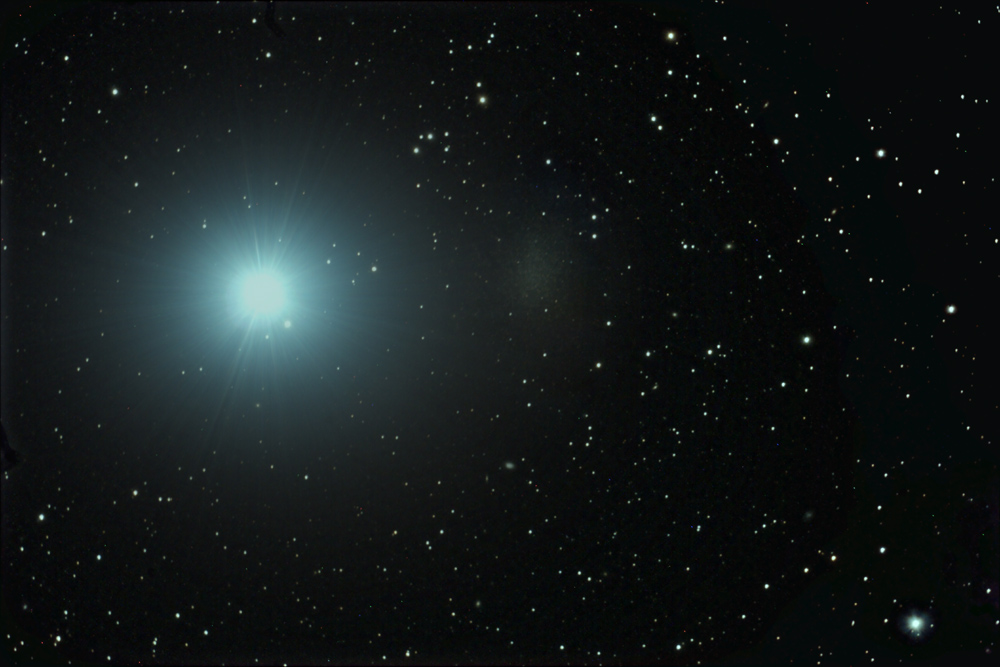
- Leo I appears as a faint patch to the right of the bright star, Regulus.

Observation data (J2000 epoch)
- Constellation: Leo
- Right ascension: 10^{h} 08^{m} 27.4^{s}
- Declination: +12° 18′ 27″
- Redshift: 285 ± 2 km/s
- Distance: 820 ± 70 kly (250 ± 20 kpc)
- Apparent magnitude (V): 11.2
- Absolute magnitude (V): −12.0

Characteristics
- Type: E;dSph
- Mass: (2.0 ± 1.0) × 10^{7} M_{☉}
- Size: 2000 ly
- Apparent size (V): 9.8′ × 7.4′
- Notable features: Milky Way satellite

Other designations
- UGC 5470, PGC 29488, DDO 74, A1006, Harrington-Wilson #1, Regulus Dwarf

Leo I is a dwarf spheroidal galaxy in the constellation Leo. At about 820,000 light-years distant, it is a member of the Local Group of galaxies and is thought to be one of the most distant satellites of the Milky Way galaxy. It was discovered in 1950 by Albert George Wilson on photographic plates of the National Geographic Society – Palomar Observatory Sky Survey, which were taken with the 48-inch Schmidt camera at Palomar Observatory.

== Visibility ==
Leo I is located only 12 arc minutes from Regulus, the brightest star in the constellation. For that reason, the galaxy is sometimes called the Regulus Dwarf. Scattered light from the star makes studying the galaxy more difficult, and it was not until the 1990s that it was detected visually.

The proximity of Regulus and the low surface brightness make it a real challenge to observe. Medium-sized amateur telescopes (15 cm or more) and a dark sky appear to be required for a sighting. But some reports of April 2013 tell that one observer with an 11 cm mini Dobson and even a refractor as small as 7 cm f/10 has sighted Leo I under very dark sky conditions.

== Mass ==
The measurement of radial velocities of some bright red giants in Leo I have made possible to measure its mass. It was found to be at least (2.0 ± 1.0) × 10^{7} M_{☉}. The results are not conclusive, and do not exclude or confirm the existence of a large dark matter halo around the galaxy. However, it seems to be certain that the galaxy does not rotate.

A kinematic study of Leo I suggested the presence of a black hole of three million solar masses in the center of the galaxy. This would be significant, as it would be the first time this has been done with a dwarf spheroidal galaxy. A black hole of three million solar masses is comparable to the mass of the Milky Way's black hole, Sagittarius A*. However, another study could not confirm this, suggesting at most an intermediate-mass black hole of a few 10^{5} solar masses. Among the Milky Way's satellites that are classical dwarf spheroidal galaxies, it has the highest density of dark matter.

It has been suggested that Leo I is a tidal debris stream in the outer halo of the Milky Way. This hypothesis has not been confirmed, however.

== Star formation ==
Typical to a dwarf galaxy, the metallicity of Leo I is very low, only one percent that of the Sun. Gallart et al. (1999) deduce from Hubble Space Telescope observations that the galaxy experienced a major increase (accounting for 70% to 80% of its population) in its star formation rate between 6 Ga and 2 Ga (billion years ago). There is no significant evidence of any stars that are more than 10 Ga old. About 1 Ga ago, star formation in Leo I appears to have dropped suddenly to an almost negligible rate, roughly coinciding with its latest periastron passage of the Milky Way. Ram pressure stripping would have removed its gas, decreasing its star formation rate. Some low-level activity may have continued until 200-500 Ma. Therefore, it is thought to be the youngest dwarf spheroidal satellite galaxy of the Milky Way. In addition, the galaxy may be embedded in a cloud of ionized gas with a mass similar to that of the whole galaxy.
