= GR 8 (galaxy) =

Gas rich-dwarf galaxy in the constellation Virgo

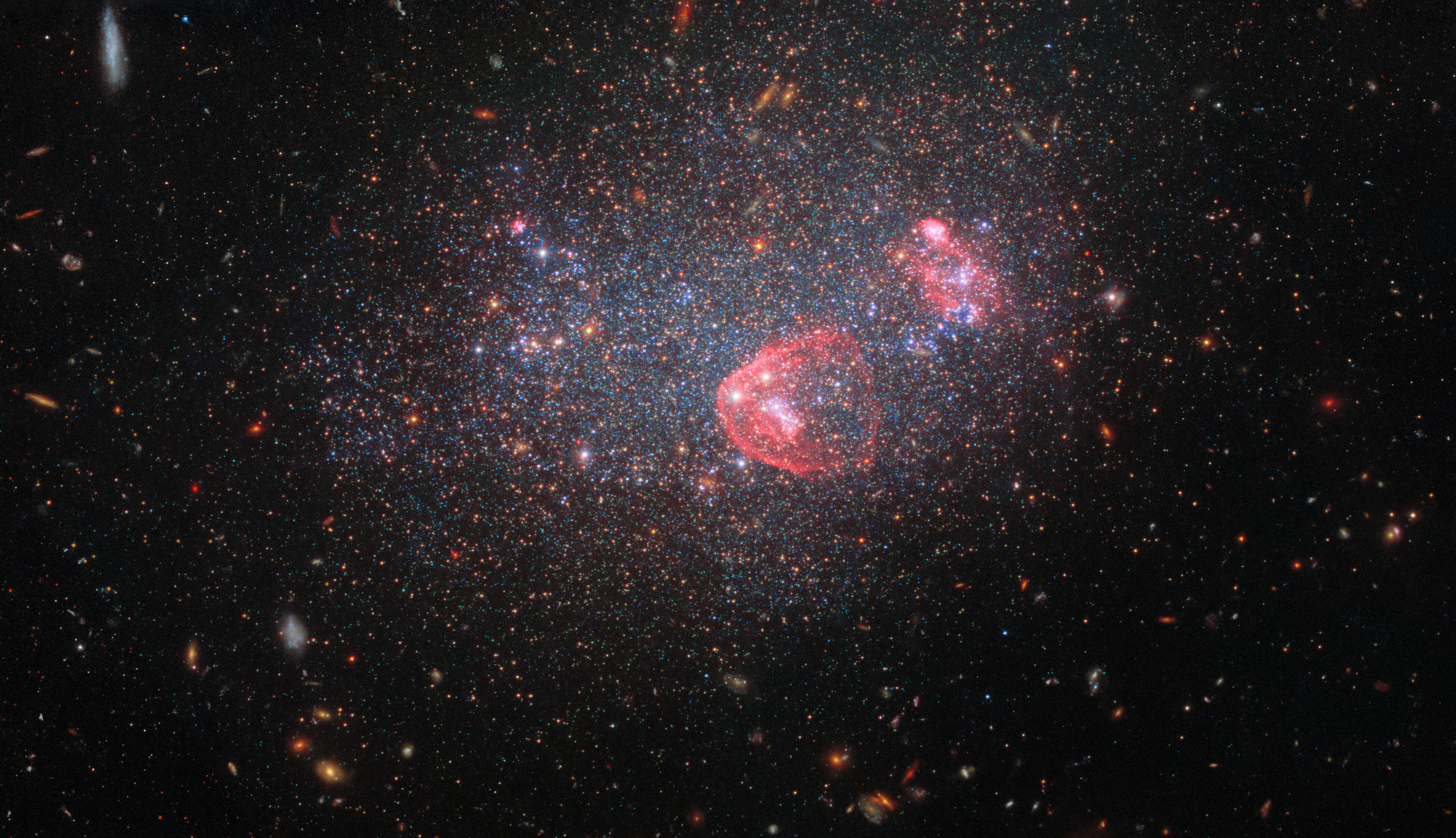
- UGC 8091 imaged by the Hubble Space Telescope

Observation data (J2000 epoch)
- Constellation: Virgo
- Right ascension: 12^{h} 58^{m} 40.4^{s}
- Declination: +14° 13′ 03″
- Redshift: 214 ± 0 km/s
- Distance: 7.9 Mly (2.4 Mpc)
- Apparent magnitude (V): 14.7

Characteristics
- Type: ImV
- Apparent size (V): 1′.1 × 1′.0

Other designations
- PGC 44491, DDO 155, GR 8, Imprint of a Foot

GR 8 (also known as UGC 8091) is a gas-rich dwarf irregular galaxy. In 1995, Tolstoy et al. estimated its distance (with the Hipparcos correction of 1997 applied) to be approximately 7.9 million light-years (5.0×10^{11} AU) from Earth. It is around 2.8 Mly from UGC 9128. It is still an open question whether it is a member of the Local Group or possibly the Virgo Cluster.

GR 8 was discovered at the Lick Observatory using the 20-inch astrograph in either 1946, 1947, or 1951.
