= UGC 5692 =

Spiral galaxy in Ursa Major

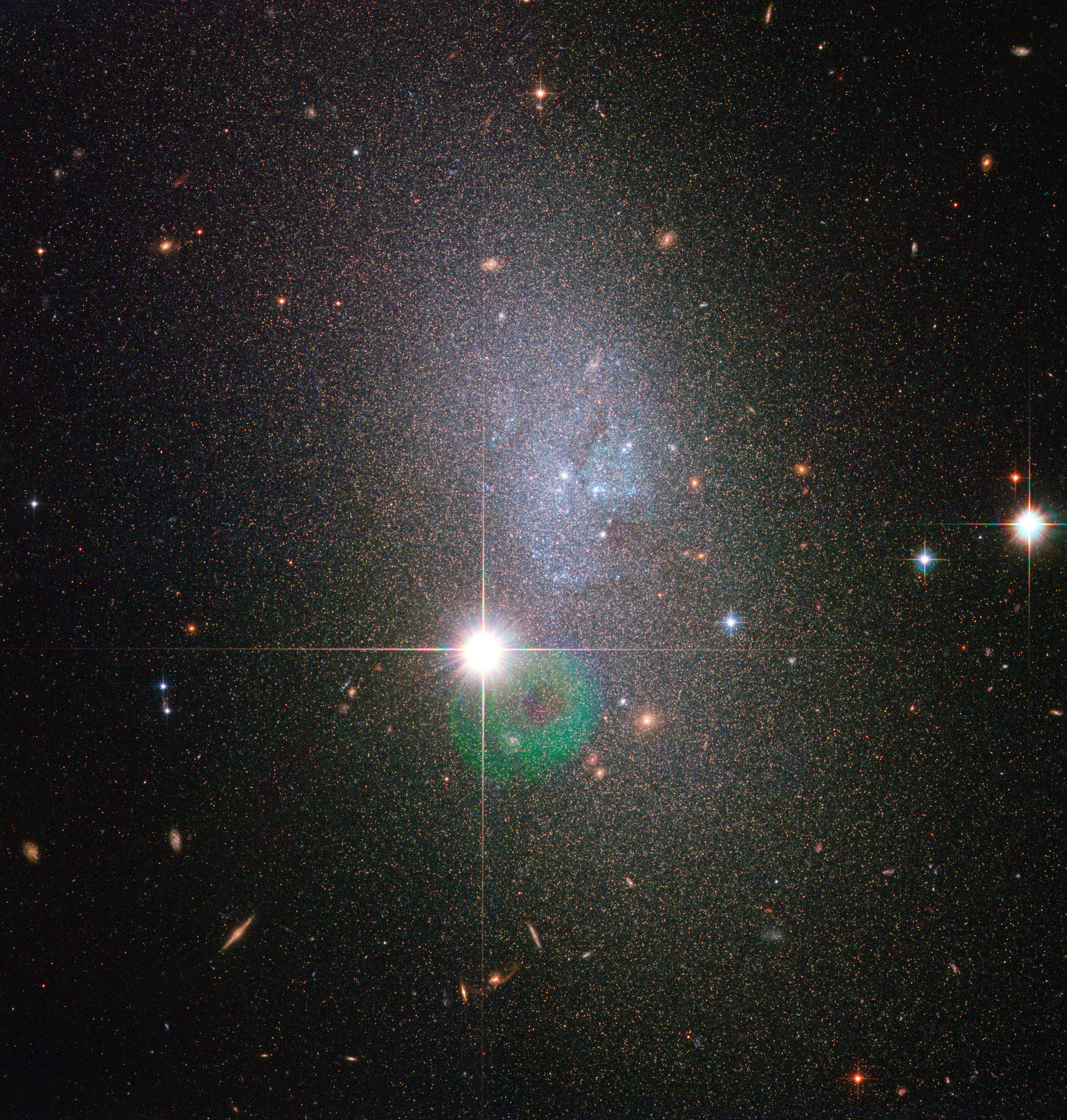

Observation data (J2000 epoch)
- Constellation: Ursa Major
- Right ascension: 10^{h} 30^{m} 36.58^{s}
- Declination: +70° 37′ 06.0″
- Redshift: 0.000187 ± 0.000010
- Heliocentric radial velocity: 56 ± 3 km/s
- Galactocentric velocity: 171 ± 5 km/s
- Distance: 13,000 ± 00 kly (3,986 ± 0 kpc)h^{−1}_{0.73}
- Apparent magnitude (V): 11.36
- Absolute magnitude (V): -16.65

Characteristics
- Type: dG
- Mass: 0×10^{0} M_{☉}
- Apparent size (V): 3.2 × 1.8 arcmin

Other designations
- PGC 30997, UZC J103034.8+703714, [B93] 27, Anon 1026+70 B, MCG +12-10-045, CGCG 333-35, [LSK86] 126, DDO 82 SPB 142, Z 1026.8+7053, [MI94] Sm 52

UGC 5692 is a Magellanic-type spiral galaxy located 13 million light years away in the constellation of Ursa Major and it is considered to be a member of the Messier 81 Group. An alternate designation DDO 82 is named for the David Dunlap Observatory Catalogue. The galaxy was added to this list in 1959 by Sidney van den Bergh.
