= UGC 9128 =

Galaxy in the constellation Boötes

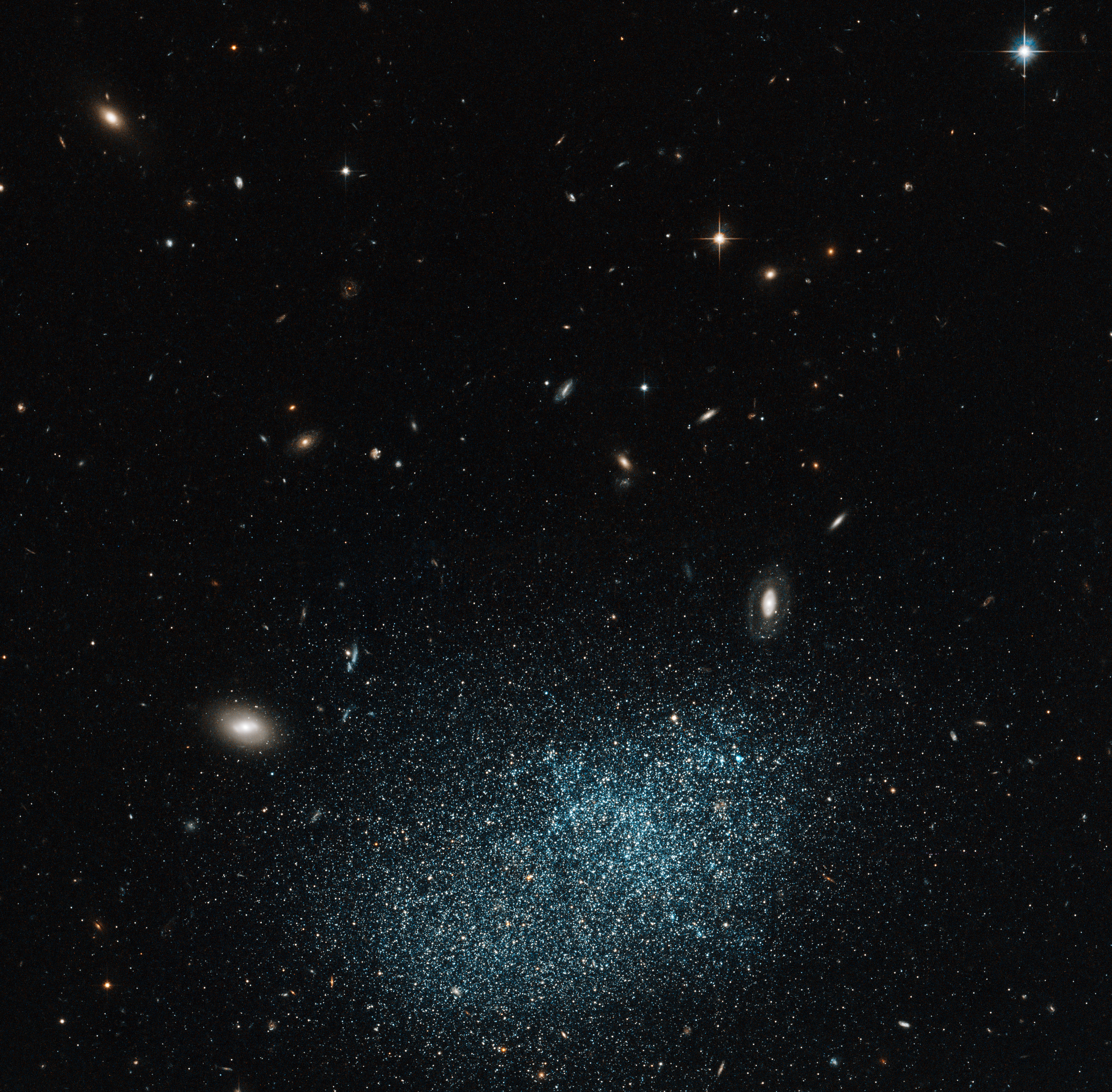
- UGC 9128 imaged by the Hubble Space Telescope

Observation data (J2000 epoch)
- Constellation: Boötes
- Right ascension: 14^{h} 15^{m} 56.70^{s}
- Declination: 23° 03′ 16.2″
- Distance: 6.8–7.8 Mly (2.1–2.4 Mpc)

Characteristics
- Type: dIrr
- Mass: (1.3±0.2)×10^{7} M_{☉}
- Size: 3300 ly

Other designations
- UGC 9128, DDO 187, PGC 50961

UGC 9128 is a dwarf irregular galaxy around 6.8–7.8 Mly (2.1–2.4 Mpc) away; it is thought to be in the Local Group, although its membership is not certain. The galaxy has a mass of about (1.3±0.2)×10^{7} M_{☉}, around 100 million stars, and a diameter of around 3300 ly. It is therefore quite faint, and so was only discovered in the 20th century.

UGC 9128 is around 2.7 Mly from GR 8, which is its nearest neighbour.

UGC 9128 is a starburst galaxy, with the peak of star formation being 20–100 million years ago. It is thought to have both a halo and disc.
