= Aquarius Dwarf =

Galaxy in the constellation Aquarius

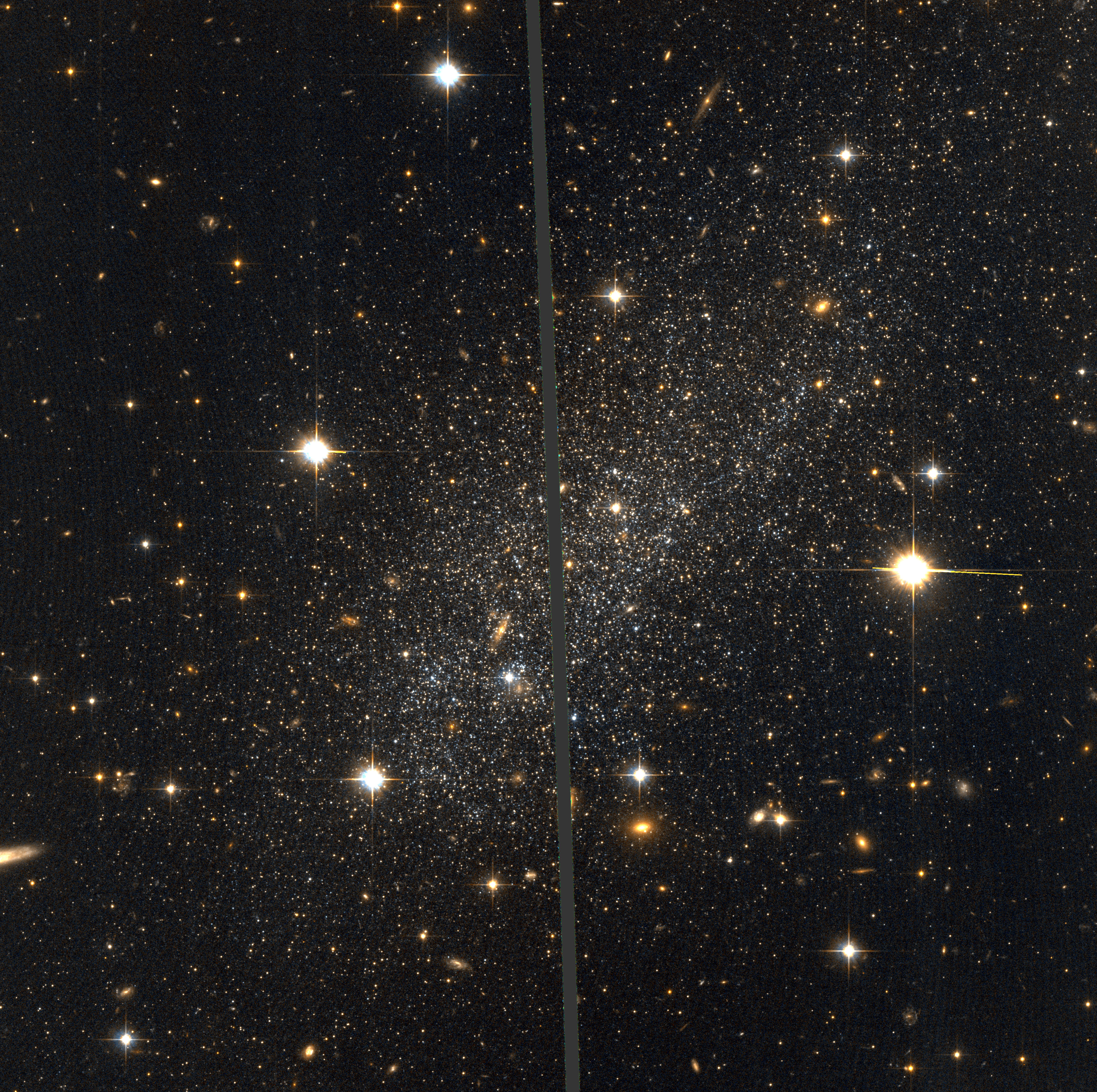
- Aquarius Dwarf by HST

Observation data (J2000 epoch)
- Constellation: Aquarius
- Right ascension: 20^{h} 46^{m} 51.8^{s}
- Declination: −12° 50′ 53″
- Redshift: -141 ± 2 km/s
- Distance: 3.2 ± 0.2 Mly (980 ± 50 kpc)
- Apparent magnitude (V): 14.0

Characteristics
- Type: IB(s)m
- Apparent size (V): 2.2′ × 1.1′
- Notable features: displays a blueshift

Other designations
- DDO 210, AqrDIG, PGC 65367

The Aquarius Dwarf is a dwarf irregular galaxy, first catalogued in 1959 by the DDO survey. It is located within the boundaries of the constellation of Aquarius. It is a member of the Local Group of galaxies, albeit an extremely isolated one; it is one of only a few known Local Group members for which a past close approach to the Milky Way or Andromeda Galaxy can be ruled out, based on its current location and velocity.

Local Group membership was firmly established only in 1999, with the derivation of a distance based on the tip of the red-giant branch method. Its distance from the Milky Way of 3.2 ±0.2 Mly (980 ±40 kpc) means that Aquarius Dwarf is quite isolated in space. It is one of the least luminous Local Group galaxies to contain significant amounts of neutral hydrogen and support to ongoing star formation, although it does so only at an extremely low level. Because of its large distance, the Hubble Space Telescope is required in order to study its stellar populations in detail. RR Lyrae stars have been discovered in Aquarius Dwarf, indicating the existence of stars more than 10 billion years old, but the majority of its stars are much younger (median age 6.8 billion years). Among Local Group galaxies, only Leo A has a younger mean age, leading to the suggestion that delayed star formation could be correlated with galaxy isolation.

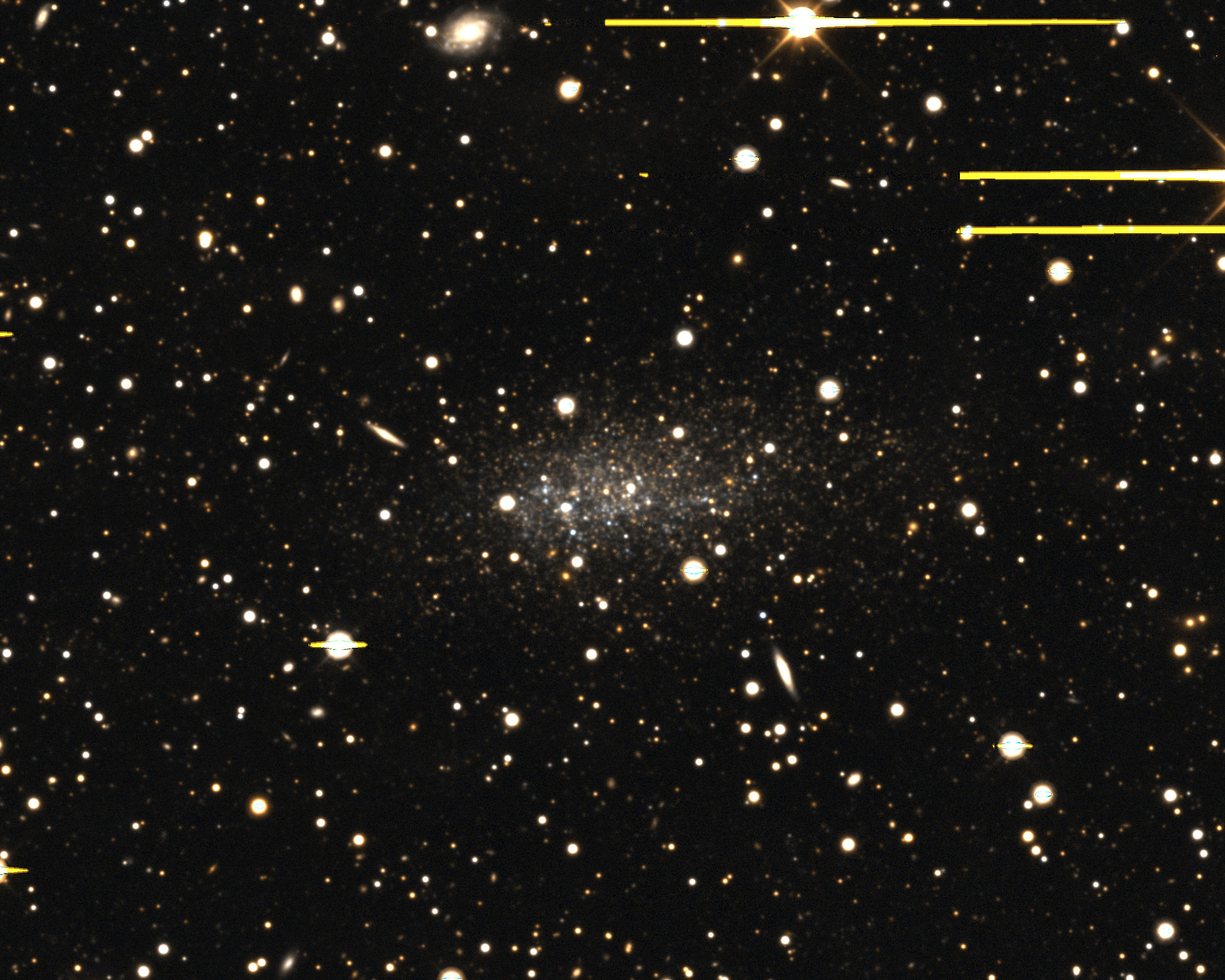
ground-based image with the legacy surveys
