= Antlia B =

Faint irregular dwarf galaxy in the local group

- NGC 3109 (which Antlia B is a satellite of) is located towards the far left

Observation data (J2000.0 epoch)
- Constellation: Antlia
- Right ascension: 09 48 56.1
- Declination: -25 59 24
- Group or cluster: NGC 3109 association

Characteristics
- Type: Dwarf irregular

Other designations
- Ant B

Antlia B (also known as Ant B) is a faint dwarf irregular satellite galaxy located around 72 kiloparsecs from NGC 3109, a small irregular galaxy located 4.3 million light years from Earth at the edge of the local group. Antlia B has a complex mixture of old red giant branch stars over 10 billion years old and young blue stars only a few hundred years old. Despite Antlia B being rich in gas, Antlia B shows no evidence of active star formation.

== Stellar population ==
The stellar population of Antlia B is composed of prominent old, metal-poor red giant branch stars with ages greater than 10 billion years and young blue stars somewhere between 200-400 million years old. Despite being rich in gas to form new stars, there seems to be no evidence for active star formation within Antlia B.

=== Stellar history ===
The history of star formation in Antlia B shows that there was relatively constant stellar mass growth for the first ~10-11 billion years of its history and then almost no growth for the last ~2-3 billion years.

== Discovery ==
The discovery of Antlia B was from the Dark Energy Camera survey (DES).
