= Leo P =

Dwarf irregular Galaxy in the constellation Leo

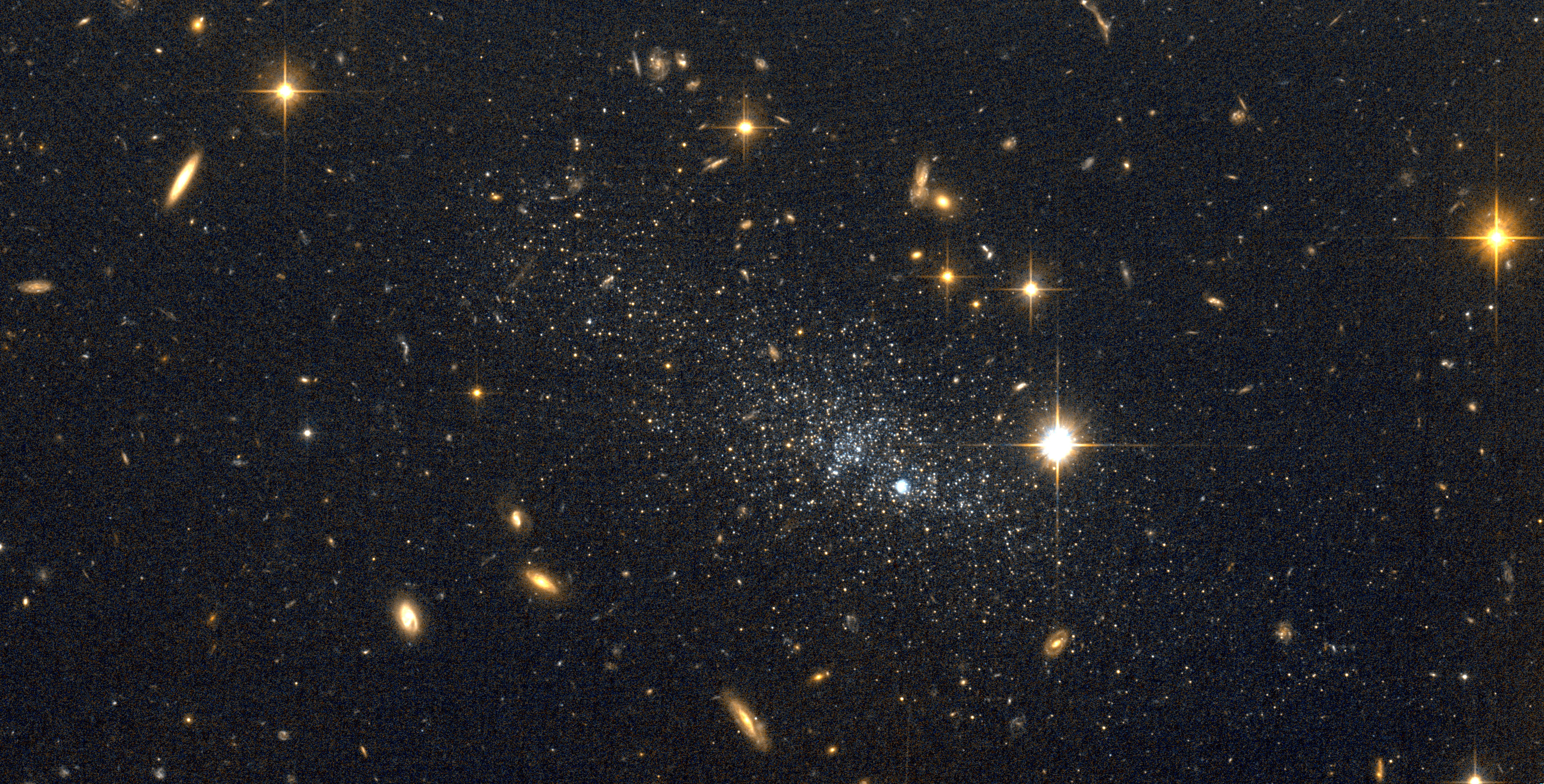
- Leo P by Hubble Space Telescope

Observation data (J2000 epoch)
- Constellation: Leo
- Right ascension: 10^{h} 21^{m} 45.123^{s}
- Declination: +18° 05′ 16.89″
- Distance: 5,284 kly (1,620 kpc)
- Group or cluster: Antlia Sextans Group
- Apparent magnitude (V): 16.89
- Absolute magnitude (V): −9.27

Characteristics
- Type: Irr
- Size: 1132 pc (3692.09 ly)
- Apparent size (V): 1.2′

Other designations
- Leo P, AGC 208583

Leo P is a small, star-forming irregular galaxy located in the constellation Leo, discovered through the blind HI Arecibo Legacy Fast ALFA (ALFALFA) survey, as an ultra-compact high-velocity cloud (UCHVC) of hydrogen gas. Its confirmation as a dwarf galaxy in 2013 suggests that other such UCHVCs are possibly undiscovered dwarf galaxies themselves. Leo P is noteworthy for harbouring one of the most metal-poor environments in the local universe. Its metallicity is just 3% that of the Sun's, meaning that its stars contain 30 times less heavy elements than the Sun. This makes Leo P similar to the pristine environments of primordial galaxies.

Leo P is located on the very outskirts of the Local Group, nearly 5.3 million light years away, and may not be part of it, instead being part of the Antlia-Sextans Group, a small grouping of galaxies adjacent to the Local Group, sometimes considered bound to it.

== Properties ==
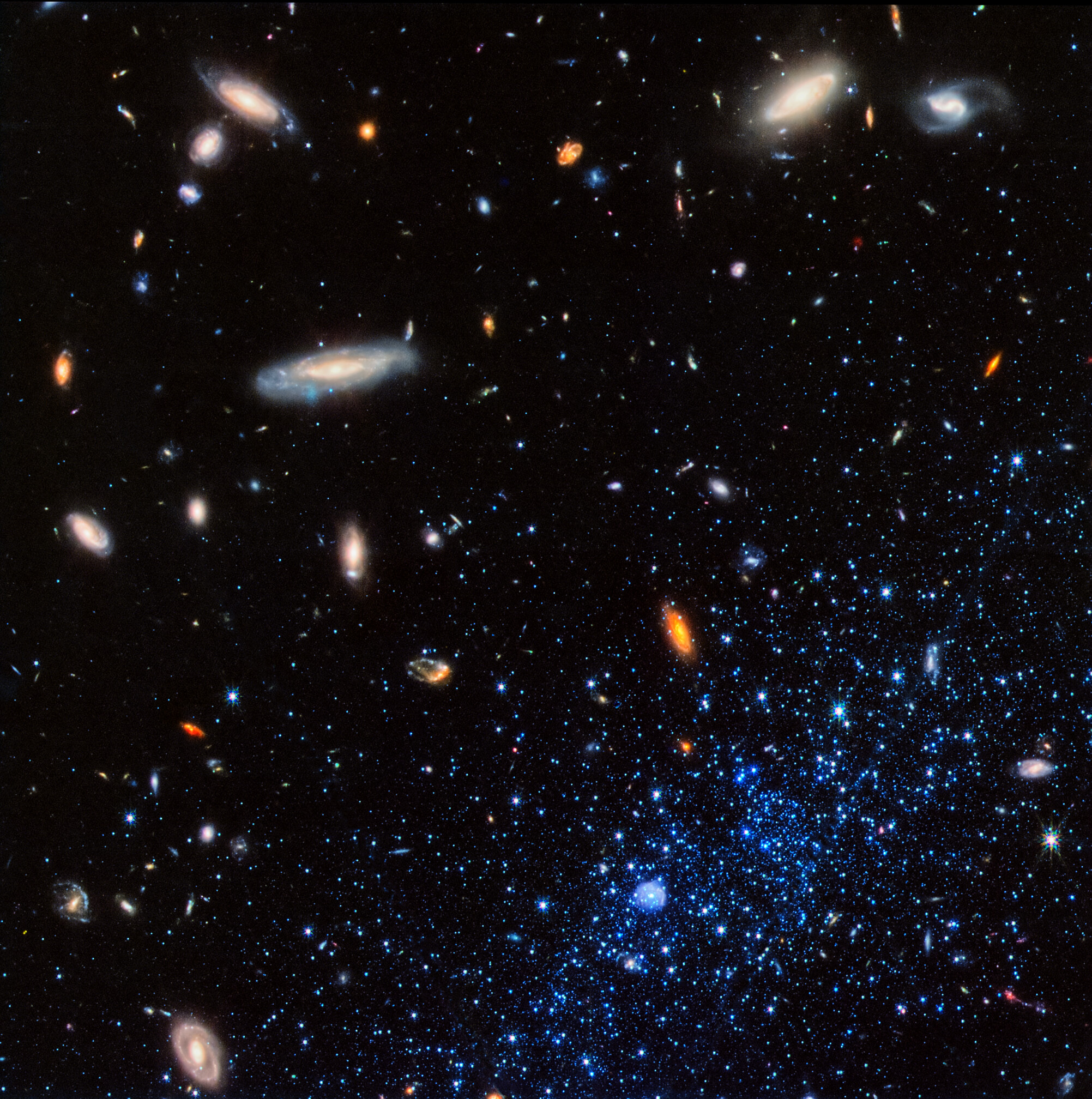
This James Webb Space Telescope image shows a portion of the Leo P dwarf galaxy.

Leo P is one of the smallest, least massive and faintest star-forming galaxies in the Local Group. Its total luminosity is less than 440,000 times that of the Sun (absolute magnitude of −9.27), and its stellar mass is only about 560,000 solar masses, implying a small stellar population. Leo P is also very rich in gas, containing about 810,000 solar masses of neutral hydrogen. Leo P's half-light radius is about 570 pc. Early attempts to detect molecular hydrogen in Leo P were unsuccessful. In 2025 James Webb Space Telescope discovered rotational emission lines of H_{2} in the mid-infrared part of the spectra leading to an estimate of the molecular hydrogen mass of the galaxy >10^{4} solar masses.

Leo P's stellar population consists of a strong concentration of massive, bright and blue stars in the centre of the galaxy, which may be B and A-type main sequence stars. Some fainter and redder stars are also observed, presumably red giants from an older stellar population. 10 RR Lyrae stars have been detected in the galaxy, as well as one H II region, which is ionised by LP26, an O-type star of 22 solar masses, the only one in Leo P.

=== Star formation ===
Leo P is one of the few Local Group galaxies which are currently forming stars. Its star formation rate is about 4.3×10^{−5} M_{☉} every year, or 1 solar mass every 20,400 years, and it is the Local Group's most metal-poor star-forming galaxy. Its star formation history shows mostly constant star formation throughout its lifetime, something which is also observed in larger irregular galaxies. Models also suggest that there was not much star formation post-reionisation, 12–8 billion years ago, and over the last 4 billion years, star formation has been happening at a constant rate.
