= NGC 3109 =

Galaxy in the constellation Hydra

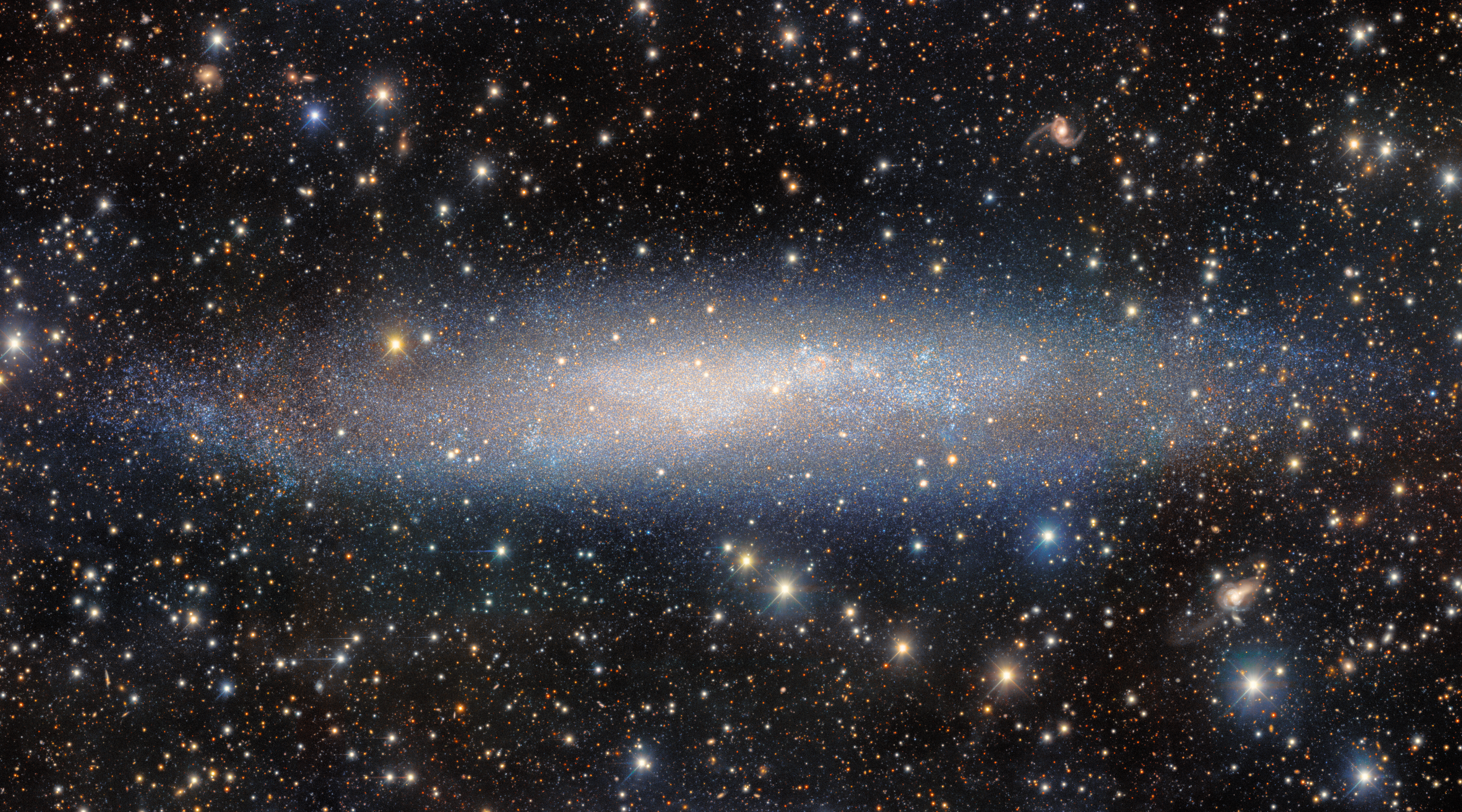
- NGC 3109 imaged by the Dark Energy Camera using the Víctor M. Blanco 4-meter Telescope

Observation data (J2000 epoch)
- Constellation: Hydra
- Right ascension: 10^{h} 03^{m} 06.88^{s}
- Declination: −26° 09′ 34.5″
- Redshift: 403 ± 1 km/s
- Distance: 1.333 ± 0.19 Mpc (4.348 ± 0.6197 Mly)
- Apparent magnitude (V): 10.4

Characteristics
- Type: SB(s)m
- Size: 41,700 ly × 8,770 ly (12.80 kpc × 2.69 kpc) (diameter; ESO D_{25.5} B-band isophote) (Note: The quoted diameters in this infobox was based on NED's provided scale of 0.0065 kpc/arcsec multiplied with the given angular diameters.); 3,946 ly × 3,946 ly (1.21 kpc × 1.21 kpc) (diameter; 2MASS K-band total isophote)
- Apparent size (V): 19.1′ × 3.7′

Other designations
- ESO 499- G 036, UGCA 194, MCG -04-24-013, PGC 29128

NGC 3109 is a small barred Magellanic type spiral or irregular galaxy around 4.35 Mly away in the constellation of Hydra. It was discovered by John Herschel on March 24, 1835 while he was in what is now South Africa.

== Size and morphology ==
NGC 3109 is classified as a Magellanic type irregular galaxy, but it may in fact be a small spiral galaxy. Based on the D_{25.5} isophote at the B-band with an angular diameter of 1,980 arcseconds, it has an isophotal diameter approximately 12.80 kiloparsecs (41,700 light-years) across, slightly larger than the Large Magellanic Cloud but smaller than the Triangulum Galaxy. If it is a spiral galaxy, it would be the smallest in the Local Group. NGC 3109 has a mass of about 2.3×10^{9} times the mass of the Sun (M_{☉}), of which 20% is in the form of neutral hydrogen. It is oriented edge-on from our point of view, and may contain a disk and a halo. The disk appears to be composed of stars of all ages, whereas the halo contains only very old and metal-poor stars. NGC 3109 does not appear to possess a galactic nucleus.

From measurements of the neutral atomic hydrogen in the galaxy, it has been found that the disk of NGC 3109 is warped. The warp has the same radial velocity as gas in the Antlia Dwarf galaxy, indicating that the two galaxies had a close encounter approximately one billion years ago.

== Composition ==
Based on spectroscopy of blue supergiants in NGC 3109, it is known that the galaxy has a low metallicity, similar to that of the Small Magellanic Cloud. It is one of the most metal-poor star-forming galaxies in the Local group. NGC 3109 seems to contain an unusually large number of planetary nebulae for its luminosity. It also contains a substantial amount of dark matter.

== Location ==
NGC 3109 is located about 1.33 megaparsecs (4.3 Mly) away, in the constellation Hydra. This puts it at the very outskirts of the Local Group. Its membership of the Local Group has been questioned, because it seems to be receding faster than estimates of the Local Group's escape velocity. It is distant enough from the largest members of the Local Group that it has not been tidally influenced by them.

NGC 3109 has two satellite galaxies, the Antlia Dwarf and Antlia B.

== Luminous blue variable ==
Although no supernovae have been observed in NGC 3109 yet, a luminous blue variable, designated AT 2018akx (type LBV, mag. 17.5), was discovered by the All Sky Automated Survey for SuperNovae on 22 March 2018.

== Gallery ==
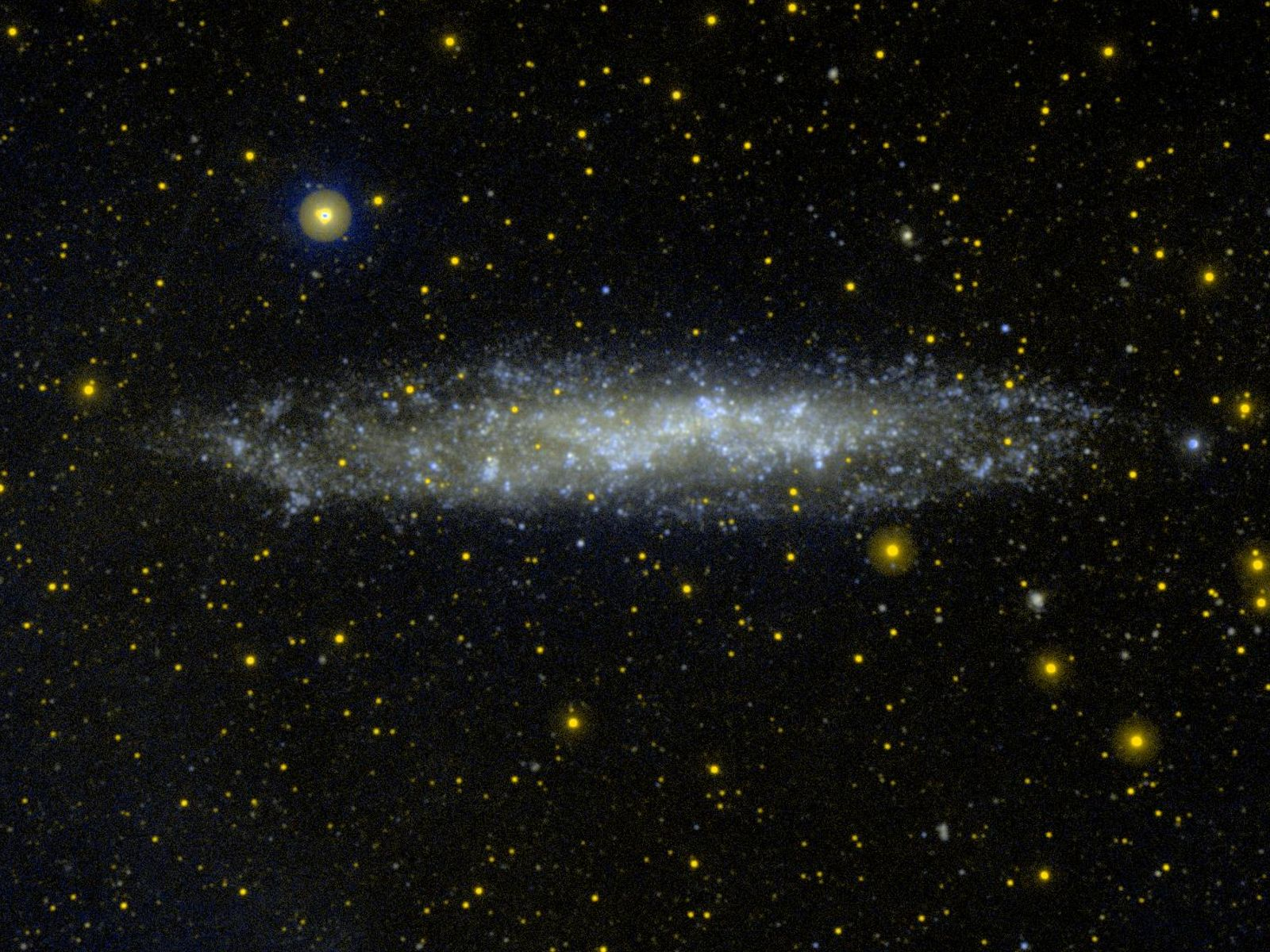
NGC 3109 imaged by GALEX (ultraviolet)

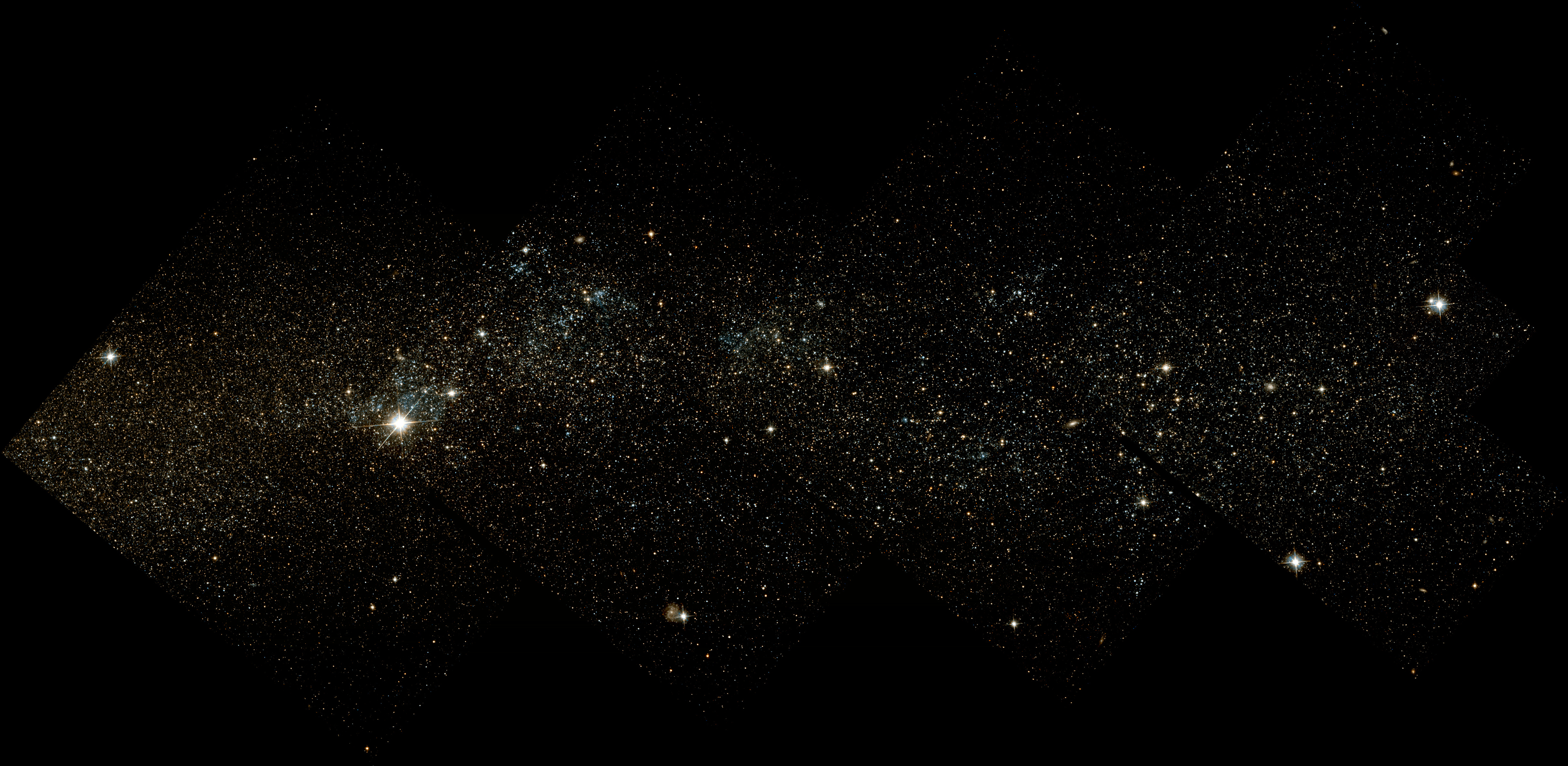
NGC 3109 with Hubble

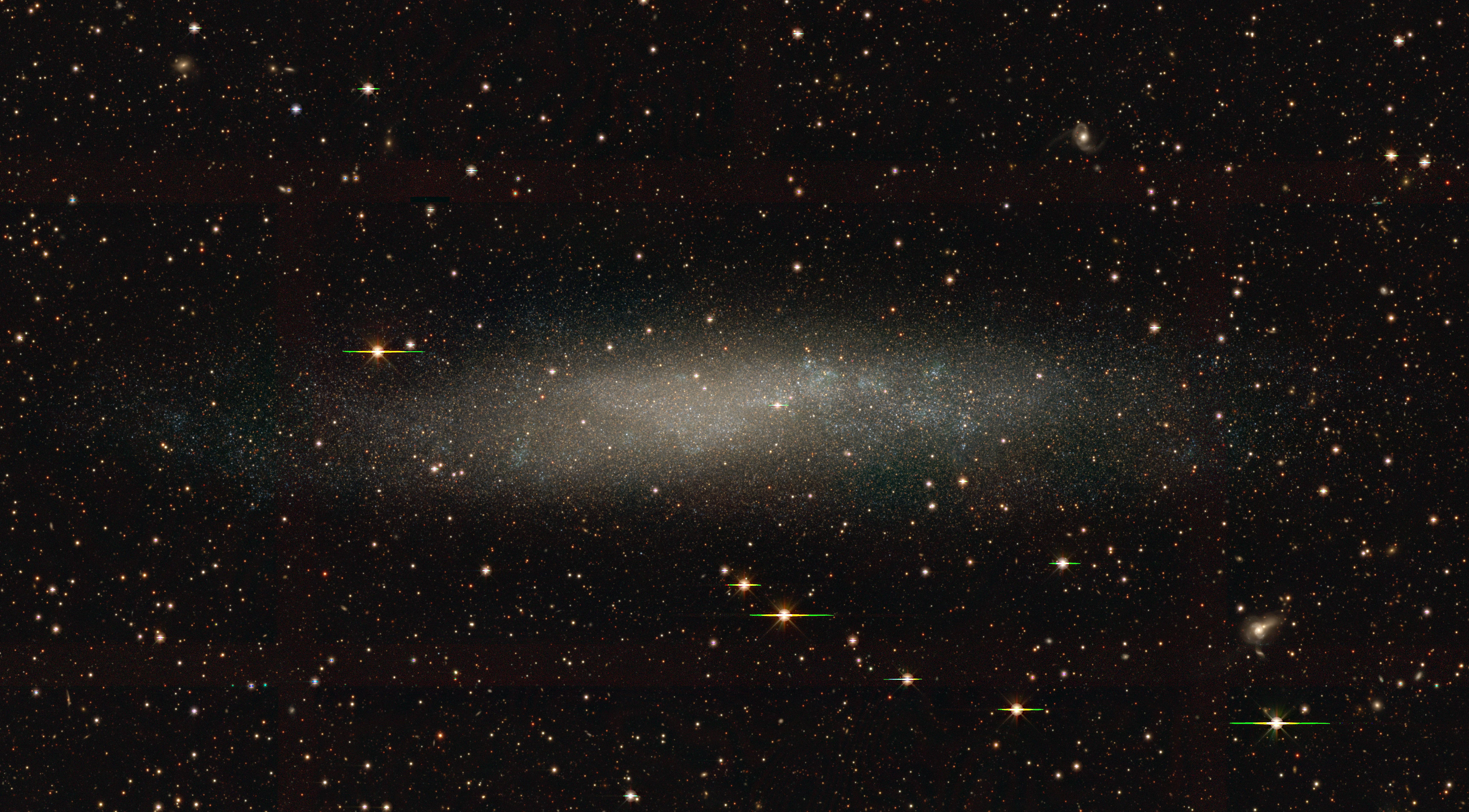
NGC 3109 with the legacy surveys

== See also ==
- List of NGC objects (3001–4000)
