= Sextans A =

Dwarf irregular galaxy in the constellation Sextans

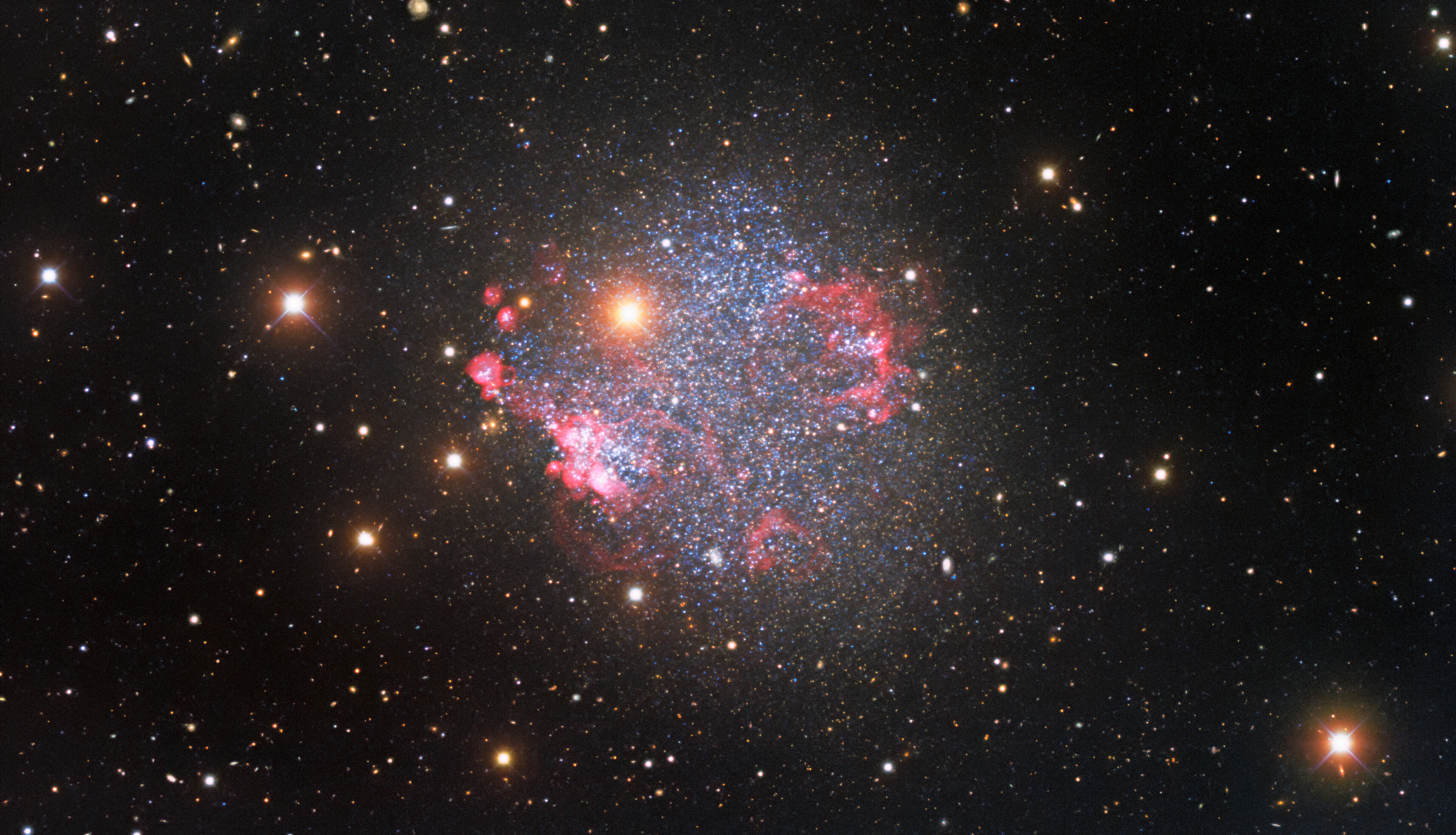
- Irregular galaxy Sextans A. The bright Milky Way foreground stars appear yellowish in this view. Beyond them lie the stars of Sextans A with young blue star clusters clearly visible.

Observation data (J2000 epoch)
- Constellation: Sextans
- Right ascension: 10^{h} 11^{m} 00.8^{s}
- Declination: −04° 41′ 34.2″
- Redshift: 0.001081±0.000002
- Heliocentric radial velocity: 324±1 km/s
- Distance: 4.59 ± 0.12 Mly (1.406 ± 0.038 Mpc)
- Apparent magnitude (V): 11.9

Characteristics
- Type: IBm
- Size: ~8,000 ly (2.45 kpc) (estimated)
- Apparent size (V): 5.9′ × 4.9′
- Notable features: Square in shape

Other designations
- DDO 75, IRAS F10085-0427, UGCA 205, MCG -01-26-030, PGC 29653

Sextans A (also known as UGCA 205) is a small dwarf irregular galaxy. It spans about 8000 light-years across, and is located at 4.6 million light-years away, in the outskirts of the Local Group of galaxies, which includes the Milky Way galaxy, and to which Sextans A may or may not belong.

Sextans A has a peculiar square shape. Massive short-lived stars exploded in supernovae that caused more star formation, triggering yet more supernovae, ultimately resulting in an expanding shell. Young blue stars now highlight areas and shell edges high in current star formation, which from the perspective of observers on Earth appears roughly square. The 10.4 m telescope Gran Telescopio Canarias recently observed the OB-type stars that power the giant HII regions.

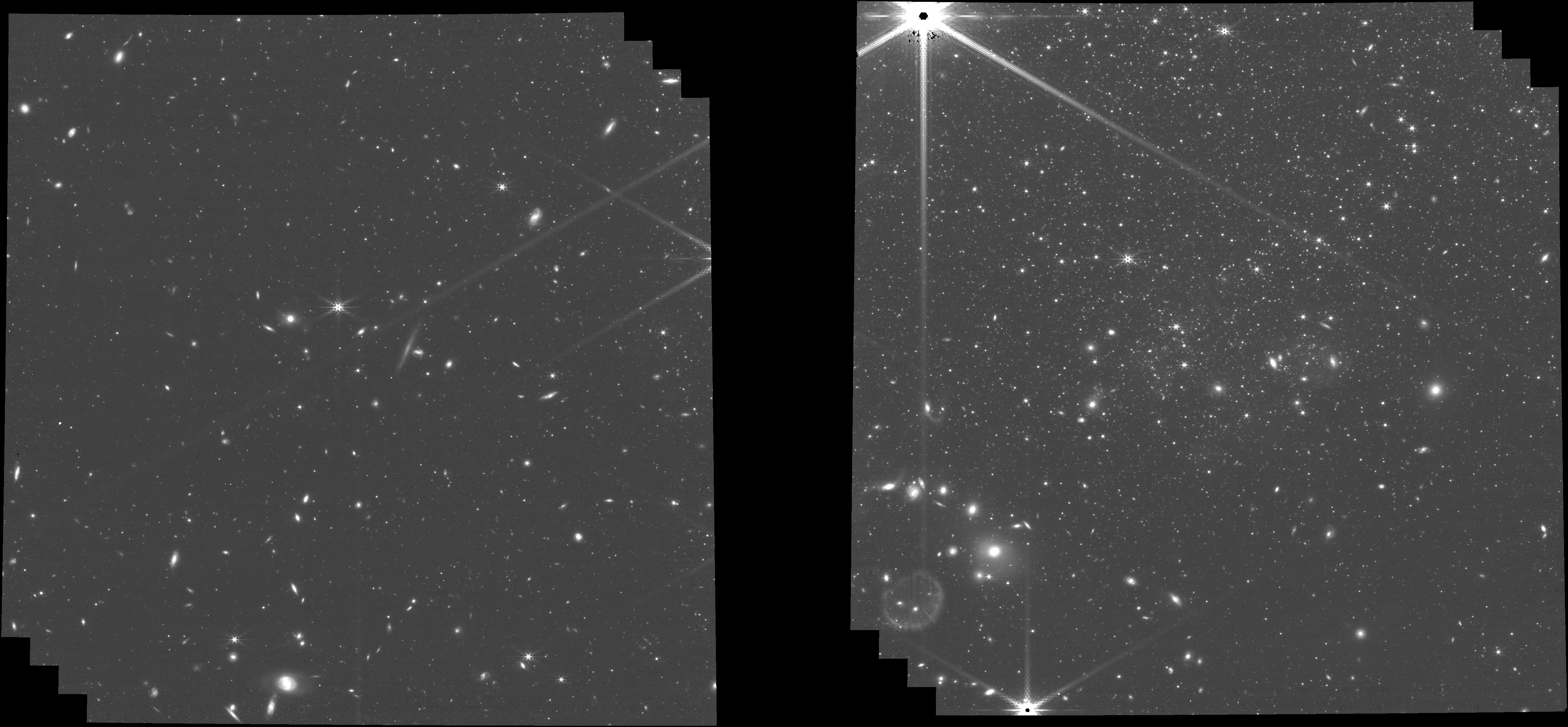
James Webb image of the galaxy

== See also ==
- Sextans B
