= 5010 =

5010 may refer to:

- A.D. 5010, a year in the 6th millennium CE
- 5010 BCE, a year in the 6th millennium BC
- 5010, a number in the 5000 (number) range
- NGC 5010, an elliptical galaxy
- 5010 Amenemhêt, a main-belt asteroid
- Hawaii Route 5010, a state highway
- 5010th Air Base Wing, a United States military unit
- IBM System/7, formerly designated the IBM 5010
- Nine ANSI ASC X12 005010 EDI transaction sets mandated by HIPAA for medical transactions, under the auspices of the United States Centers for Medicare and Medicaid Services
