= Shobita Satyapal =

American astrophysicist

Shobita Satyapal is an American astrophysicist who studies supermassive black holes, intermediate-mass black holes, and their effects on galaxy formation and evolution. Her research has shown that dwarf galaxies and galaxies lacking a thick galactic bulge contain black holes that are larger than were expected, and combined data from multiple telescopes to find pairs of supermassive black holes approaching a collision. She is a professor in the Physics & Astronomy Department at George Mason University.

== Education and career ==
Satyapal is a 1988 magna cum laude graduate of Bryn Mawr College, where she majored in physics. She went to the University of Rochester for graduate study in physics and astronomy, receiving a master's degree in 1990 and completing her Ph.D. in 1995. Her doctoral dissertation, Probing the dust enshrouded nuclei of the starburst galaxy systems M82 and Arp 299: High spatial resolution near-infrared Fabry–Pérot imaging observations, concerned Fabry–Pérot interferometry of Messier 82 and Arp 299, and was supervised by Dan M. Watson.

She became a postdoctoral researcher at the National Air and Space Museum from 1995 to 1996, NASA Goddard Space Flight Center from 1996 to 1999, Maria Mitchell Observatory in 1997 and 1998, and Space Telescope Science Institute from 1999 to 2001. While at the Space Telescope Science Institute, she also held an adjunct position at George Mason University, and she joined George Mason as an assistant professor in 2001, earning tenure there in 2006.

== Book ==
Satyapal is a coauthor of the book Supermassive: Black Holes at the Beginning and End of the Universe (with James Trefil, Smithsonian Books, 2025).

== Recognition ==
Satyapal was a 1998 recipient of the Presidential Early Career Award for Scientists and Engineers.
