= IRAS 01003−2238 =

Galaxy in the constellation Cetus

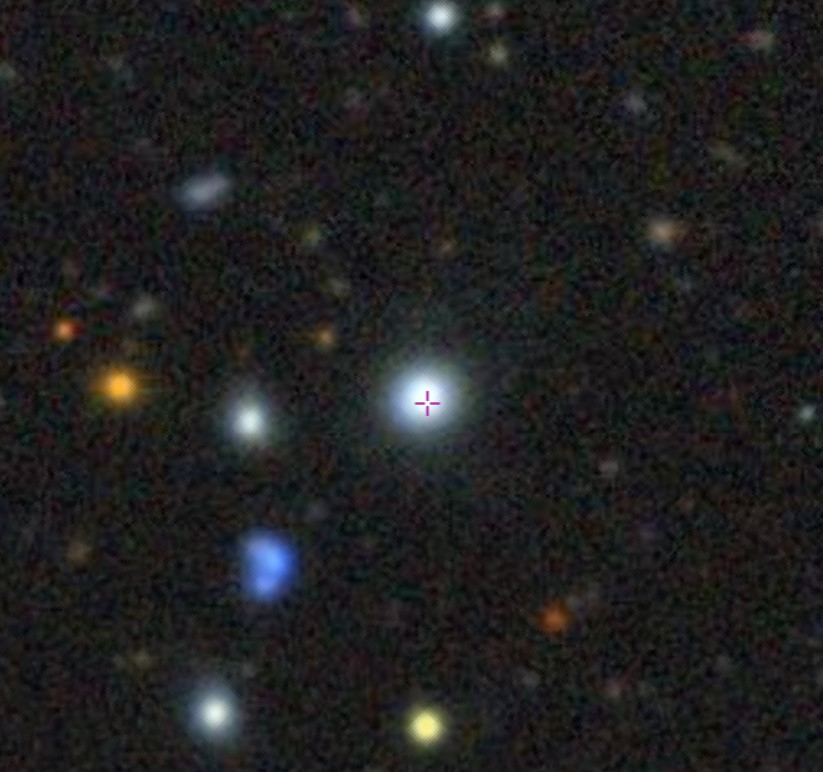
- IRAS 01003−2238 captured with DESI Legacy Surveys

Observation data (J2000.0 epoch)
- Constellation: Cetus
- Right ascension: 01^{h} 02^{m} 49.99^{s}
- Declination: −22° 21′ 57.25″
- Redshift: 0.117968
- Heliocentric radial velocity: 35,366 km/s
- Distance: 1.657 Gly (508.03 Mpc)
- Apparent magnitude (B): 18.62
- Absolute magnitude (V): 18.9

Characteristics
- Type: HII;Sbrst; Sy 2, ULIRG
- Notable features: Luminous infrared galaxy, Wolf-Rayet galaxy

Other designations
- IRAS F01004−2237, LEDA 3095492, NVSS J010249, 222156, F01004−2237

IRAS 01003−2238 also known as IRAS F01004−2237 or simply F01004−2237, is a galaxy located in the constellation of Cetus. It is located 1.65 billion light years away from Earth and is a Seyfert galaxy and an ultraluminous infrared galaxy. IRAS 01003−2238 is also classified as a Wolf-Rayet galaxy, making the object one of the most distant known.

== Characteristics ==
IRAS 01003−2238 is the brightest galaxy of a small group. It has two companions located 14.5 arcsec east and 18.5 arcsec southeast respectively. It has an infrared luminosity of 10^{12.2} L_{☉}, and a far-infrared luminosity of 1.9 × 10^{12} L_{☉}. The black hole mass in IRAS 01003−2238 is estimated to be 2.5 × 10^{7} M_{☉}.

IRAS 01003−2228 has a star formation rate of > 100 M_{☉} yr^{−1}. There are also numerous massive young Wolf-Rayet stars in its nucleus. In addition, the galaxy displays a broad emission band with a rest wavelength of λ ≈ 4660 Á. This is interpreted as arising from a combined effect of around 10^{5} Wolf-Rayet stars of a WN subtype.

Additionally, IRAS 01003−2238 is also an old galaxy merger showing modest distortions but absence of tidal tails when shown at optical wavelengths. Although no traces of radio excess are seen, it is categorized as a Seyfert 2 galaxy according to optical observations. It shows signs of a hidden active galactic nucleus. The radio emission in IRAS 01003−2238 is found similar to radio galaxies with a high intrinsic brightness temperature of T'_{b} ~ 10^{8.1} K.

An optical flare is observed in IRAS 01003−228, with a luminous one recorded in June 2010. Since both helium emission lines are detected in the galaxy following the optical flare, the most likely explanation is a candidate tidal disruption event, where a star wandering close to the black hole is ripped apart by tidal forces. Since then, IRAS 01003−2238 has since gone through another recurring flaring period in September 2021. This time, the flare is ultraviolet bright yet weak in X-rays.
