= IRAS 14026+4341 =

Seyfert 1 galaxy located in the constellation Canes Venatici

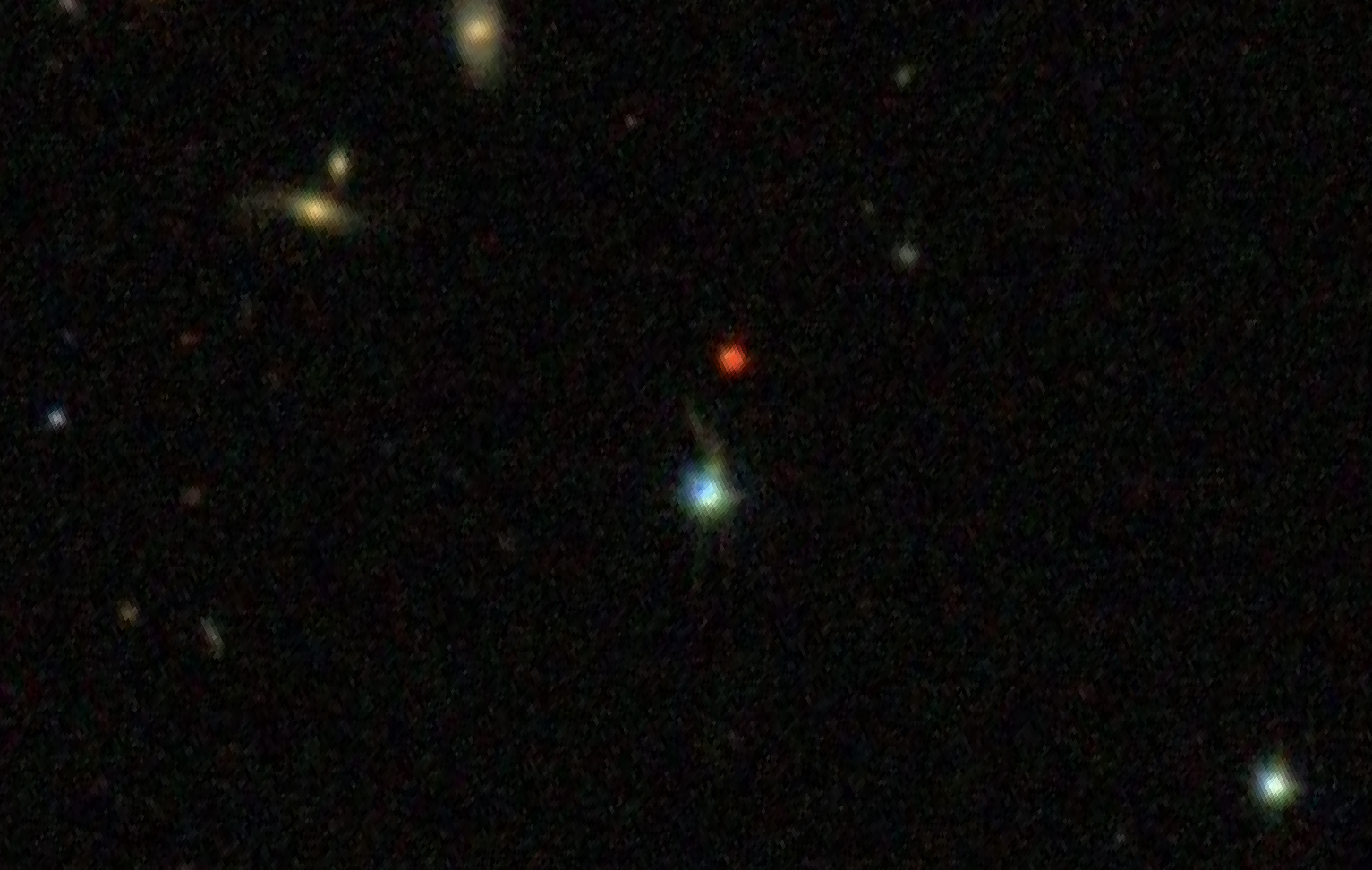
- SDSS image of IRAS 14026+4341.

Observation data (J2000.0 epoch)
- Constellation: Canes Venatici
- Right ascension: 14^{h} 04^{m} 38.80^{s}
- Declination: +43° 27′ 07.51″
- Redshift: 0.322894
- Heliocentric radial velocity: 96,801 km/s
- Distance: 3.740 Gly
- Apparent magnitude (V): 15.76
- Apparent magnitude (B): 16.12

Characteristics
- Type: BAL;Sy1 HyLIRG
- Size: ~357,000 ly (109.47 kpc) (estimated)
- Notable features: Luminous infrared galaxy, broad absorption-line quasar

Other designations
- CSO 409, LEDA 84105, PB 1309, FBS 332, 2MASS J14043881+4327072, SDSS J140438.80+432707.4, FBS 1402+436, LAMOST J140438.80+432707.52, CXO J140438.8+432707

IRAS 14026+4341 is a Seyfert type 1 galaxy located in the constellation of Canes Venatici. The redshift of the object is (z) 0.322 and it was first discovered as an infrared source from the Infra Red Astronomical Satellite (IRAS) catalogue in 1987 and later identified as a quasar in 1988. This object is classified as a hyperluminous infrared galaxy due to its extreme luminosity and also a broad absorption-line quasar.

== Description ==
IRAS 14026+4341 is classified as a radio-quiet quasar and a Type 1 AGN. The host is a bright medium-sized elliptical galaxy described as bulge-dominated, round and featureless by Hubble Space Telescope (HST) imaging. The star formation rate is estimated to be 400 ± 300 M_{☉} per year with its AGN and starburst bolometric luminosity estimated as 13.12 and 12.19 L_{☉}.

IRAS 14026+4341 is merging with a small companion galaxy which appears in the process of being obliterated by tidal forces. According to imaging by both HST and optical imaging, it has a long and curved tidal tail, with an extension of more than seven arcseconds. The structure of the tidal tail imaged with HST is found to have an elongated head towards the radius vector, with a bright knot feature having a luminosity of -18. The outer end of the tail is much brighter and sharply bounded, becoming wider as the distance from the nucleus increases. There are two compact faint knots superimposed on both sides of the galaxy. The nucleus itself is depicted as reddened and luminous.

IRAS 14026+4341 is described as a weak emission-line quasar with heavy dust reddening. Based on observations, the broadband spectral energy distribution of the object is found to display a curve in wavelength ranges between the units of 1,200 Å and 10,000 Å and is characterized by steep increases at short wavelengths lower than 3,000 Å. However it does not have any signs of significant reddening at much longer wavelengths.

The object is highly polarized based on ultraviolet and optical spectropolarimetry. According to observations, its flux spectrum is extremely steep with presence of both oxidated iron emission and Balmer lines in polarized light. There is also evidence of lowly polarized doubly ionized oxygen lines indicating dust scattering grains are either located within or mixed together with narrow-line gas. X-ray variability was also detected for the first time in 2012.
