= IRAS 15206+3342 =

Galaxy in the constellation of Boötes

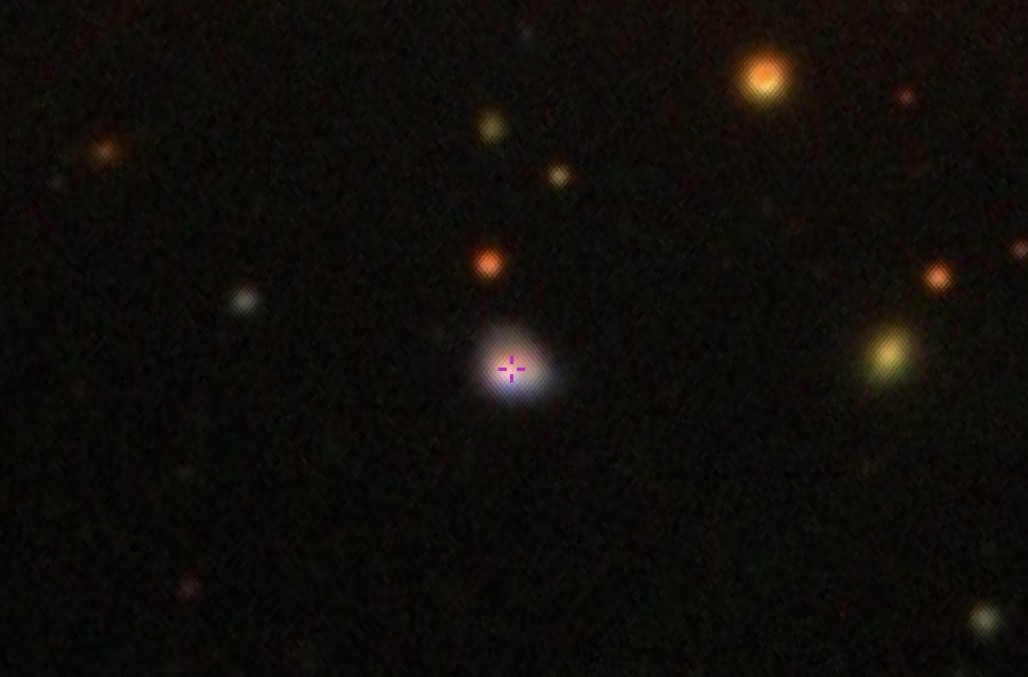
- IRAS 15206+3342 by SDSS.

Observation data (J2000.0 epoch)
- Constellation: Boötes
- Right ascension: 15^{h} 22^{m} 38.0853^{s}
- Declination: +33° 31′ 36.078″
- Redshift: 0.125295
- Heliocentric radial velocity: 37,563 km/s
- Distance: 1.892 Gly (580 Mpc)
- Apparent magnitude (B): 16.80

Characteristics
- Type: Hii; ULIRG; WR?, Sy2
- Size: ~109,300 ly (33.50 kpc) (estimated)
- Notable features: Luminous infrared galaxy

Other designations
- AKARI J1522382+333135, LEDA 84586, NVSS J152237+333134, IDEOS 04982784_00, [BKD2008] WR 291

IRAS 15206+3342 is a galaxy merger located in the constellation of Boötes. Its redshift is (z) 0.125 meaning the object is 1.9 billion light-years from Earth. It is classified as an ultraluminous infrared galaxy and also a Seyfert type 2 galaxy, known to have a distorted disk morphology.

== Description ==
IRAS 15206+3342 is classified as a warm ultraluminous infrared galaxy. The total infrared luminosity of this galaxy is 1.86×10^{12} L_{☉} (Note: Given as log(L_{IR}/L_{☉}) = 12.27.) and it displays a H II-type optical spectrum. It is an end-stage compact merger product, resulting from two low-luminosity disk galaxies colliding with each other. It has a single nucleus and a bent tidal tail found to measure approximately 13 kiloparsecs (kpc). The outer part of the tail is found linking with a resolved stellar system, 20 kiloparsecs from it while its inner parts are of low-surface brightness with luminosities of between 21.5 and 22.0 magnitude. The galaxy shows starbursts at a rate of at least 150 M_{☉} per year which in turn contributes half of the total bolometric luminosity.

Imaging by Hubble Space Telescope (HST) showed the object also has many chains of blue compact star-forming region knots within its inner regions, shown arranged in an arc-shape. Four of these knots are found to be extremely luminous while the others are of low luminosities. The stellar populations of the galaxy are mainly very young, ranging from less than 3 to 10 million years old.Most of the radio emission originates within its nucleus in the southern half of the primary star-forming knots according to ground-based imaging.

High resolution ultraviolet and optical spectroscopy via an imaging spectrograph, showed the galaxy has three identified compact luminous knots. Based on observations, the first knot is found to be the brightest, with its ultraviolet spectrum displaying absorption line features while the other two are mainly H II regions.
