= ESO 148-2 =

Galaxy in the constellation Tucana

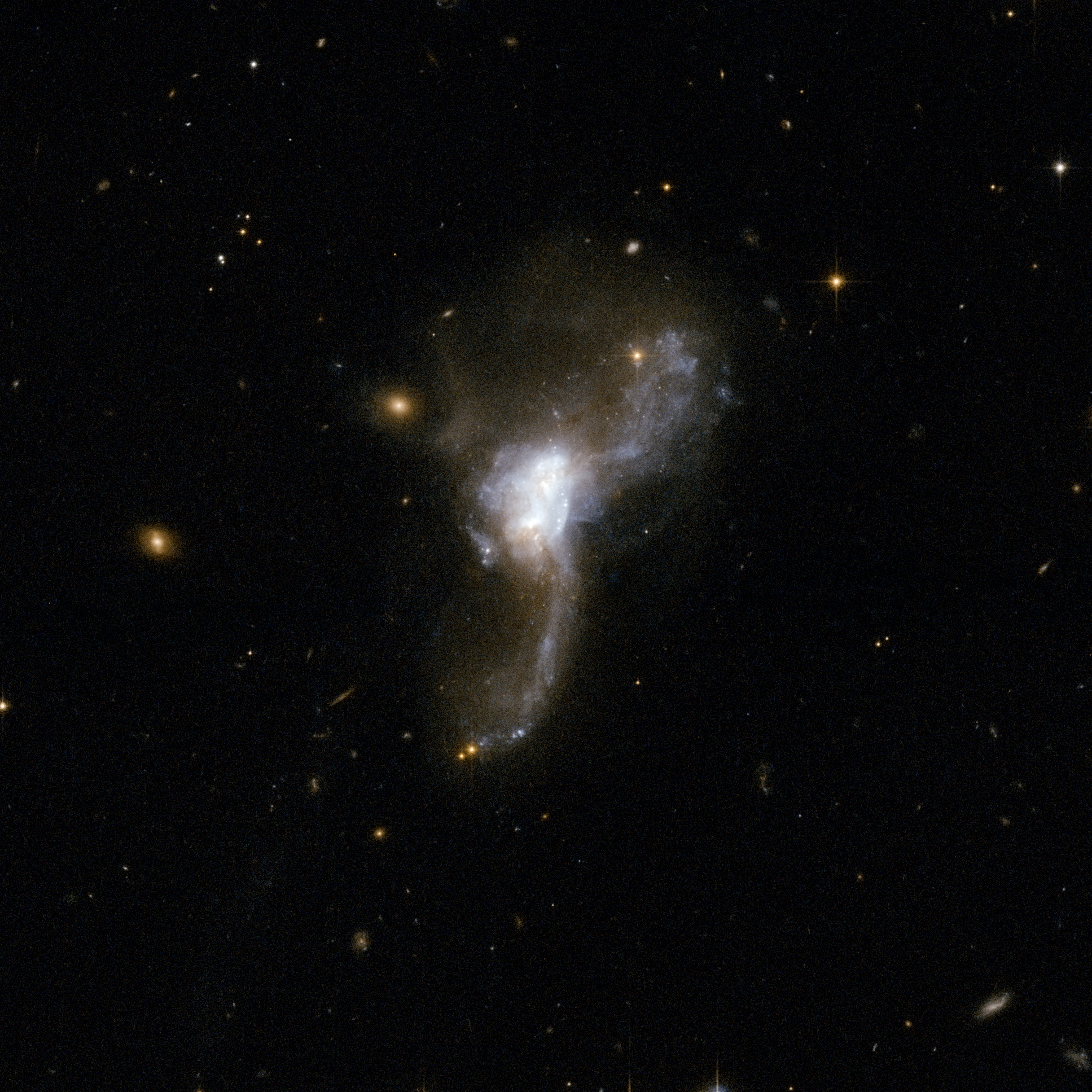
- Hubble image of ESO 148-2.

Observation data (J2000 epoch)
- Constellation: Tucana
- Right ascension: 23^{h} 15^{m} 46.76^{s}
- Declination: −59° 03′ 15.69″
- Redshift: 0.044601
- Heliocentric radial velocity: 13,371 km/s
- Distance: 642 Mly (196.83 Mpc)
- Apparent magnitude (V): 14.73
- Apparent magnitude (B): 14.94

Characteristics
- Type: Merger;HII; Sy2 Sbrst
- Apparent size (V): 0.9' x 0.7'
- Notable features: Luminous infrared galaxy

Other designations
- ESO 148-IG002, PGC 70861, AM 2312-591, IRAS 23128-5919, IRAS F23128-5919

ESO 148-2 known as ESO 148-IG002 and IRAS 23128-5919, is a galaxy merger located in the constellation of Tucana. It is located 642 million light years from Earth and is classified a Wolf-Rayet galaxy as well as an ultraluminous infrared galaxy.

== Characteristics ==
A late-stage merger involving two colliding disk galaxies, ESO 148-2 has a distorted main body structure that is similar to the Antennae galaxies. Its appearance takes a form of an owl taking flight with curved large tidal tails representing as wings, made from both stars and gas. The black hole in ESO 148-2 has an estimated mass of 4.4 × 10^{7} M_{☉}.

ESO 148-2 is also a bright galaxy with a star formation rate of 149 M_{☉} yr^{−1} and an infrared luminosity of L_{FIR} =10^{11.71} L_{☉}. This infrared luminosity is interpreted as radiation emitting from dust emissions via intense heating of its star formation regions. In the regions of the galaxy, there are type N Wolf-Rayet stars emitting N III λ4641 and He II λ4686 emission, making them the brightest subtype. The H II regions of ESO 148-2 are dominated by star formation with an estimated metallicity rate of 9.09 ± 0.03. Furthermore it has a point-like source, with both of the thermal and de-absorbed power law components in its spectrum having a luminosity of ~ 1.5 × 10^{41} and ~ 2.7 × 10^{42} erg s^{−1} respectively.

ESO 148-2 has two nuclei with a projected separation of ~ 4.5 arcsec. The nuclei in ESO 148-2 are found close to each other. Each of them have different properties. The northern nucleus contains a velocity dispersion value agreeing with star formation and emission line ratios in alignment of both LINERS and H II regions. The southern nucleus on the other hand, is three times more luminous at 24 μm and harbors an active galactic nucleus detected by both infrared and X-rays with an absorption-corrected luminosity of log_{L2-10} = 42.38^{+0.24}_{-0.28}. In the supermassive black hole of the southern nucleus, new stars are born through powerful galactic outflows.

According to Johnson UBVJHKL and spectroscopy photometry, as well as CCD-imaging, the central region of ESO 148-2 exhibits firm emission lines with a full width at half maximum of 600 kilometers per seconds (km/s). These emission lines are found blueshifted by 320 km/s to the absorption spectrum.
