= IRAS 07598+6508 =

Quasar in the constellation Camelopardalis

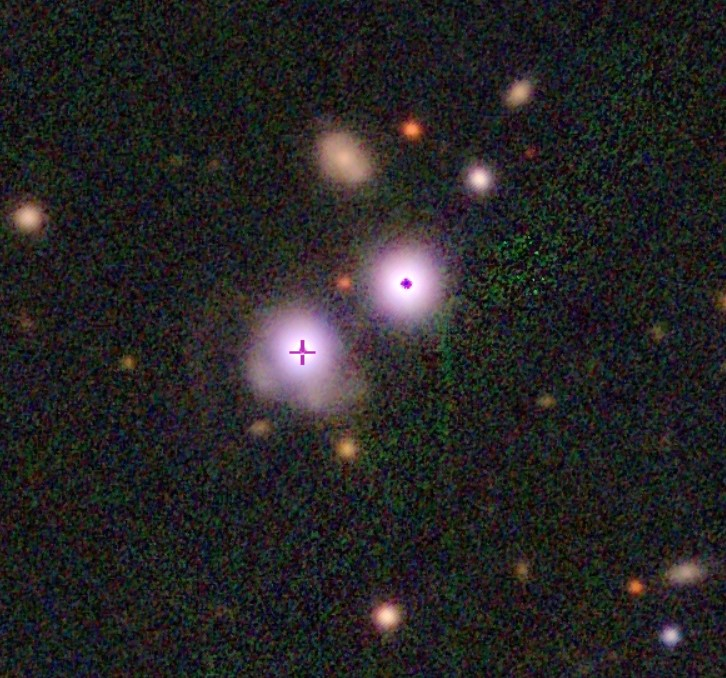
- IRAS 07598+6508 taken with Pan-STARRS

Observation data (J2000.0 epoch)
- Constellation: Camelopardalis
- Right ascension: 08^{h} 04^{m} 30.46^{s}
- Declination: +64° 59′ 52.87″
- Redshift: 0.148839
- Heliocentric radial velocity: 44,621 km/s
- Distance: 2.377 Mly (726.64 Mpc)
- Apparent magnitude (V): 15.5
- Apparent magnitude (B): 14.3

Characteristics
- Type: BALQSO, Sy1
- Notable features: Luminous infrared galaxy, galaxy merger

Other designations
- LEDA 97524, IRAS F07599+6508, BIG 222b, 2XMM J080430.4+645951

IRAS 07598+6508 known as IRAS F07599+6508, is a quasar located in the constellation of Camelopardalis. It is located 2.37 billion light years from Earth and is classified as both an ultraluminous infrared galaxy and a Seyfert galaxy.

== Characteristics ==
IRAS 07598+6508 is categorized an advanced galaxy merger. It shows several tidal features according to ground-based optical images. A patchy emission is found having a low-surface brightness of around 22 R magnitude arcsec^{−2}, based on Hubble Space Telescope (HST) imaging on the host galaxy. This emission is suggestive of tidal debris created by a recent galaxy-to-galaxy interaction. A deep R-band image reveals the presence of an extended tidal tail from north to east direction. It has a dynamical age of ~ 160 Myr and is curving towards south of the nucleus by ~ 50 kiloparsecs (kpc). Since one tidal tail is clearly seen, the merger was probably caused from the interaction of a spiral and elliptical galaxy.

In addition, IRAS 07598+6508 has several star clusters located both west and south, based on a HST optical image. The galaxy is infrared bright with a source having an estimated luminosity of L_{2-10keV} = 1.12 × 10^{42} erg s^{−1}.

IRAS 07598+6508 is a low-redshift broad absorption line quasar according to Sebastian Lipari and by ROSAT. It shows abnormally large blueshifts by 3000 km s^{−1} to a Balmer line as well as sodium (Na I) λ5892 at emission peaks. When looking at both Hα and Hβ intensity ratios, a broad emission line in IRAS 07598+6508 is found reddening by E(B-V) ~ 0.45 with a reddening of a spectral energy distribution of E(B-V) ~ 0.12.

IRAS 07598+6508 is also known to be a strong ferrous (Fe II) emitter although X-ray quiet with a value of α_{ox} = 2.45. It has a spectrum being influenced by its tapered broad line region with a full width at half maximum measurement of 1780 km s^{−1}. Besides iron, IRAS 07598+6508 emits spectral lines of titanium (Ti II) and chromium (Cr II). Given its strong Fe II emission, the emission likely derived from a superbubble or was caused by ejected material from a type II supernovae.

Optical HST imaging found two emission clumps, located ~ 7" southeast and south from IRAS 07598+6508. This presence of clumps indicates the emission originates from OB associations and is the key to signs of recent star formation in the galaxy. A NICMOS image of IRAS 07598+6508, finds electromagnetic radiation is controlled by a source of light from the nucleus although low-level emission is also visible right up to ~ 2" radius.
