= South America (disambiguation) =

South America is a continent forming the southern part of the Americas.

South America may also refer to:

- South America, the official name of the 29th season of the animated series South Park
- USS South America, a 1861 whaler
- South America Galaxy
- South America, a 1913 book by William Henry Koebel
- "South America", a song by the band Shout Out Louds from the album Our Ill Wills, 2007
