= ESO 420-G013 =

Galaxy in the constellation Sculptor

ESO 420-G 013
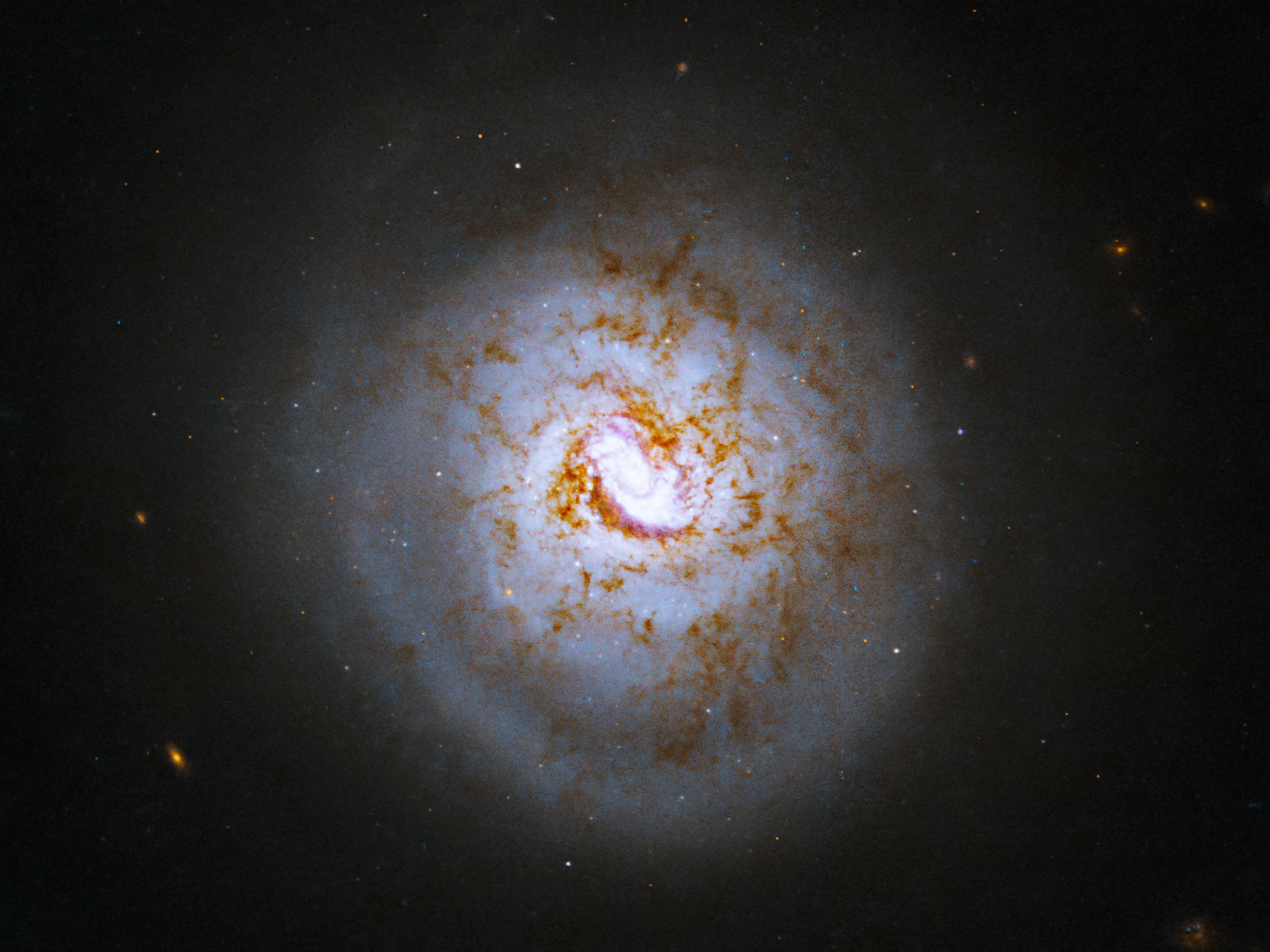
- ESO 420-G 013 imaged by the Hubble Space Telescope.

Observation data (J2000 epoch)
- Constellation: Sculptor
- Right ascension: 04h 13m 50.40s
- Declination: +32° 00m 22.00s
- Redshift: 0.012080
- Distance: 50 Mly
- Apparent magnitude (V): 13.3
- Apparent magnitude (B): 13.31

Characteristics
- Type: G

Other designations
- ESO 420-G 013, GLEAM J041349-320017, NVSS J041349-320025, AM 0411-320, APMBGC 420+013+110, LEDA 14702, 2MASX J04134969-3200252, MCG-05-11-006, WISEA J041349.68-320025.1

ESO 420-G 013 is a spiral galaxy located 50 million light years away in the constellation Sculptor. It is classified to be a Seyfert galaxy and is often nicknamed the Baseball Galaxy.The redshift of this galaxy is (Z) 0.012080.

The galaxy contains a luminous purple core, which outshines the nearly round disk and dust filaments surrounding it. The object was captured by the Hubble Space Telescope as part of a study targeting luminous infrared galaxies (LIRGs).
