= IRAS F17179+5444 =

Seyfert type 2 galaxy in the constellation Draco

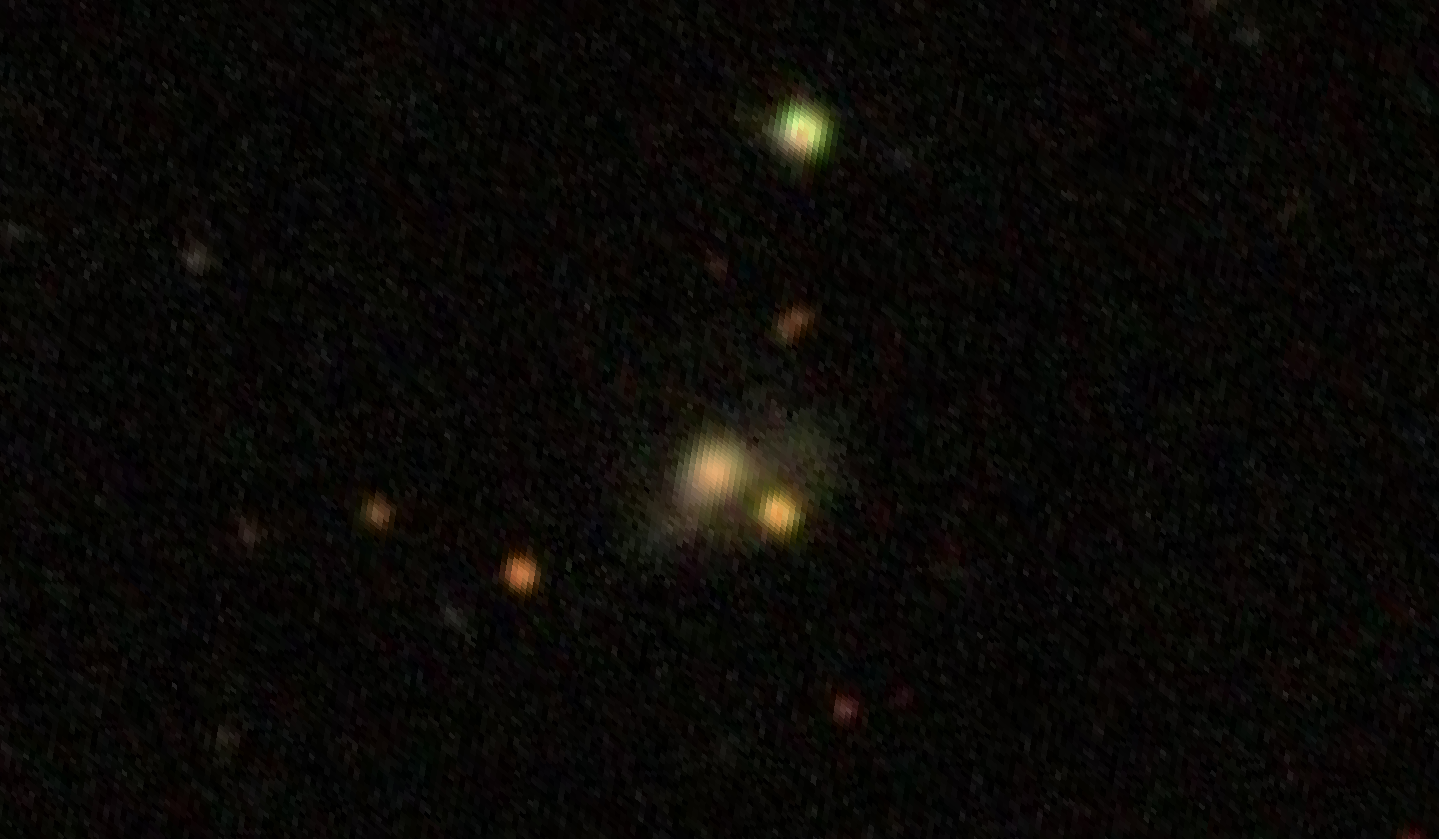
- SDSS image of IRAS F17179+5444.

Observation data (J2000.0 epoch)
- Constellation: Draco
- Right ascension: 17^{h} 18^{m} 54.38^{s}
- Declination: +54° 41′ 48.32″
- Redshift: 0.147680
- Heliocentric radial velocity: 44,273 km/s
- Distance: 1.927 Gly

Characteristics
- Type: ULIRG Sy2
- Size: ~214,900 ly (65.89 kpc) (estimated)

Other designations
- 2MASX J17185436+5441486, IRAS 17179+5444, LEDA 165729, TXS 1717+547, CORALZ J171854+544148, SDSS J171854.39+544148.4

IRAS F17179+5444 is a Seyfert type 2 galaxy located in the constellation of Draco. The redshift of the object is (z) 0.147 and it was first discovered by astronomers in 1994 from the QDOT survey, designated as QDOT 171754.3+544450. It is classified as an ultraluminous infrared galaxy with a star formation rate of 2.29 ± 0.05 M_{☉} per year.

== Description ==
IRAS F17179+5444 is described as a compact galaxy merger. It has a single nucleus, indicating the nuclei have completely coalesced with each other. It is also surrounded by tidal debris with an extension towards the southwest. Hubble Space Telescope continuum imaging shows the morphology of IRAS F17179+5444 to be complex, with two condensation components connected together by a bridge of diffused radio emission in its nuclear region. In the south of the region a long trail of continuum emission is seen emerging towards the southeast of the galaxy's side by 15 kiloparsecs. A series of dust features are seen crossing the nuclear regions of the galaxy.

The galaxy is found to contain a gigahertz-peaked spectrum (GPS) radio source based on Very Long Baseline Interferometry (VLBI) imaging. It has two components found having a separation of 68 milliarcseconds when imaged at 1.6 GHz. However, a 5 GHz high-resolution image also showed it has two much weaker components. Observations also found it is a radio-loud object with a power of 10^{25.23} W Hz^{−1} and a low frequency turnover.

IRAS F17179+5444 has warm ionized outflows. Based on studies, the outflow model of the galaxy is described as having three components; mainly a narrow component, a secondary narrow component and a broad component, being blueshifted by −157 ± 33 kilometers per second, in relation to the narrow component. The broad and narrow components are estimated to have full-width at half maximum measurements of 386 ± 14 and 1,543 ± 34 kilometer per seconds. There is also evidence of compact ionized nuclear outflows in the galaxy. with mass outflow rates of 20.1^{+72.9}_{−14.9} M_{☉} per year, and kinetic power of around 2.5 percent.
