= IRAS 12112+0305 =

Galaxy in the constellation of Virgo

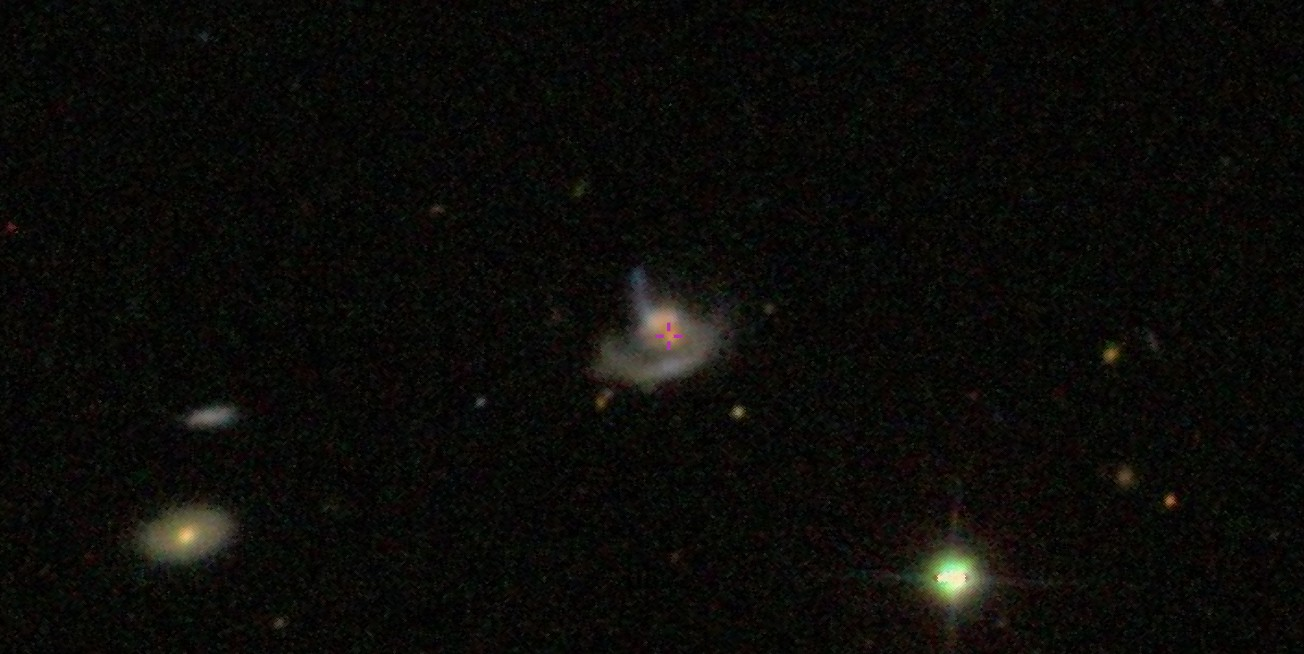
- The galaxy merger IRAS 12112+0305.

Observation data (J2000 epoch)
- Constellation: Virgo
- Right ascension: 12^{h} 13^{m} 46.0474^{s}
- Declination: +02° 48′ 41.292″
- Redshift: 0.073317
- Heliocentric radial velocity: 21,980 km/s
- Distance: 967 Mly

Characteristics
- Type: LINER; ULIRG HII
- Notable features: Luminous infrared galaxy

Other designations
- IRAS F12112+0305, PGC 39024, SFRS 180, AKARI J1213460+024843, C-GOALS 17

IRAS 12112+0305 is a galaxy merger located in the constellation of Virgo. Its redshift is (z) 0.0723, which means the object is located 970 million light years from Earth. It was first discovered by astronomers in 1987 from the IRAS bright galaxy sample. and has a LINER spectrum.

== Description ==
IRAS 12112+0305 is an ultraluminous infrared galaxy. It is classified as a post-merger involving two colliding spiral galaxies. Its appearance is distorted and it has two tidal tails; one showing an extension of 18 kiloparsecs to the north and another showing a looped arc stretching 30 kiloparsecs in a southern direction. Ultraviolet imaging shows star-forming clusters are present in the southern tail. The optical spectrum of the galaxy is described as LINER and a starburst based on its mid-infrared spectrum.

The galaxy has two galactic nuclei found to have a separation of less than 3 kiloparsecs with the northern nucleus being more luminous than the southern. Further evidence showed the northern nucleus is shaped into a crescent while the southern nucleus is described as becoming point-like when at longer wavelengths. A compact knot of radio emission is seen dominating the northern nucleus.

Optical imaging by Hubble Space Telescope (HST) and integral field optical spectroscopy by the INTEGRAL fiber-fed system showed the main body of the galaxy is clustered within three dominant regions. The first two regions, associated with the two nuclei, are located north and south respectively, along the position angle of 45°. The third region is located 3 arcseconds north of the southern region at a 20° position angle. I-band imaging by Hubble reveals the southern region as compact with high surface brightness, while the two regions are composed of several faint ionized gas components that are found evenly distributed along an arc-like structure and measuring around 8 kiloparsecs.

Radio imaging at high frequencies, shows a double structure with the two radio components having a separation gap of 4.4 kiloparsecs. These components have spectral indexes of 0.58 ± 0.11 and 0.80 ± 0.01 respectively, based on astronomers convolving three radio maps into a common resolution. The radio spectrum of the source is found to have a low frequency turnover at 290 MHz with a higher break frequency.

A candidate supernova was discovered within the vicinity of the galaxy between April and May 1995. Hydrogen absorption, hydroxide and carbon monoxide emission has also been detected from the galaxy, indicating turbulent motions.
