= IRAS 09104+4109 =

Galaxy in the constellation Lynx

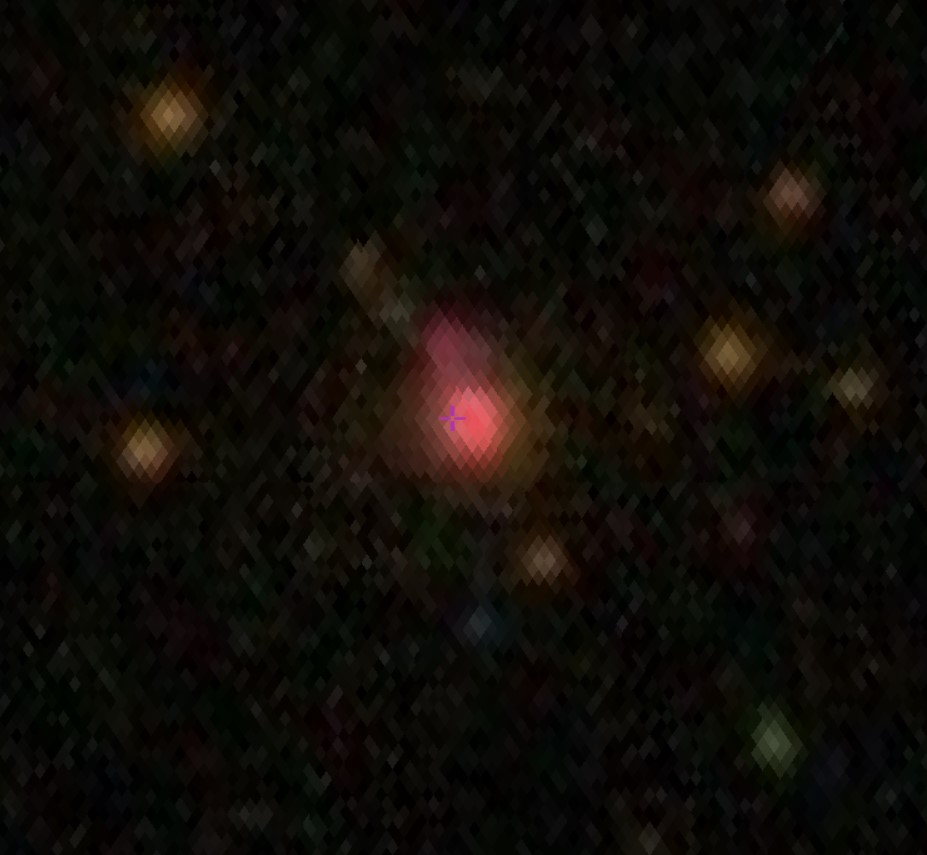
- IRAS 09104+4109 captured by SDSS

Observation data (J2000 epoch)
- Constellation: Lynx
- Right ascension: 09^{h} 13^{m} 45.49^{s}
- Declination: +40° 56′ 28.22″
- Redshift: 0.440797
- Heliocentric radial velocity: 132,148 km/s
- Distance: 4.754 Gly
- Group or cluster: MACS J0913.7+4056
- Apparent magnitude (V): 0.54
- Apparent magnitude (B): 0.43
- Surface brightness: 18.8

Characteristics
- Type: QSO2, HyLIRG
- Size: ~396,800 ly (121.66 kpc) (estimated)
- Apparent size (V): 0.14' × 0.09'
- Notable features: Hyperluminous infrared galaxy containing a quasar

Other designations
- WN B0910+4108, LEDA 97525, NVSS J091345+405630, IRAS F09105+4108, RX J0913.7+4056, 2XMM J091345.5+405629, 2CXO J091345.5+405628

IRAS 09104+4109 is a galaxy located in the constellation Lynx. With a redshift of 0.440797, the light travel time for this galaxy, corresponds to 4.75 billion light-years from Earth. It is the brightest cluster galaxy in MACS J0913.7+4056 galaxy cluster and classified as a hyperluminous infrared galaxy.

== Features ==
IRAS 09104+4109 has an active galactic nucleus (AGN). It is a Seyfert type 2 galaxy with a strong emission-line spectrum, but no broad lines. Moreover, IRAS 09104+4109 is classified a cD galaxy inside a cool rich cluster of galaxies, experiencing a cooling flow. The galaxy is the most luminous object to be discovered by IRAS survey, emitting 6 × 10^{12} L_{sun} h^{−2}. 99% of its energy emerges at infrared wavelengths. The high luminosity of IRAS 09104+4109 might be related to an interaction with one or more members of the rich cluster in which it lies. It is selected by its strong 60 m emission (>0.5 Jy), yet faint optical magnitude (V>18).

The galaxy shows a "warm" far-IR color similar to luminous quasars. It is suggested much of the far-IR emission is emitted from dust heated by the central ultraviolet (UV) continuum source. The rest frame of UV/optical spectrum of the nucleus shows a type 2 spectrum with strong, narrow emission lines covering a range of ionizations. This implies photoionization by a strong UV nonthermal continuum.

IRAS 09104+4109 has a luminosity bolometer of ~ 10^{12.6} h^{−2} L_{sun}, which its optical spectrum is characterized by presence of narrow emission lines. These findings, found there is a quasar inside IRAS 09104+4109, ionizing the narrow-line region within ~130 pc of its central engine. Furthermore, IRAS 09104+4109 produces a radio jet.

A study conducted in 2007, proves IRAS 09104+4109 as the first "changing-look quasar". The X-ray emission in the EPIC band is dominated by the intra-cluster medium thermal emission, which the quasar contributes ~35% of the total flux in the 2–10 keV band.

Further studies in 2012, showed that IRAS 09104+4109 is a rare example of a dust enshrouded quasar, associated with a double-lobed radio source at the position angle of =333°. However, the steep radio spectral index and misalignment between the jets and ionized optical emission suggested that the orientation of the quasar in IRAS 09104+4109 had changed. Proving this hypothesis, researchers used a combination of new, multiband Giant Metrewave Radio Telescope observations and archival radio data and confirmed that the jets in IRAS 09104+ 4109, estimated to 20-160 Myr, are no longer actively fed by energetic particles. This results suggested that the realignment of the quasar, the cessation of jet activity and the onset of rapid star formation in IRAS 09104+4109, may have been caused by a gas-rich galaxy merger.

A Northern Extended Millimeter Array (NOEMA) found traces of carbon oxide (2–1) in the z=0.4418 cluster-central IRAS 09104+4109, which ~4.5 × 10^{10} M sol of molecular gas is found, in and around the galaxy. The gas is located in a series of clumps extending along the old radio jets and lobes. It has a relatively low velocity dispersion of (336 [+39,-35] km/s FWHM) and shows no velocity gradients indicative of outflow or infall. Roughly, half its gas is located in a central clump on the northeast side of the galaxy overlapping a bright ionized gas filament and a spur of excess X-ray emission, suggesting that this is a location of rapid cooling.

The molecular gas is extended usually to a ~55 kpc radius. This gas is comparable to the scale of the filamentary nebula in the Perseus cluster, falling within the thermal instability radius of the intracluster medium (ICM), within ~70 kpc. Continuum measurements at 159.9 GHz from NOEMA and 850 micron from the JCMT SCUBA-2 show excess far infrared emission, which was interpreted as free-free emission arising from ongoing starburst. These observations suggest that the ICM cooling is not strongly affected by its buried quasar which can build gas reservoirs to fuel reorientation and quasar-activity of its central AGN.
