= IRAS 05189−2524 =

Galaxy in the constellation Lepus

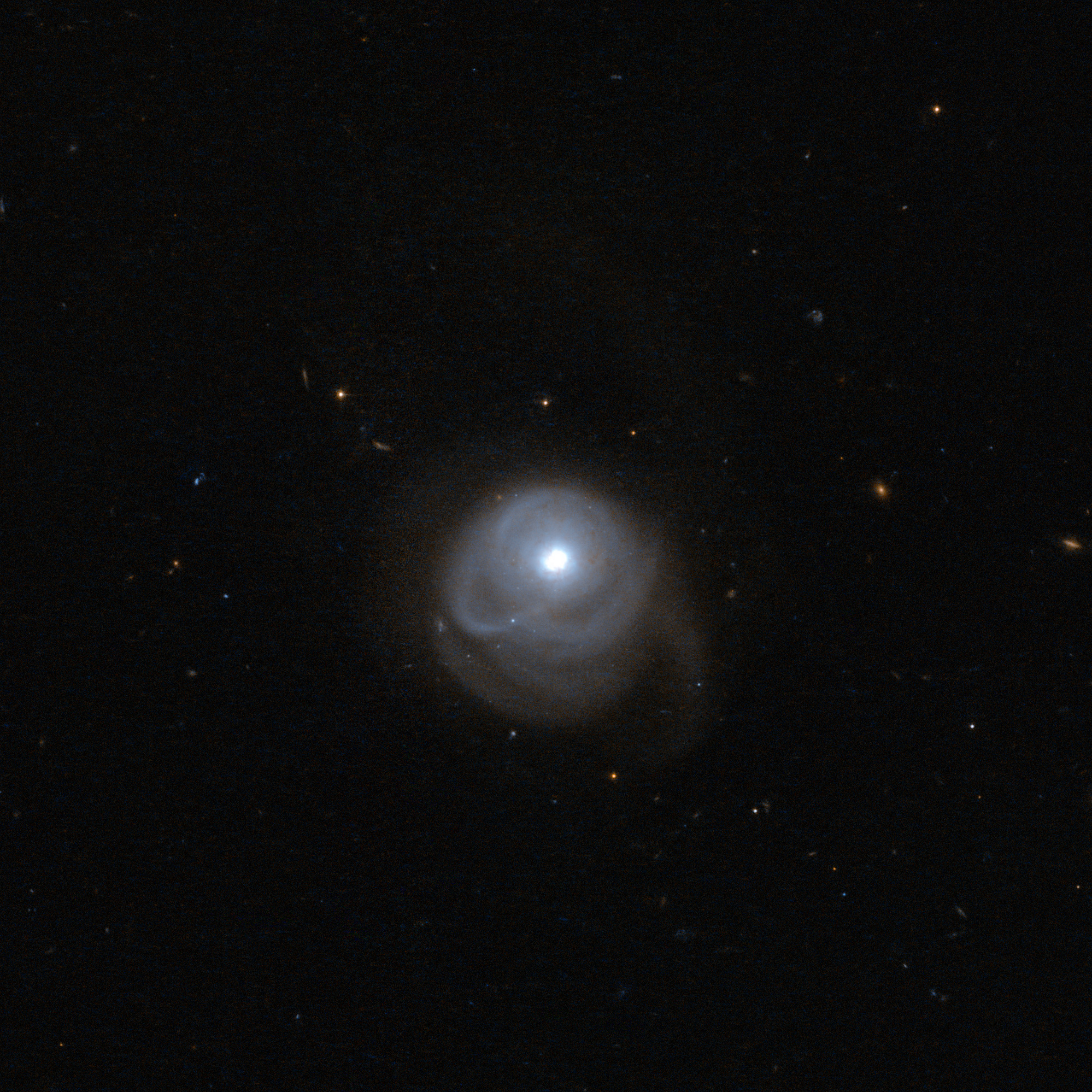
- Hubble Space Telescope image of IRAS 05189−2524

Observation data (J2000 epoch)
- Constellation: Lepus
- Right ascension: 05^{h} 21^{m} 01.3927s^{s}
- Declination: −25° 21′ 45.229″
- Redshift: 0.042750
- Heliocentric radial velocity: 12,816 km/s
- Distance: 603 Mly (185 Mpc)
- Apparent magnitude (V): 15.4

Characteristics
- Type: Pec; ULIRG, Sy2
- Size: 75,000 ly
- Apparent size (V): 0.46 x 0.44 arcmin
- Notable features: Galaxy merger, luminous infrared galaxy

Other designations
- PGC 17155, 2MASS J05210139−2521452, AKARI J0521013−252146, MRSS 486-006230, NVSS J052101−252145, 1WGA J0521.0−2521, SWIFT J0521.0−2522, LEDA 17155, 2MASX J05210136−2521450

IRAS 05189−2524 is a galaxy merger located in the constellation Lepus. It is located 603 million light-years away from the Solar System and has an approximate diameter of 75,000 light years.

== A luminous galaxy ==
IRAS 05189−2524 is classified as an ultraluminous infrared galaxy (ULIRG), which is formed by two interacting gas-rich spiral galaxies that merged together. Signs left by merging process, included a single bright nucleus and an outer structure consisting one-sided extension of the inner arms, with its tidal tail formed by material ripped from the galaxies by gravitational forces.

IRAS 05189−2524 is one of the brightest local ULIRG in X-ray with a E = 2–10 keV continuum luminosity of ~1043 erg/s This tends to vary over time in which the E = 0.5–2 keV was relatively constant during the 2001-2002 observation done by XMM Newton and Chandra. But in 2006 study done by Suzaku shows it was a factor of ~30 lower. The galaxy has a power output above 10 times that of the Sun, emitting a tremendous amount of light at infrared wavelengths.

Moreover, IRAS 05189−2524 is classified an optical Seyfert 2 galaxy, presenting a hidden broadline region. A study noticed there is ~70% percent of the bolometric luminosity attributed to its active galactic nucleus, thus making it a quasar. It is represented by its dust enshrouded stage which is shed over time by the nuclei. There is a sign of high-velocity large-scale outflows detached in neutral, ionized and molecular gas phrases.

An observation by XMM Newton and NuSTAR, shows evidence for a blueshifted Fe K absorption feature at E = 7.8 KeV which indicates there is an ultrafast outflow (UFO) with vout = 0.11 ± 0.01c. A relative disk reflection in the broadband X-ray spectrum, shows a highly asymmetric board Fe Kα emission line that extends down to 3 KeV with a Compton scattering component above 10 KeV.

Further studies shows there is a new, quasi-luminous hard X-ray and near-IR spectra in IRAS 05189−2524. The Seyfert nucleus is Compton-thin and the near-IR board lines are seen in transmission, similar to X-rays and the medium has an Aṿ/ɴH ratio that is lower than Galactic. Also, the increase in obscuration at latter approach shows less △Aṿ/△Nн compared to Galactic, thus supporting a correlation between the proximity to the center and properties of obscuring matter. Most of the observed polarization is due to dichroism given the fact, the measured A_{V} is compatible with the broad component of Нα seen in transmission.

There are Na i D emission in the system traces dusty filaments on the near side of an extended active galactic nucleus in IRAS 05189−2524 which has projected velocities up to 2000 km/s. These filaments simultaneously obscure the stellar continuum, serving as complementary probe of the wind, in which they are the strongest in regions of low foreground obscuration.
