= IRAS 14348−1447 =

Galaxy in the constellation Libra

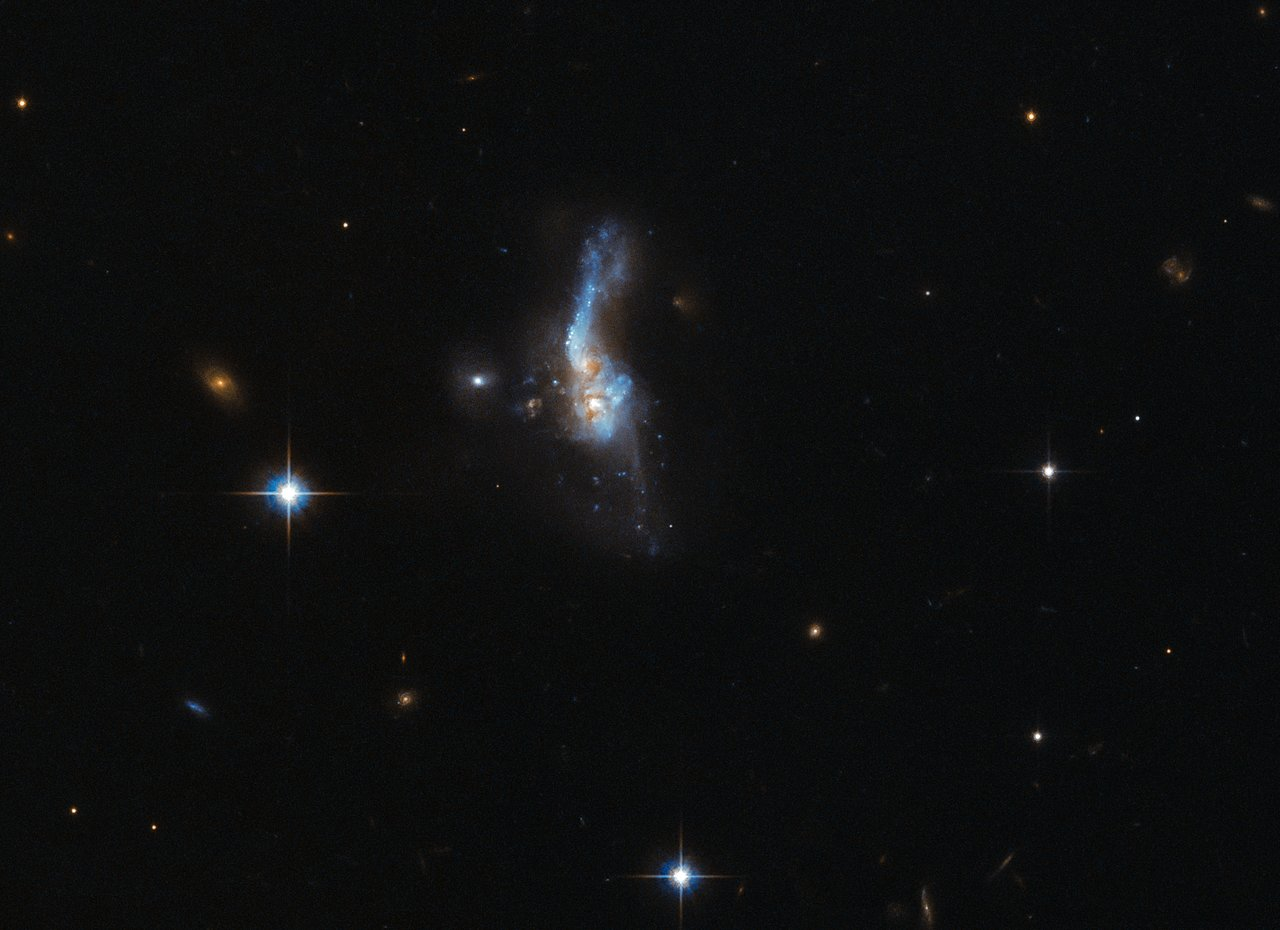
- Hubble Space Telescope image of IRAS 14348−1447

Observation data (J2000 epoch)
- Constellation: Libra
- Right ascension: 14^{h} 37^{m} 38.491^{s}
- Declination: −15° 00′ 19.12″
- Redshift: 0.082881
- Heliocentric radial velocity: 24,847 km/s
- Distance: 1 billion light-years
- Apparent magnitude (V): 16.58

Characteristics
- Type: Merger; ULIRG, LINER
- Notable features: Galaxy merger, ultraluminous infrared galaxy

Other designations
- PGC 52270, 2MASX J14373831–1500239, GNH 035, IDEOS 04981248_00, 6dF J1437382–150024, 2XMM J143738.3–150023, NPM1G -14.0541, 2MASS J14373828–1500241, LEDA 52270

IRAS 14348−1447 known as PGC 52270, are a pair of spiral galaxies located 1 billion light-years away in the constellation of Libra. The galaxy IRAS 14348−1447NE, is in the early process of merging with IRAS 14348−1447SW, causing gravity to pull stars from both galaxies and forming tidal tails. As the interaction takes place, molecular gas is swirled about and creating emission that is responsible for the galaxies' ultraluminous appearance.

IRAS 14348−1447, is classified a Seyfert 1 galaxy and has an active galactic nucleus, indicating certain activity in its supermassive black hole has awakened, possibly turning it into a quasar.
