= MCG-03-04-014 =

Galaxy located in the constellation Cetus

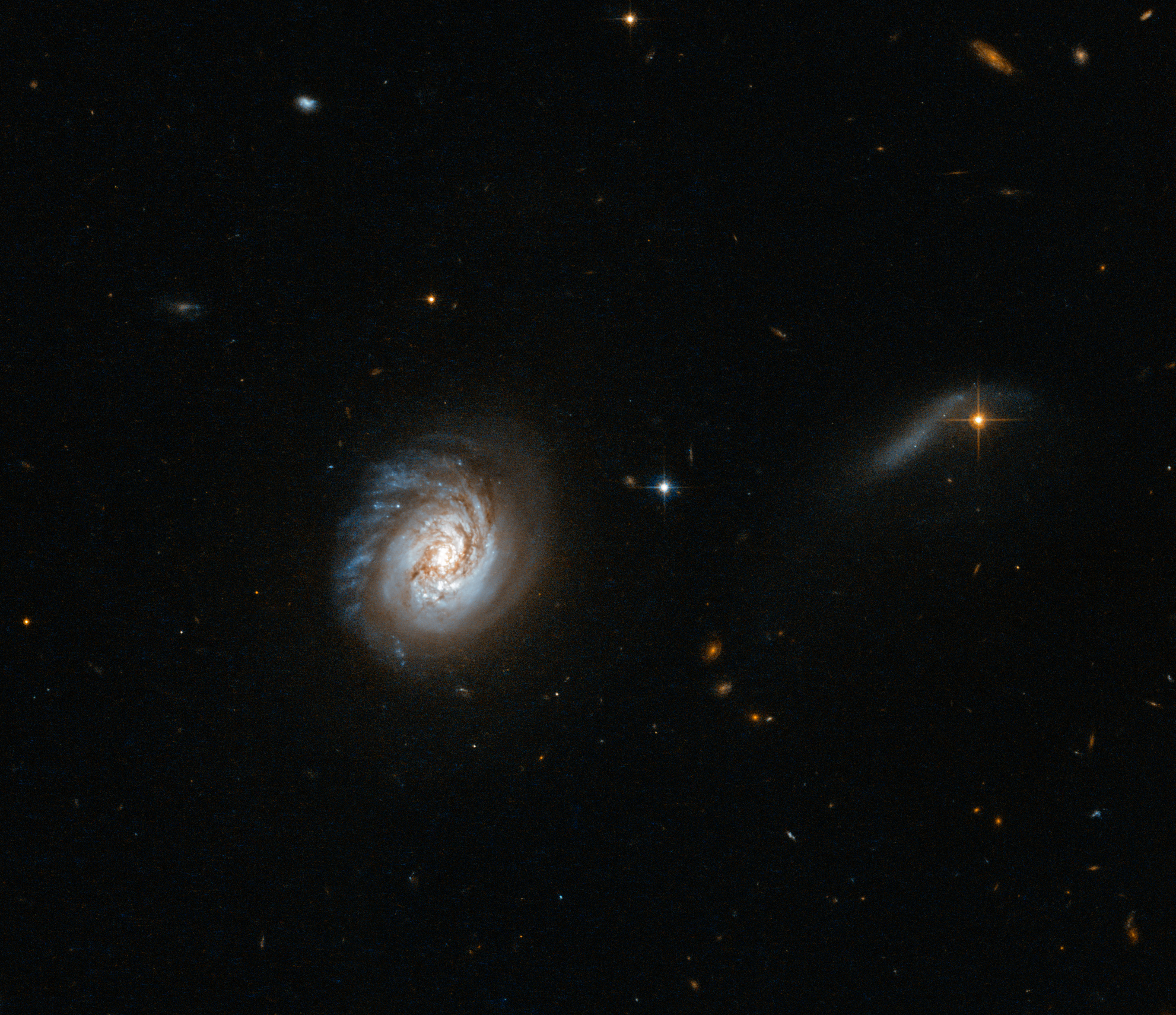
- Hubble Space Telescope image of MCG-03-04-014

Observation data (J2000 epoch)
- Constellation: Cetus
- Right ascension: 01^{h} 10^{m} 08.979^{s}
- Declination: −16° 51′ 09.69″
- Redshift: 0.035144
- Heliocentric radial velocity: 10,536 km/s
- Distance: 450 Mly (138 Mpc)
- Apparent magnitude (V): 14.92

Characteristics
- Type: LIRG, HII
- Size: 120,000 ly
- Notable features: Luminous infrared galaxy

Other designations
- PGC 4167, IRAS F01076-1707, 2MASX J01100897-1651096, 6dF J0110090-165110, GSC 5851 00663, NVSS J011008-165109, AKARI J0110089-165112, WISEA J011008.95-165109.9, 2MASS J01100892-1651097, 2XMM J011008.8-165111

MCG-03-04-014 or PGC 4167, is a spiral galaxy located 450 million light-years in the constellation of Cetus. MCG-03-04-014 is classified as a luminous infrared galaxy, meaning it has high star-formation regions. MCG-03-04-014 has a galactic center that is obscured by dust lanes and presents an abundant supply of molecular gas. The reasons behind the luminosity of this galaxy are debated among astronomers. Some attribute it to recent starbursts, while others point to activity in the galaxies' supermassive black holes. It is also considered that both factors may contribute. The exact cause remains uncertain.

According to SIMBAD, it is considered to be a Seyfert type 1 galaxy, hence the possible reason for its luminosity level.
