= NGC 1614 =

Galaxy in the constellation Eridanus

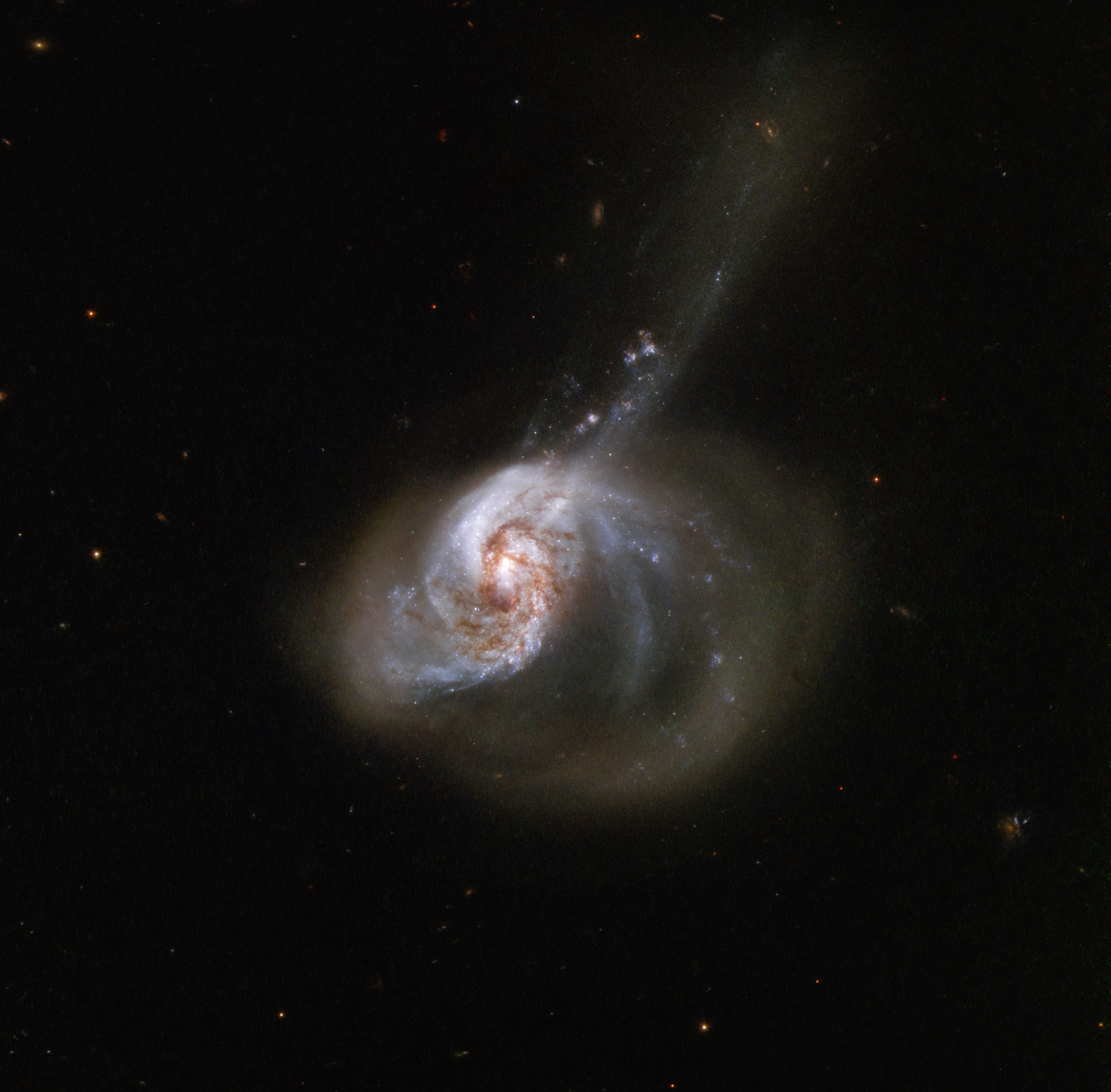
- Hubble Space Telescope image of NGC 1614

Observation data (J2000 epoch)
- Constellation: Eridanus
- Right ascension: 04^{h} 34^{m} 00.027^{s}
- Declination: −08° 34′ 44.57″
- Redshift: 0.015938±0.000033
- Heliocentric radial velocity: 4,778
- Distance: 211.3 Mly (64.78 Mpc)

Characteristics
- Type: SB(s)c pec.
- Notable features: Starburst galaxy with an active galactic nucleus

Other designations
- 2MASX J04340002-0834445, APG 186, IRAS 04315-0840, Mrk 0617, II Zw 015, PGC 15538

NGC 1614 is the New General Catalogue identifier for a spiral galaxy in the equatorial constellation of Eridanus. It was discovered on December 29, 1885 by American astronomer Lewis Swift, who described it in a shorthand notation as: pretty faint, small, round, a little brighter middle. The nebula was then catalogued by Danish-Irish astronomer J. L. E. Drayer in 1888. When direct photography became available, it was noted that this galaxy displayed some conspicuous peculiarities. American astronomer Halton Arp included it in his 1966 Atlas of Peculiar Galaxies. In 1971, Swiss astronomer Fritz Zwicky described it as a "blue post-eruptive galaxy, compact patchy core, spiral plumes, long blue jet SSW".

In the De Vaucouleurs system for classifying galaxies, NGC 1614 has a galaxy morphological classification of SB(s)c pec. The SB indicates this is a barred spiral galaxy, while the '(s)' means it lacks a ring-like structure around the nucleus. The trailing 'c' describes the spiral arm structure as being loosely wound. The peculiar nature of the galaxy is noted with the 'pec.' abbreviation. The galaxy is bright at the center, with two nearly symmetrical inner spiral arms. It is a luminous infrared source, with total infrared luminosity is 10^{11.60} L_{☉}, ranking 55th in the 2003 IRAS Revised Bright Galaxy Sample, and is the second most luminous galaxy within 75 Mpc.

This galaxy is undergoing a minor merger event with a gas-rich, low-mass companion galaxy, located in a tidal tail to the southwest of the nucleus. The main galaxy is estimated to be around 3−5 times as massive as the merging object. The interaction between the two galaxies is triggering a burst of star formation in NGC 1614, although not apparently an active galactic nucleus. It is described as "one of the most extreme nearby starbursts".

In the core region, a 230 pc radius ring feature has formed around the nucleus within the last 5−10 million years from an inflow of gas caused by the merger event, and this structure is the site of the intense star forming activity known as a starburst region. This activity is bright enough that it is masking whatever weak nuclear emission there is coming from the core. The nucleus itself displays evidence of an older starburst event. The starburst activity is presumed to be driving an observed outflow of cold molecular gas that has a combined mass of around 32 million times the mass of the Sun.

== Supernovae ==
Two supernovae have been observed in NGC 1614:

- SN 1996D (Type Ic, mag. 18.2) was discovered by L. Drissen, C. Robert, Y. Dutil, and J.-R. Roy on 9 February 1996.
- SN 2020cuj (Type II, mag. 20) was discovered by the Zwicky Transient Facility on 12 February 2020.
