= WISE J224607.57−052635.0 =

Most luminous galaxy in the Universe

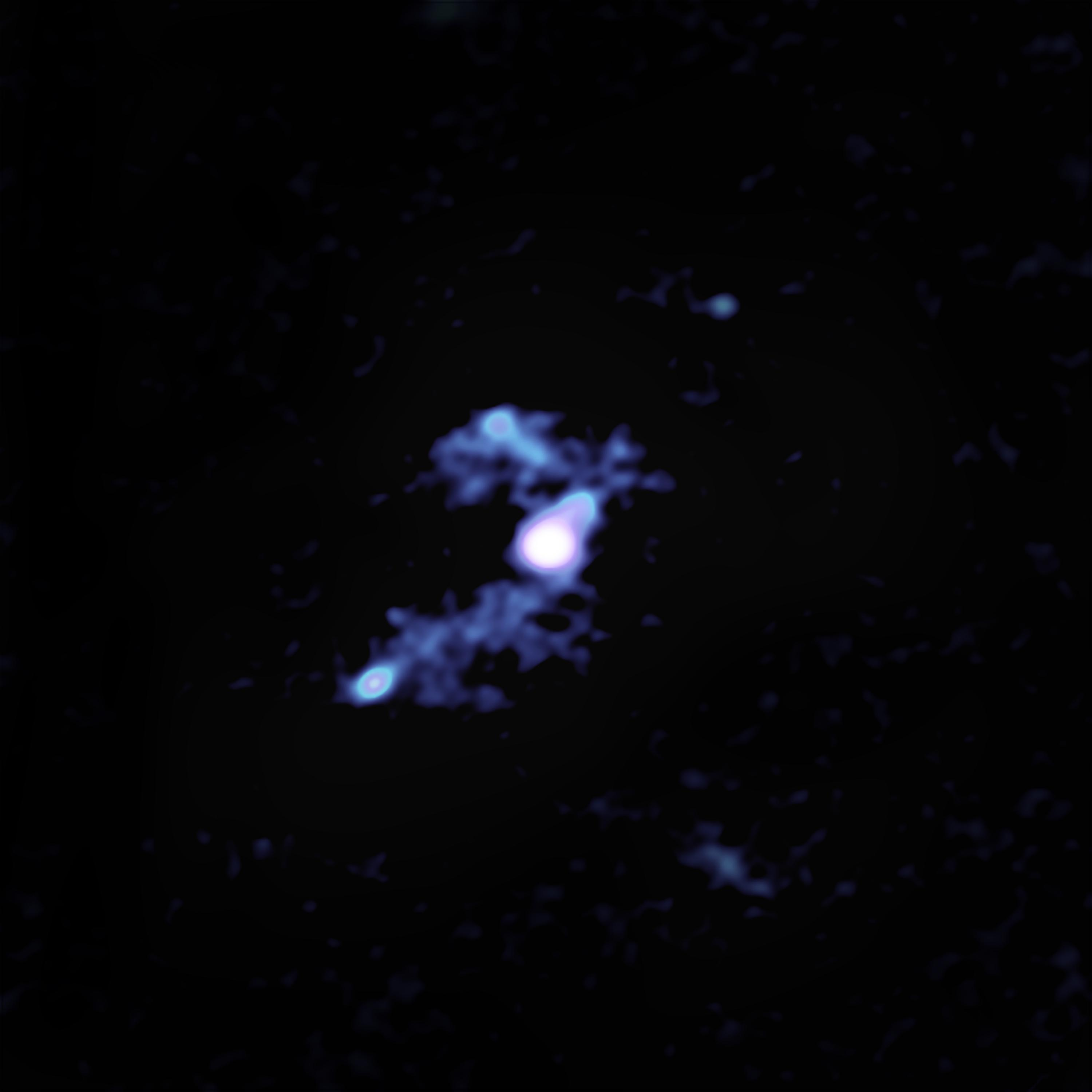
- ALMA image of W2246−0526 merging with three nearby smaller galaxies

Observation data (J2000 epoch)
- Constellation: Aquarius
- Right ascension: 22^{h} 46^{m} 07.57^{s}
- Declination: −05° 26′ 35.0″
- Redshift: 4.593
- Distance: 12,000 Gly (3,680 Gpc) (Light travel distance) 24,420 Gly (7,488 Gpc) (Comoving distance)

Characteristics
- Type: LIRG
- Size: 30,000 ly (9,200 pc) (W2246-0526); 100,000 ly (31,000 pc)
- Apparent size (V): 0.008 x 0.004 (W2246-0526); 0.03 x 0.015
- Notable features: Interacting galaxies

Other designations
- W2246−0526; WISE 2246−0526; WISE J224607.55−052634.9; WISE J224607.56−052634.9, SDSS J224607.65-052639.4, [JBS2014] WJ2246-0526

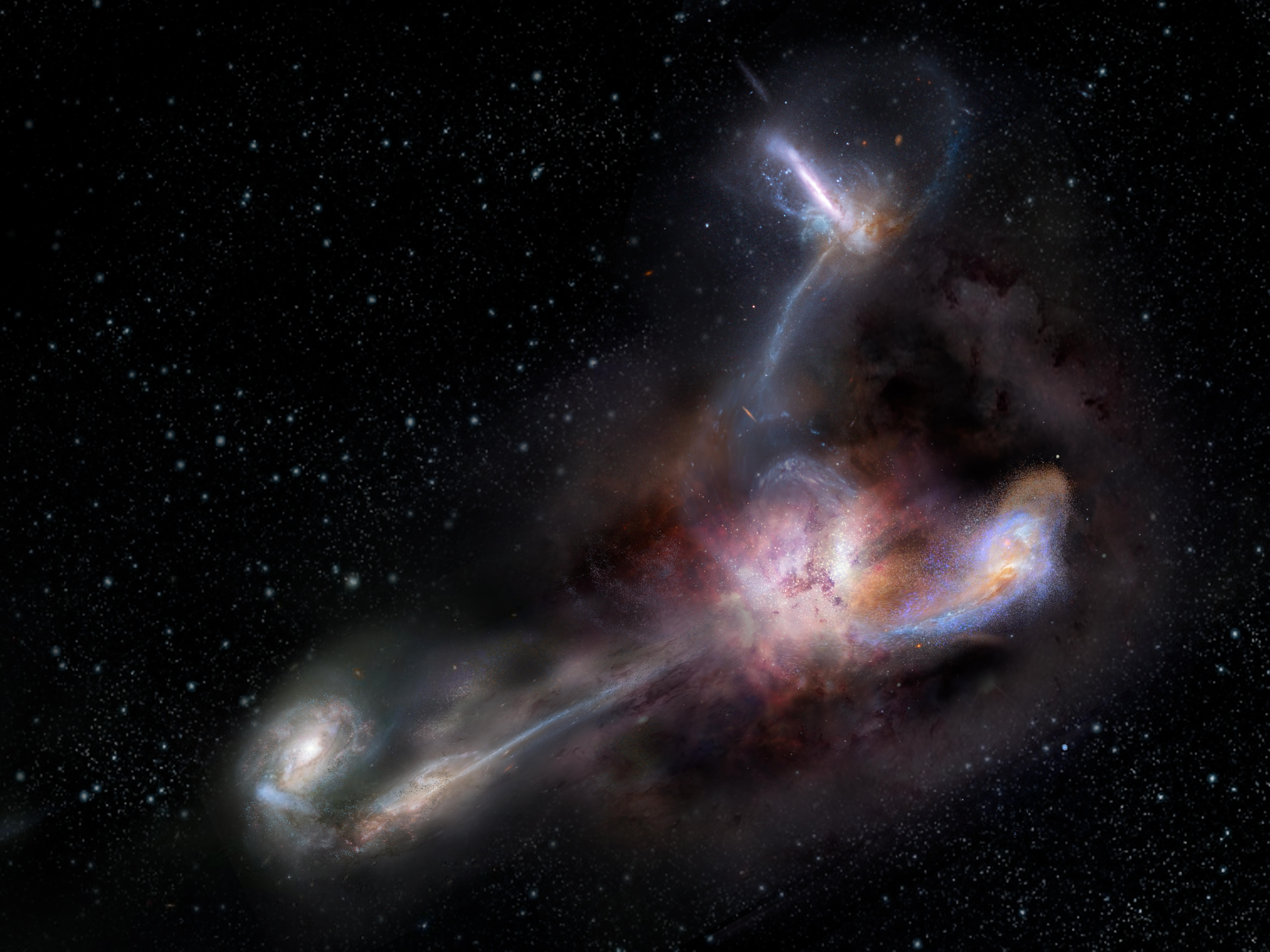
Artist's impression of W2246-0526

WISE J224607.57−052635.0 (or W2246−0526 for short) is an extremely luminous infrared galaxy (ELIRG) which, in 2015, was announced as the most luminous known galaxy in the observable universe. The brightness of this galaxy is 350 trillion times that of the Sun (349 trillion L_{☉}). The merger of smaller nearby galaxies may be contributing to its brightness. The light is generated by a quasar 10 billion times the mass of the Sun. The high energy optical light and ultraviolet light emitted by the accretion disc around the quasar's supermassive black hole is absorbed by the galaxy's dust and re-emitted in the infrared. The galaxy releases 10,000 times more energy than the Milky Way galaxy, although WISE J224607.57–052635.0 is the smaller of the two. WISE J224607.57–052635.0 has a light-travel distance of 12.5 billion light years from it to Earth. The galaxy was discovered using the Wide-field Infrared Survey Explorer.

== See also ==
- SDSS J0100+2802, hyperluminous quasar
