= 5010 Amenemhêt =

Main-belt asteroid

Discovery
- Discovered by: C. van Houten; I. van Houten; T. Gehrels
- Discovery site: Palomar Obs.
- Discovery date: 24 September 1960

Designations
- Pronunciation: /ˈæmənəmhɛt/
- Named after: Amenemḥēt III (Pharaoh, 12th Dyn.)
- Alternative designations: 4594 P-L · 1981 EU_{32} 1990 FA_{1}
- Minor planet category: main-belt · (middle)

Orbital characteristics
- Epoch 4 September 2017 (JD 2458000.5)
- Uncertainty parameter 0
- Observation arc: 61.77 yr (22,563 days)
- Aphelion: 3.2675 AU
- Perihelion: 2.1604 AU
- Semi-major axis: 2.7140 AU
- Eccentricity: 0.2040
- Orbital period (sidereal): 4.47 yr (1,633 days)
- Mean anomaly: 35.377°
- Mean motion: 0° 13^{m} 13.44^{s} / day
- Inclination: 14.660°
- Longitude of ascending node: 173.36°
- Argument of perihelion: 43.103°

Physical characteristics
- Dimensions: 9.40 km (calculated)
- Synodic rotation period: 3.2 h 3.390±0.002 h
- Geometric albedo: 0.20 (assumed)
- Spectral type: SMASS = S · S
- Absolute magnitude (H): 12.5 · 12.67±0.42

5010 Amenemhêt is a stony asteroid from the central region of the asteroid belt, approximately 9 kilometers in diameter.

It was discovered on 24 September 1960, by Dutch astronomer couple Ingrid and Cornelis van Houten at Leiden, on photographic plates taken by Dutch–American astronomer Tom Gehrels at the U.S Palomar Observatory, California, and assigned the provisional designation 4594 P-L. It was later named after the Egyptian pharaoh Amenemhět III.

== Orbit and classification ==
Amenemhêt orbits the Sun in the central main-belt at a distance of 2.2–3.3 AU once every 4 years and 6 months (1,633 days). Its orbit has an eccentricity of 0.20 and an inclination of 15° with respect to the ecliptic. Its observation arc already begins in 1955, due to precoveries taken at the U.S. Goethe Link Observatory in Indiana.

== Physical characteristics ==
In the SMASS taxonomic scheme, Amenemhêt is classified as a common stony asteroid with a S-type spectrum. It has also been characterized as a S-type by Pan-STARRS' large-scale survey.

=== Lightcurve ===
A rotational lightcurve was obtained through photometric observations at the Serbian Belgrade Astronomical Observatory in May 2008. Lightcurve analysis showed a period of 3.390 hours with a brightness amplitude of 0.18 magnitude (U=3-), superseding a previous lightcurve from two South-American observatories (U=1).

=== Diameter and albedo ===
The Collaborative Asteroid Lightcurve Link assumes a standard albedo for stony asteroids of 0.20 and calculates a diameter of 9.4 kilometers with an absolute magnitude of 12.5.

== Palomar–Leiden survey ==
The survey designation "P-L" stands for Palomar–Leiden, named after Palomar Observatory and Leiden Observatory, which collaborated on the fruitful Palomar–Leiden survey in the 1960s. Gehrels used Palomar's Samuel Oschin telescope – also known as the 48-inch Schmidt Telescope – and shipped the photographic plates to Ingrid and Cornelis van Houten at Leiden where astrometry was carried out. The trio are credited with the discovery of several thousand minor planets.

== Naming ==
This minor planet was named after the Egyptian pharaoh Amenemhět III (1844–1797 B.C.), who built the Great Canal (Mer-Wer) and brought prosperity to the Faiyum Oasis by linking it with the Nile. The area then became a breadbasket for the country. At the Hawara site in Faiyum, he built a mortuary temple, which the Greek historian Herodotus referred to as "labyrinth". Amenemhět's father was the pharaoh Sesostris III (also see the minor planets 4414 Sesostris and 3092 Herodotus). The official naming citation was published on 1 September 1993 (M.P.C. 22505).
