= South America Galaxy =

Merging pair of ultraluminous infrared galaxies in the constellation Aquarius

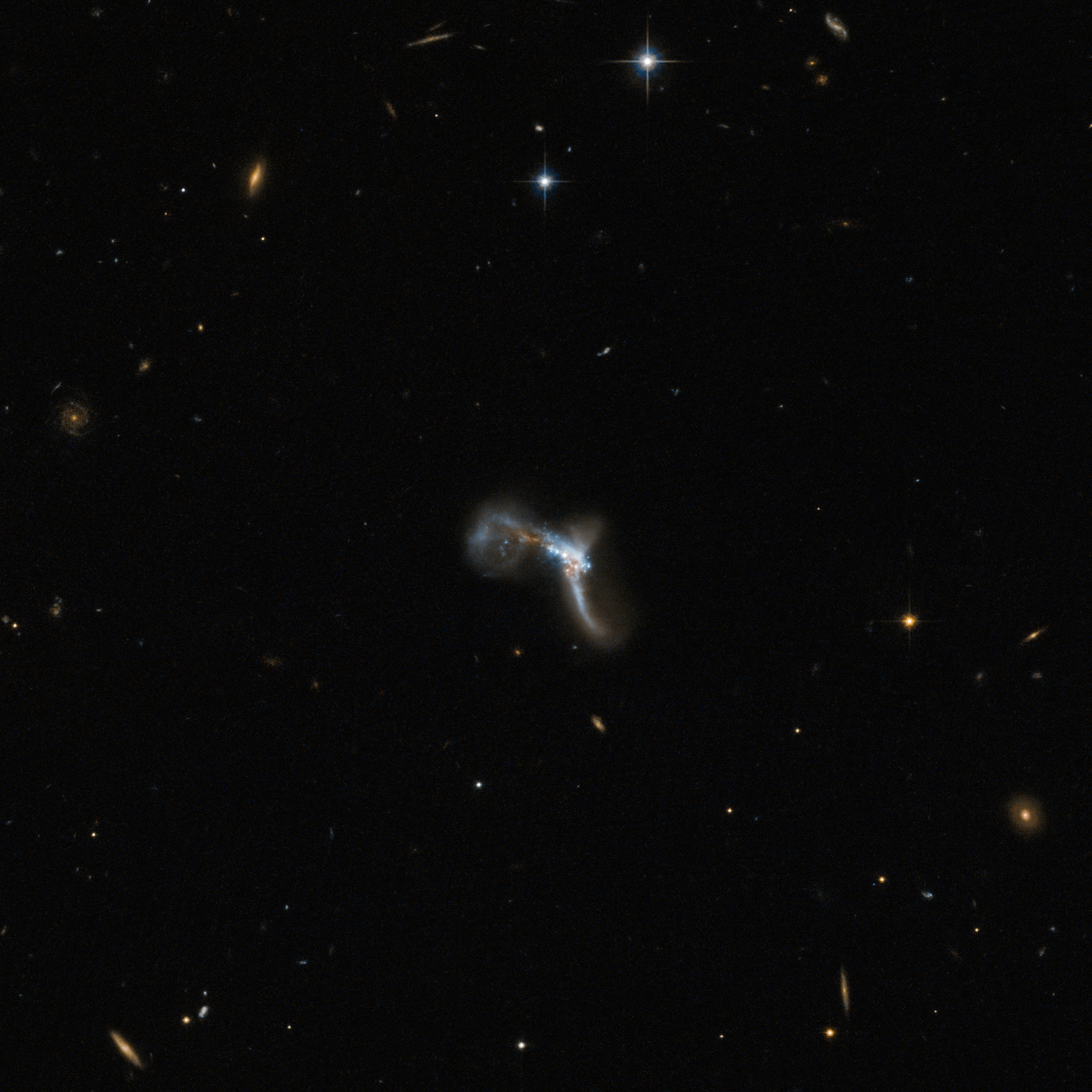
- The galaxy, as seen by the Hubble Space Telescope

Observation data (J2000 epoch)
- Constellation: Aquarius
- Right ascension: 22h 51m 49.2s
- Declination: −17° 52′ 23″
- Redshift: 0.077750
- Heliocentric radial velocity: 23,309 km/s
- Distance: 1.045 Gly (320.4 Mpc)
- Apparent magnitude (B): 16.15

Characteristics
- Type: LIG
- Size: 90,000 ly (estimated)
- Apparent size (V): 0.3' x 0.2'
- Notable features: Interacting galaxies

Other designations
- LEDA 69877, IRAS 22491-1808, PGC 69877, NVSS J225149-175225

The South America Galaxy, also known as LEDA 69877 and IRAS 22491-1808, is a merging pair of ultraluminous infrared galaxies located in the constellation Aquarius. It is estimated to be 1.045 billion light-years (320 million parsecs) from the Milky Way and about 90,000 ly (28,000 pc) in diameter. The object is moving away from the Solar System with a calculated radial velocity of approximately 23,309 kilometers per second (14,484 miles per second).

The galaxy got its nickname due to its physical resemblance to the continent of South America. The galaxy was selected as ESA/HUBBLE's picture of the week on 10 June 2013.

In the complex central region of the galaxy, scientists have been able to distinguish two nuclei, remains of the two different galaxies that are currently colliding. IRAS 22491-1808 is among the most luminous of these types of galaxies, and is considered to be mid-way through its merging stage.

According to a study published in 2017, the mass of the molecular gas outflow in IRAS 22491-1808 is estimated to be M_{H_{2}(hot)}~ (6–8)×10^{3} M_{☉}. Notably, it also shows lack of polarization.

== See also ==
- Lists of galaxies
