= ZW II 96 =

Pair of merging galaxies in the constellation Delphinus

Zwicky II 96
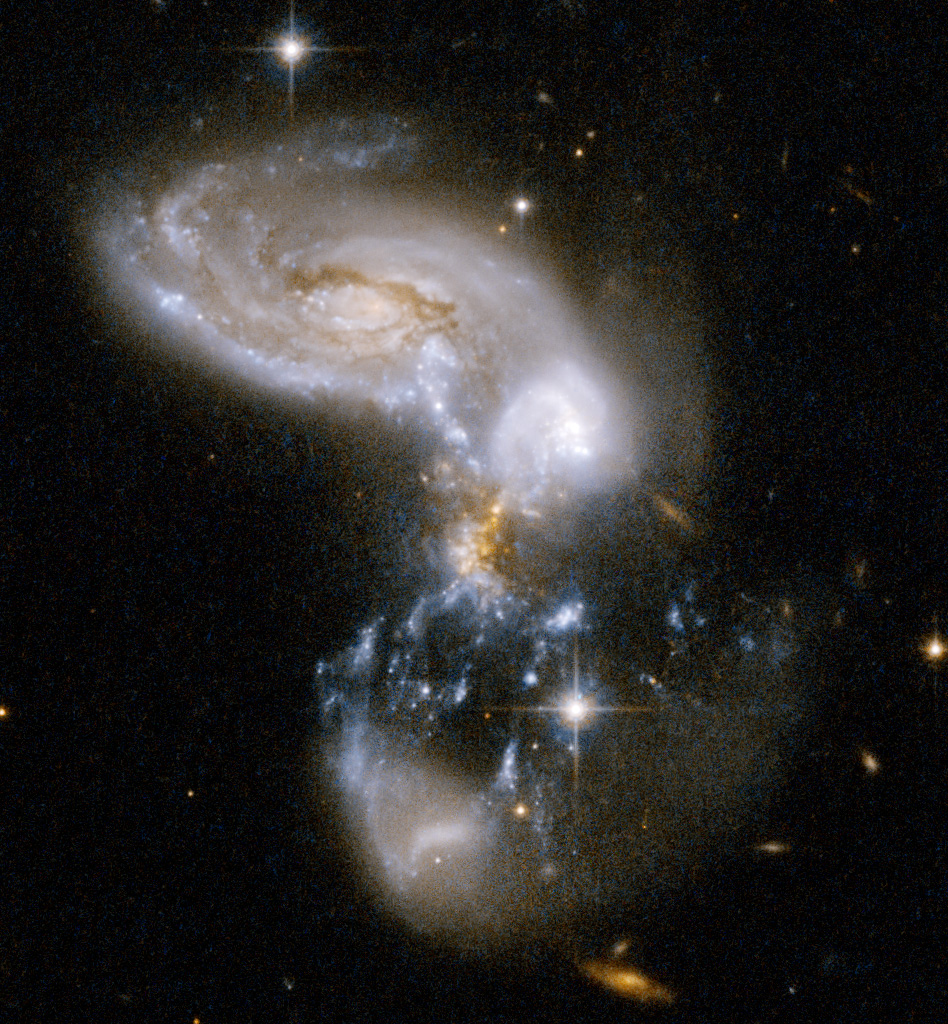
- Galaxy Interaction (ZW II 96)

Observation data (J2000 epoch)
- Constellation: Delphinus
- Right ascension: 20^{h} 57^{m} 23.94^{s}
- Declination: +17° 07′ 39.5″
- Redshift: 0.036098
- Heliocentric radial velocity: 10822 ± 9 km/s
- Distance: 0.5 Gly
- Apparent magnitude (V): 15.2

Characteristics
- Type: pair
- Apparent size (V): 0'.2
- Notable features: H II region

Other designations
- II Zw 096, IRAS 20550+1656, PGC 65779, CGCG 448-020

The object ZW II 96 (also II Zw 96) is a pair of galaxies that are merging. It is in the constellation Delphinus, about 500 million light-years from Earth. The first known reference to this galaxy comes from volume V of the Catalogue of Galaxies and of Clusters of Galaxies compiled by Fritz Zwicky in 1965, where it was listed as CGCG 448-020, and described as a "double system."

The shape of the merging galaxies is unusual; a number of powerful young starburst regions hang as long, threadlike structures between the main galaxy cores. The system is relatively luminous, but has not yet reached the late stage of coalescence that is typical for most ultraluminous systems.

The photograph is from a collection of 59 images of merging galaxies taken by the NASA/ESA Hubble Space Telescope released on 24 April 2008, on the 18th anniversary of its 1990 launch.

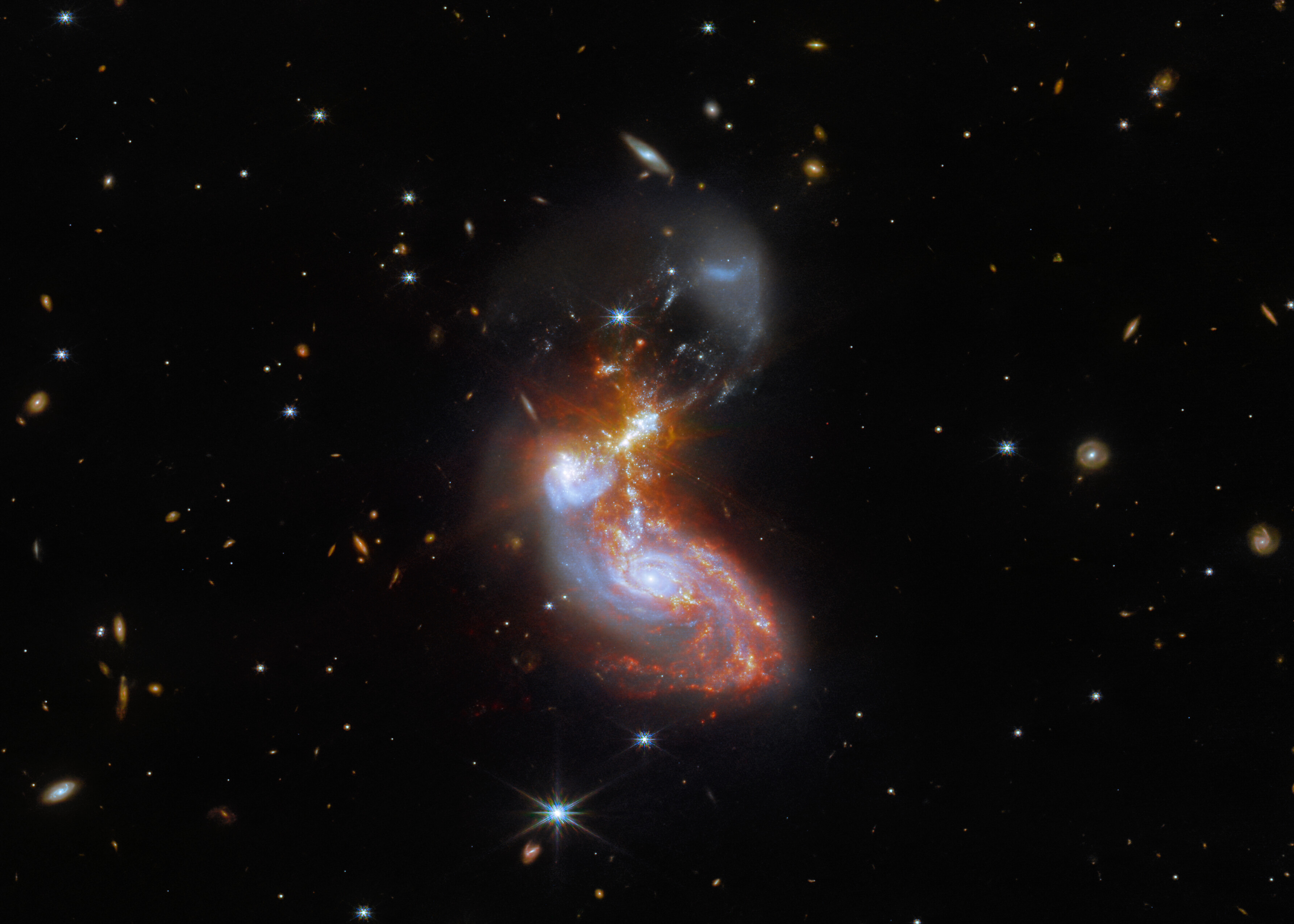
This image captured by James Webb Space Telescope
