= NGC 5010 =

Lenticular galaxy in the constellation Virgo

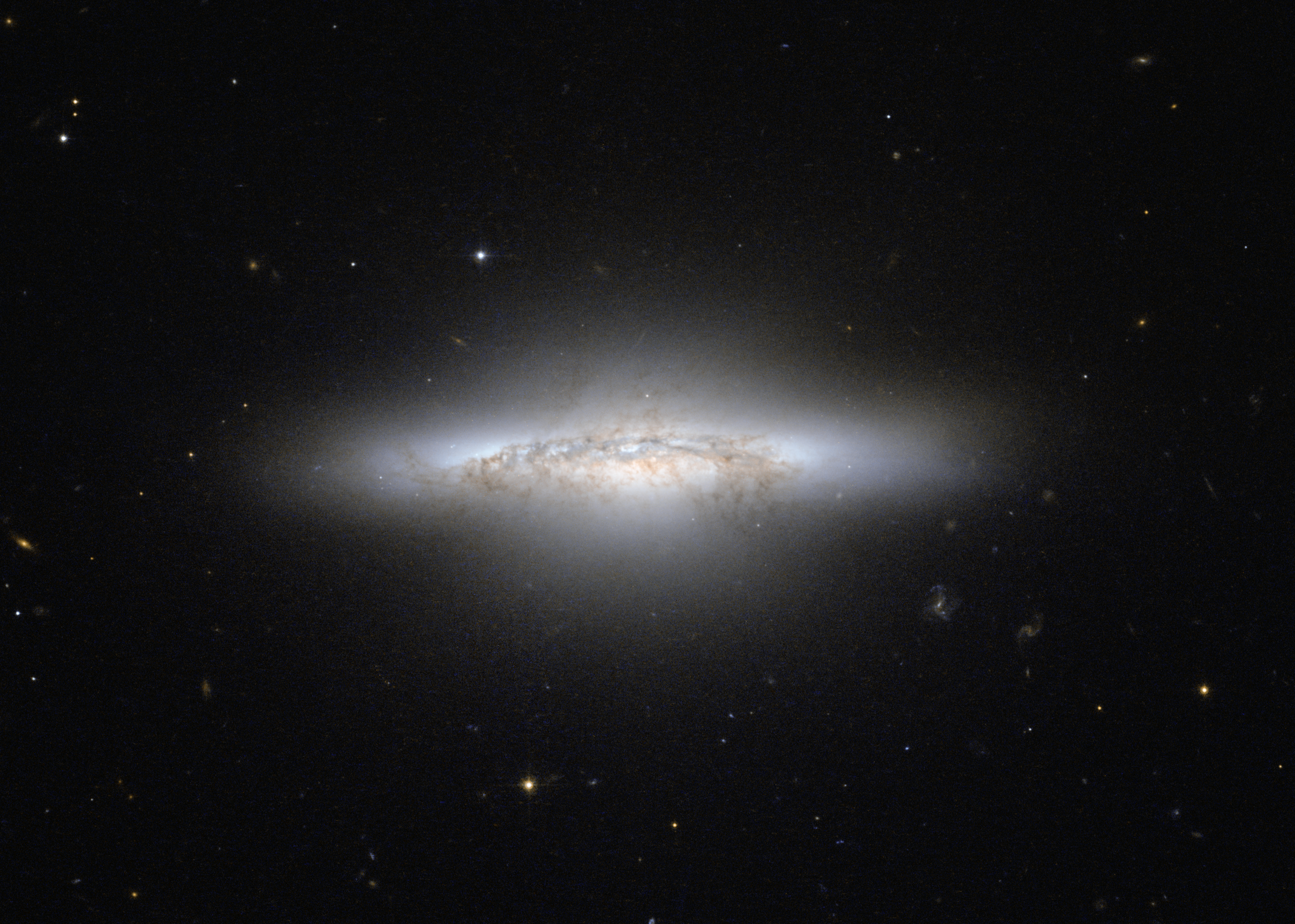
- NGC 5010 by HST

Observation data (J2000 epoch)
- Constellation: Virgo
- Right ascension: 13^{h} 12^{m} 26.3^{s}
- Declination: −15° 47′ 52″
- Redshift: 0.021581; 2975 ± 27 km/s
- Distance: 140 Mly
- Apparent magnitude (V): 14

Characteristics
- Type: S0^{+} pec sp
- Apparent size (V): 1.3′ × 0.6′

Other designations
- NGC 5010, PGC 45868

NGC 5010 is a lenticular galaxy located about 140 million light years away in the constellation Virgo. It was discovered by John Herschel on May 9, 1831. It is considered a Luminous Infrared Galaxy (LIRG). As the galaxy has few young blue stars and mostly red old stars and dust, it is transitioning from being a spiral galaxy to being an elliptical galaxy, with its spiral arms having burned out and become dusty arms. From the perspective of Earth, the galaxy is facing nearly edge-on.

== See also ==
- NGC 4261 – a similar elliptical galaxy
