= Arp 299 =

Pair of galaxies in the constellation Ursa Major

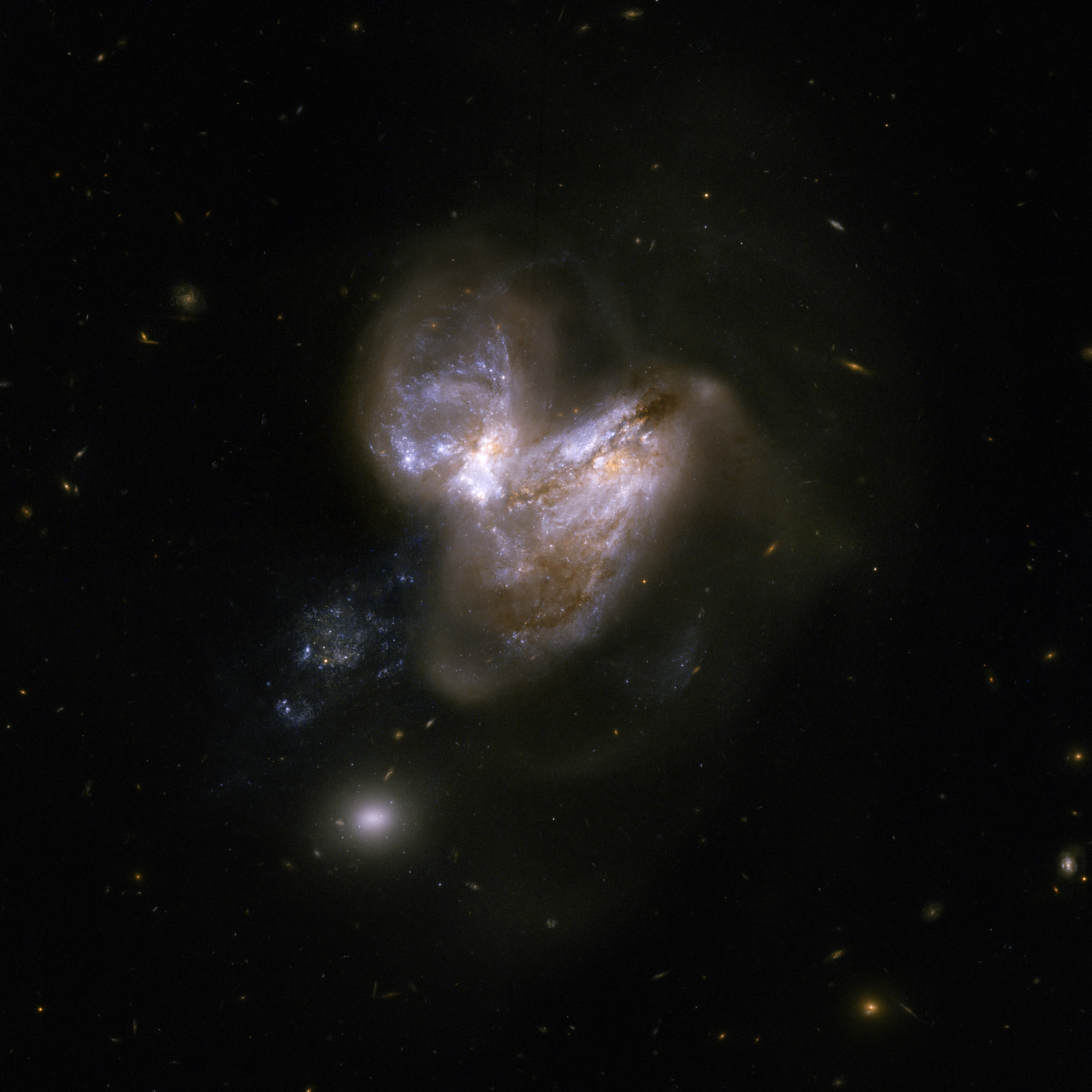
- Arp 299 with NGC 3690 (left) & IC 694 (right), imaged by the Hubble Space Telescope

Observation data (J2000 epoch)
- Constellation: Ursa Major
- Right ascension: 11^{h} 28^{m} 33.13^{s}
- Declination: +58° 33′ 58.0″
- Redshift: 0.010
- Distance: 130 Mly
- Apparent magnitude (V): 11

Characteristics
- Type: SBm pec. / IBm pec.
- Apparent size (V): 2.4′ × 1.9′
- Notable features: interacting galaxies

Other designations
- IC 694, NGC 3690, VV 118, Mrk 171

Arp 299 (parts of it also known as IC 694 and NGC 3690) is a pair of colliding galaxies approximately 134 million light-years away in the constellation Ursa Major. Both of the galaxies involved in the collision are barred irregular galaxies. NGC 3690 was discovered by German-British astronomer William Herschel on 18 March 1790.

It is not completely clear which object is historically called IC 694. According to some sources, the small appendage more than an arcminute northwest of the main pair is actually IC 694, not the primary (eastern) companion.

The interaction of the two galaxies in Arp 299 produced young powerful starburst regions similar to those seen in II Zw 96.

== Supernovae ==
Since 1992, fifteen supernovae have been detected in Arp 299:

Host	Designation	Type	Magnitude	Discovered by	Date	References
NGC 3690	SN 1992bu	unknown	16.6	Van Buren et al.	9 March 1992	
NGC 3690	SN 1993G	Type II	16.6	Lick Observatory Supernova Search (LOSS)	5 March 1993	
NGC 3690	SN 1998T	Type Ib	15.4	Beijing Astronomical Observatory	3 March 1998	
NGC 3690	SN 1999D	Type II	15.6	Beijing Astronomical Observatory	16 January 1999	
NGC 3690	SN 2018lrd	Type Ib	17.132	ATLAS	10 January 2018	
NGC 3690	AT 2018mel	Unknown	18.0119	Zwicky Transient Facility	16 May 2018	
NGC 3690	SN 2019lqo	Type II	18.33	Gaia Photometric Science Alerts	21 July 2019	
NGC 3690	SN 2020fkb	Type Ib	17.828	Automatic Learning for the Rapid Classification of Events (ALeRCE)	28 March 2020	
NGC 3690	SN 2022gnp	Type Ib	17.72	Zwicky Transient Facility	5 April 2022	
NGC 3690	SN 2023wrk	Type Ia	18.1	GOTO (telescope array)	4 November 2023	
NGC 3690	SN 2024gzk	Type IIb	17.78	E. Kankare et al.	12 April 2024	
NGC 3690	SN 2024agfq	Type IIn	19.05	E. Kankare et al.	8 June 2024	
IC 694	SN 2005U	Type II	16.2	S. Mattila et al.	30 January 2005	
IC 694	SN 2010O	Type Ib	15.6	Jack B. Newton and Tim Puckett	24 January 2010	
IC 694	SN 2010P	Type Ib/IIb	18.3	S. Mattila and E. Kankare	23 January 2010	

== See also ==
- Antennae Galaxies
- Mice Galaxies
