= Luminous infrared galaxy =

Galaxy with a high luminosity

Luminous infrared galaxies or LIRGs are galaxies with luminosities above 10^{11} L_{☉}. They are also referred to as submillimeter galaxies (SMGs) through their normal method of detection. LIRGs are more abundant than starburst galaxies, Seyfert galaxies and quasi-stellar objects at comparable luminosity. Infrared galaxies emit more energy in the infrared than at all other wavelengths combined. A LIRG's luminosity is 100 billion times that of the Sun.

Galaxies with luminosities above 10^{12} L_{☉} are known as ultraluminous infrared galaxies (ULIRGs). Galaxies exceeding 10^{13} L_{☉} are characterised as hyper-luminous infrared galaxies (HyLIRGs). Those exceeding 10^{14} L_{☉} are extremely luminous infrared galaxies (ELIRGs). Many of the LIRGs and ULIRGs are showing interactions and disruptions. Many of these types of galaxies spawn about 100 new stars a year as compared to the Milky Way which spawns one a year; this helps create the high level of luminosity.

== Discovery and characteristics ==
Infrared galaxies originally appeared to be single, gas-rich spirals whose infrared luminosity is created largely by the formation of stars within them. These types of galaxies were discovered in 1983 with IRAS. A LIRG's excess infrared luminosity may also come from the presence of an active galactic nucleus (AGN) residing at the center. It was ultimately found that many LIRGs are actually mergers of two or more gas-rich spiral galaxies, with the fraction of mergers to non-mergers increasing with increasing infrared luminosity.

These galaxies emit more energy in the infrared portion of the spectrum, not visible to the naked eye. The energy given off by LIRGs is comparable to that of a quasar (a type of AGN), which formerly was known as the most energetic object in the universe.

LIRGs are brighter in the infrared than in the optical spectrum because the visible light is absorbed by the high amounts of gas and dust, and the dust re-emits thermal energy in the infrared spectrum.

LIRGs are known to exist in denser parts of the universe than non-LIRGs.

== ULIRG ==
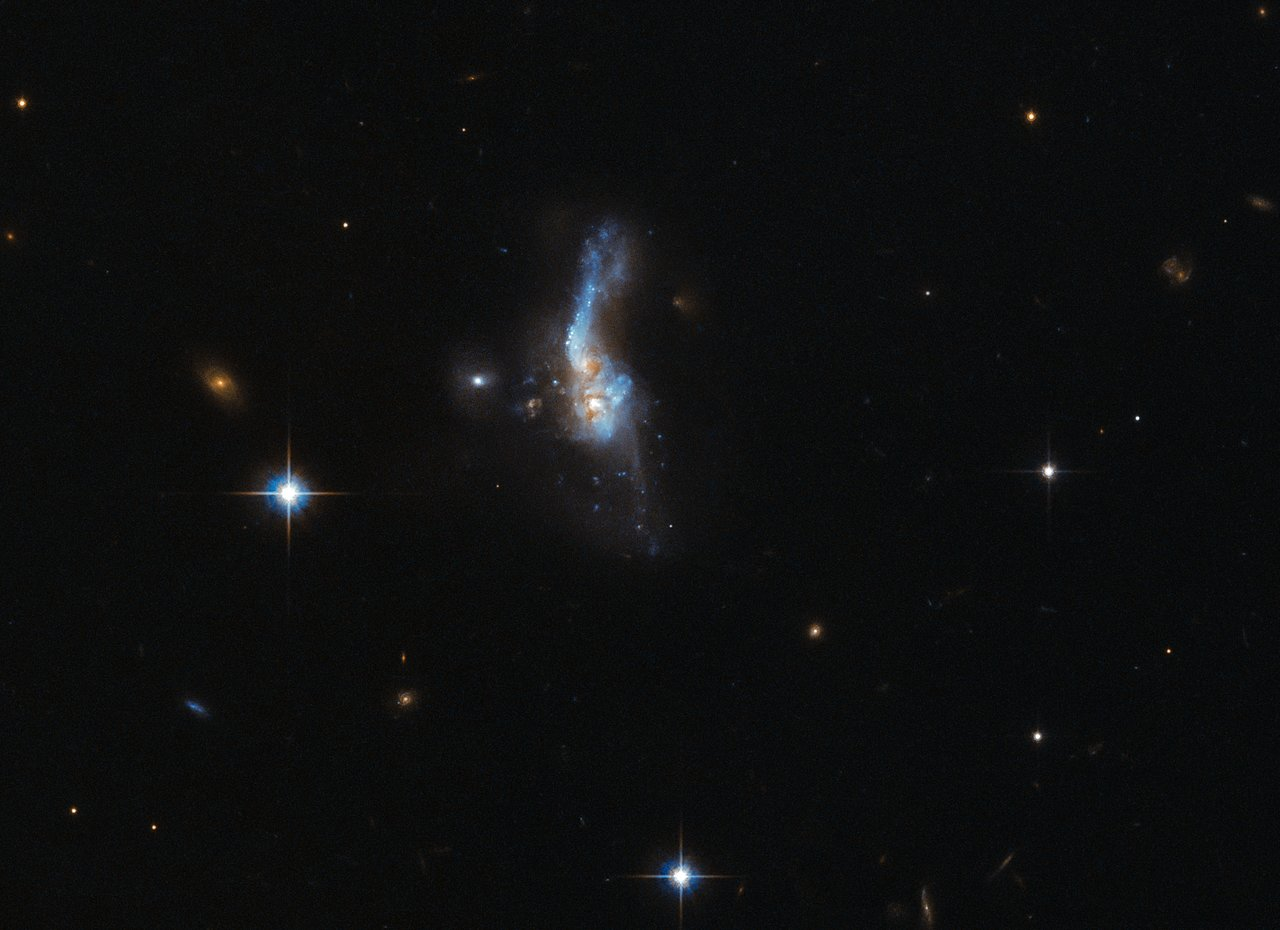
IRAS 14348-1447 is an ultraluminous infrared galaxy, located over a billion light-years away.

LIRGs are also capable of becoming Ultra Luminous Infrared Galaxies (ULIRGs) but not all LIRGs become ULIRGs, thus there is no clear time scale at which this happens. Studies have shown that ULIRGs are more likely to contain an AGN than LIRGs

According to one study a ULIRG is just part of an evolutionary galaxy merger scenario. In essence, two or more spiral galaxies, galaxies that consist of a flat, rotating disk containing stars, gas and dust and a central concentration of stars known as the bulge, merge to form an early stage merger. An early stage merger in this case can also be identified as a LIRG. After that, it becomes a late stage merger, which is a ULIRG. It then becomes a quasar and in the final stage of the evolution it becomes an elliptical galaxy. This can be evidenced by the fact that stars are much older in elliptical galaxies than those found in the earlier stages of the evolution.

== HyLIRG ==
Hyper luminous Infrared Galaxies (HyLIRG), also referred to as HiLIRGs and HLIRGs, are considered to be some of the most luminous persistent objects in the Universe, exhibiting extremely high star formation rates, and most of which are known to harbour Active Galactic Nuclei (AGN). They are defined as galaxies with luminosities above 10^{13} L_{☉}, as distinct from the less luminous population of ULIRGs (L = 10^{12} – 10^{13} L_{☉}). HLIRGs were first identified through follow-up observations of the IRAS mission.

IRAS F10214+4724, a HyLIRG being gravitationally lensed by a foreground elliptical galaxy, was considered to be one of the most luminous objects in the Universe having an intrinsic luminosity of ~ 2 × 10^{13} L_{☉}. It is believed that the bolometric luminosity of this HLIRG is likely amplified by a factor of ~30 as a result of the gravitational lensing.

The majority (~80%) of the mid-infrared spectrum of these objects is found to be dominated by AGN emission. However, the starburst (SB) activity is known to be significant in all known sources with a mean SB contribution of ~30%. Star formation rates in HLIRGs have been shown to reach ~ 3×10^{2} – 3×10^{3} M_{☉} yr^{−1}.

== ELIRG ==
The Extremely Luminous Infrared Galaxy WISE J224607.57-052635.0, with a luminosity of 300 trillion suns was discovered by NASA's Wide-field Infrared Survey Explorer (WISE), and as of May 2015 is the most luminous galaxy found. The galaxy belongs to a new class of objects discovered by WISE, extremely luminous infrared galaxies, or ELIRGs.

Light from the WISE J224607.57-052635.0 galaxy has traveled 12.5 billion years. The black hole at its center was billions of times the mass of the Sun when the universe was a tenth (1.3 billion years) of its present age of 13.8 billion years.

There are three reasons the black holes in the ELIRGs could be massive. First, the embryonic black holes might be bigger than thought possible. Second, the Eddington limit was exceeded. When a black hole feeds, gas falls in and heats, emitting light. The pressure of the emitted light forces the gas outward, creating a limit to how fast the black hole can continuously absorb matter. If a black hole broke this limit, it could theoretically increase in size at a fast rate. Black holes have previously been observed breaking this limit; the black hole in the study would have had to repeatedly break the limit to grow this large. Third, the black holes might just be bending this limit, absorbing gas faster than thought possible, if the black hole is not spinning fast. If a black hole spins slowly, it will not repel its gas absorption as much. A slow-spinning black hole can absorb more matter than a fast-spinning black hole. The massive black holes in ELIRGs could be absorbing matter for a longer time.

Twenty new ELIRGs, including the most luminous galaxy found to date, have been discovered. These galaxies were not found earlier because of their distance, and because dust converts their visible light into infrared light. One has been observed to have three star-forming areas.

== Observations ==
=== IRAS ===
The Infrared Astronomical Satellite (IRAS) was the first all-sky survey which used far-infrared wavelengths, in 1983. In that survey, tens of thousands of galaxies were detected, many of which would not have been recorded in previous surveys. It is now clear that the reason the number of detections has risen is that the majority of LIRGs in the universe emitted the bulk of their energy in the far infrared. Using the IRAS, scientists were able to determine the luminosity of the galactic objects discovered. The telescope was a joint project of the United States (NASA), Netherlands (NIVR), and the United Kingdom (SERC). Over 250,000 infrared sources were observed during this 10-month mission.

=== GOALS ===
The Great Observatories All-sky LIRG Survey (GOALS) is a multi-wavelength study of luminous infrared galaxies, incorporating observations with NASA's Great Observatories and other ground and space-based telescopes. Using information from NASA's Spitzer, Hubble, Chandra and Galex observations in a study over 200 of the most luminous infrared selected galaxies in the local universe. Approximately 180 LIRGs were identified along with over 20 ULIRGs. The LIRGs and ULIRGs targeted in GOALS span the full range of nuclear spectral types (type-1 and type 2 Active Galactic Nuclei, LINERS's, and starbursts) and interaction stages (major mergers, minor mergers, and isolated galaxies).

== List ==
Some examples of notable LIRGs, ULIRGs, HyLIRGs, ELIRGs.

Galaxy	Type	Luminosity	Constellation	RA	DEC	Notes
WISE J224607.57-052635.0	ELIRG		Aquarius	22^{h} 46^{m} 07.57^{s}	−05° 26′ 35.0″	Discovered in 2015, the most luminous galaxy known, as of 2015
Arp 220	ULIRG	$L_{IR}=10^{12.28} L_{\odot}$	Serpens	15^{h} 34^{m} 57.2^{s}	+23° 30′ 11.0″	the closest ULIRG, it is in the process of merging two galaxies.
Markarian 231	ULIRG	$L_{IR}=10^{12.57} L_{\odot}$	Ursa Major	12^{h} 56^{m} 14.2^{s}	+56° 52′ 25″	Late-stage galaxy merger, contains a quasar
Markarian 273	ULIRG	$L_{IR}=10^{12.21} L_{\odot}$	Ursa Major	13^{h} 44^{m} 42.1^{s}	+55° 53′ 13″	a well studied nearby ultraluminous infrared galaxy merger.
NGC 3690	LIRG	$L_{IR}=10^{11.93} L_{\odot}$	Ursa Major	11^{h} 28^{m} 32.3^{s}	+58° 33′ 43″	Mid-stage multi-galaxy major merger.
II Zw 96 / IRAS 20550+1656	LIRG	$L_{IR}=10^{11.94} L_{\odot}$	Delphinus	20^{h} 57^{m} 23.9^{s}	+17° 07′ 39″	Two- or three- galaxy merging system extensively studied across the electromagnetic spectrum. One of the first galaxies to be observed with the James Webb Space Telescope.
NGC 3256	LIRG	$L_{IR}=10^{11.64} L_{\odot}$	Vela			Most luminous galaxy in infrared within z<0,01. Two nucleus system, but only one is visible at optical wavelengths: the southern nucleus is too obscured by gas and dust and only becomes visible in the infrared. NGC 3256 was one of the first galaxies to be observed by the James Webb Space Telescope.
NGC 1068	LIRG	$L_{IR}=10^{11.40} L_{\odot}$	Cetus			Seyfert galaxy
NGC 1275	LIRG	$L_{IR}=10^{11.26} L_{\odot}$	Perseus			radio galaxy, central galaxy of Perseus Cluster
NGC 1365	LIRG	$L_{IR}=10^{11.00} L_{\odot}$	Fornax			Non-merger low luminosity LIRG, barred spiral galaxy
NGC 1614	LIRG	$L_{IR}=10^{11.65} L_{\odot}$	Eridanus			Late-stage merger galaxy undergoing minor merger
NGC 2146	LIRG	$L_{IR}=10^{11.12} L_{\odot}$	Camelopardalis			Non-merger LIRG
NGC 2623	LIRG	$L_{IR}=10^{11.60} L_{\odot}$	Cancer			Late-stage galaxy merger
NGC 6090	LIRG	$L_{IR}=10^{11.58} L_{\odot}$	Draco			Mid-stage galaxy merger.
NGC 6240	LIRG	$L_{IR}=10^{11.93} L_{\odot}$	Ophiuchus			a well studied nearby infrared galaxy
NGC 7469	LIRG	$L_{IR}=10^{11.65} L_{\odot}$	Pegasus			Two-galaxy merging system with starburst nuclear ring, one of the first galaxies observed with the James Webb Space Telescope.
NGC 7674	LIRG	$L_{IR}=10^{11.56} L_{\odot}$	Pegasus			
UGC 5101	ULIRG	$L_{IR}=10^{12.01} L_{\odot}$	Ursa Major			Late-stage galaxy merger
IRAS 09104+4109	HyLIRG	$L_{IR}=10^{} L_{\odot}$	Lynx			Seyfert galaxy and quasar

== Image gallery ==
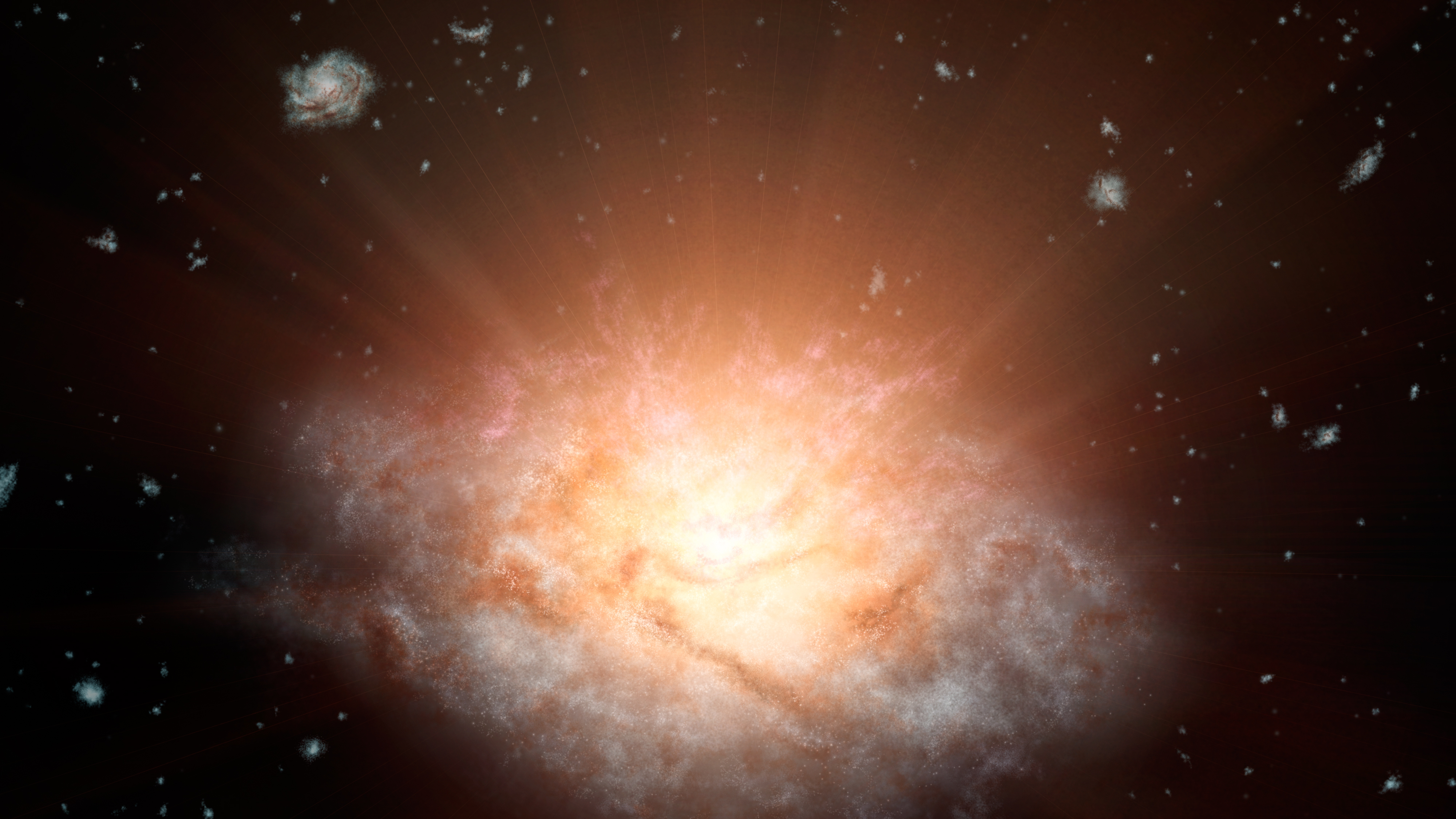
WISE J224607.57-052635.0 is the most luminous galaxy in the universe (artist's impression).

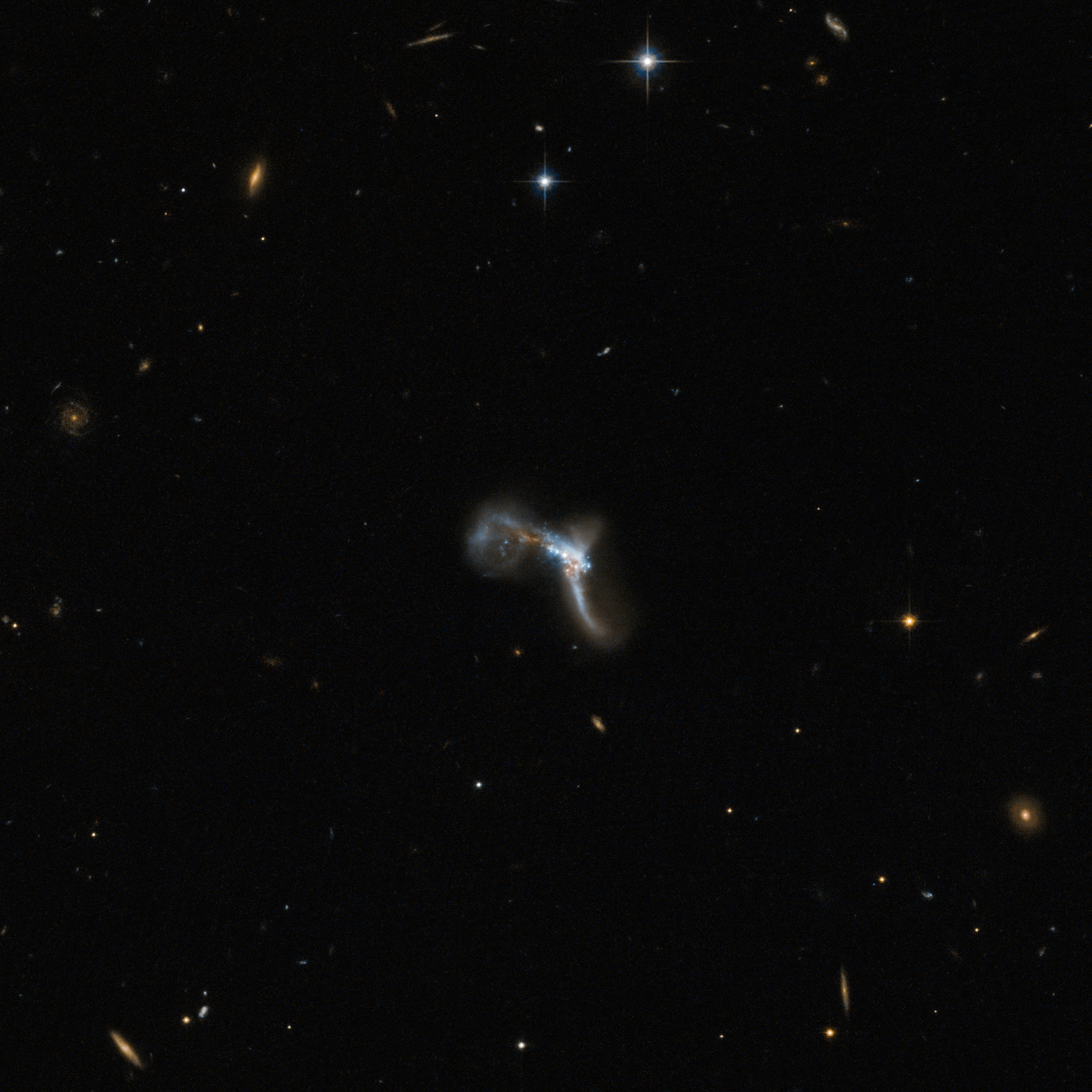
South America Galaxy taken by the Hubble Space Telescope

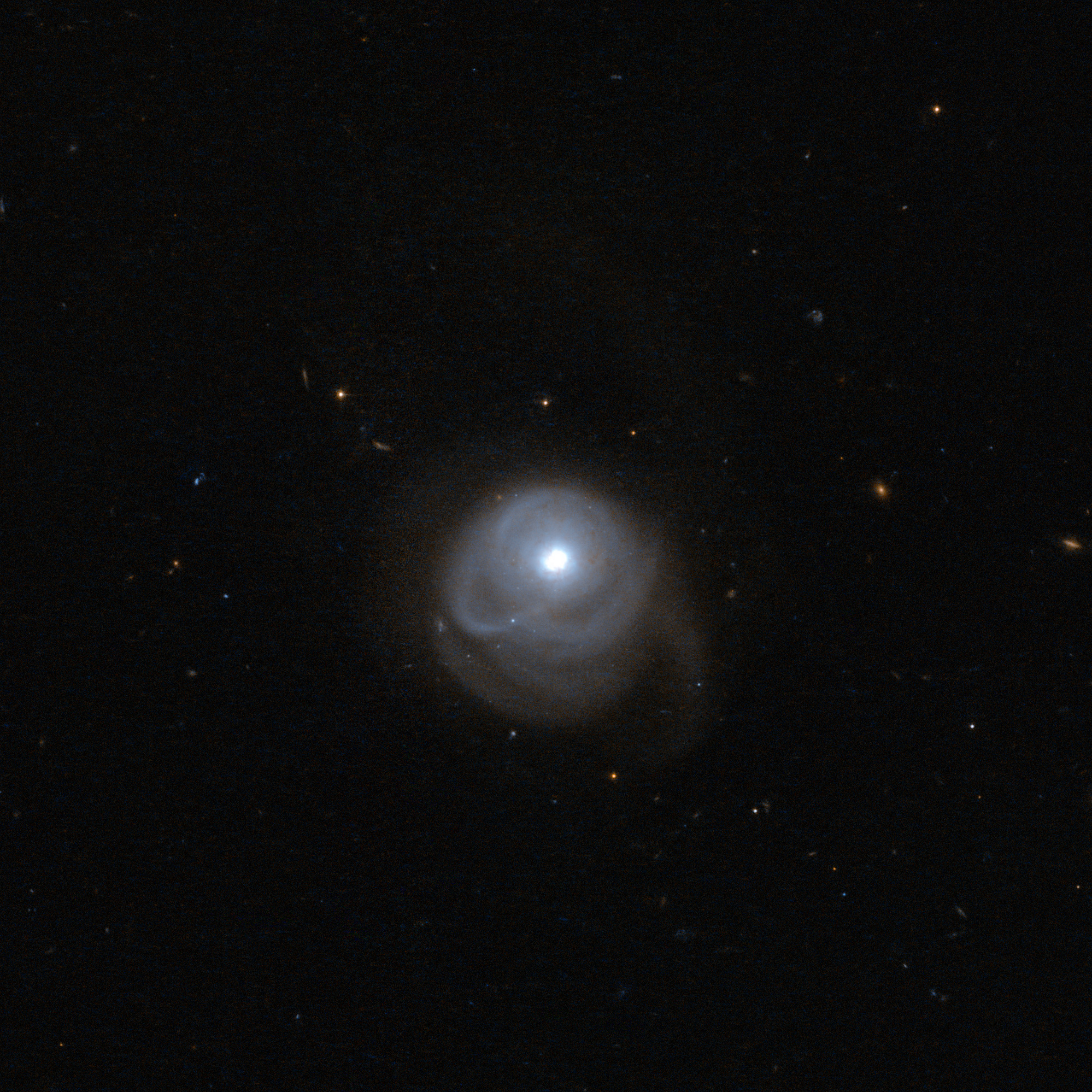
2MASX J05210136-2521450.

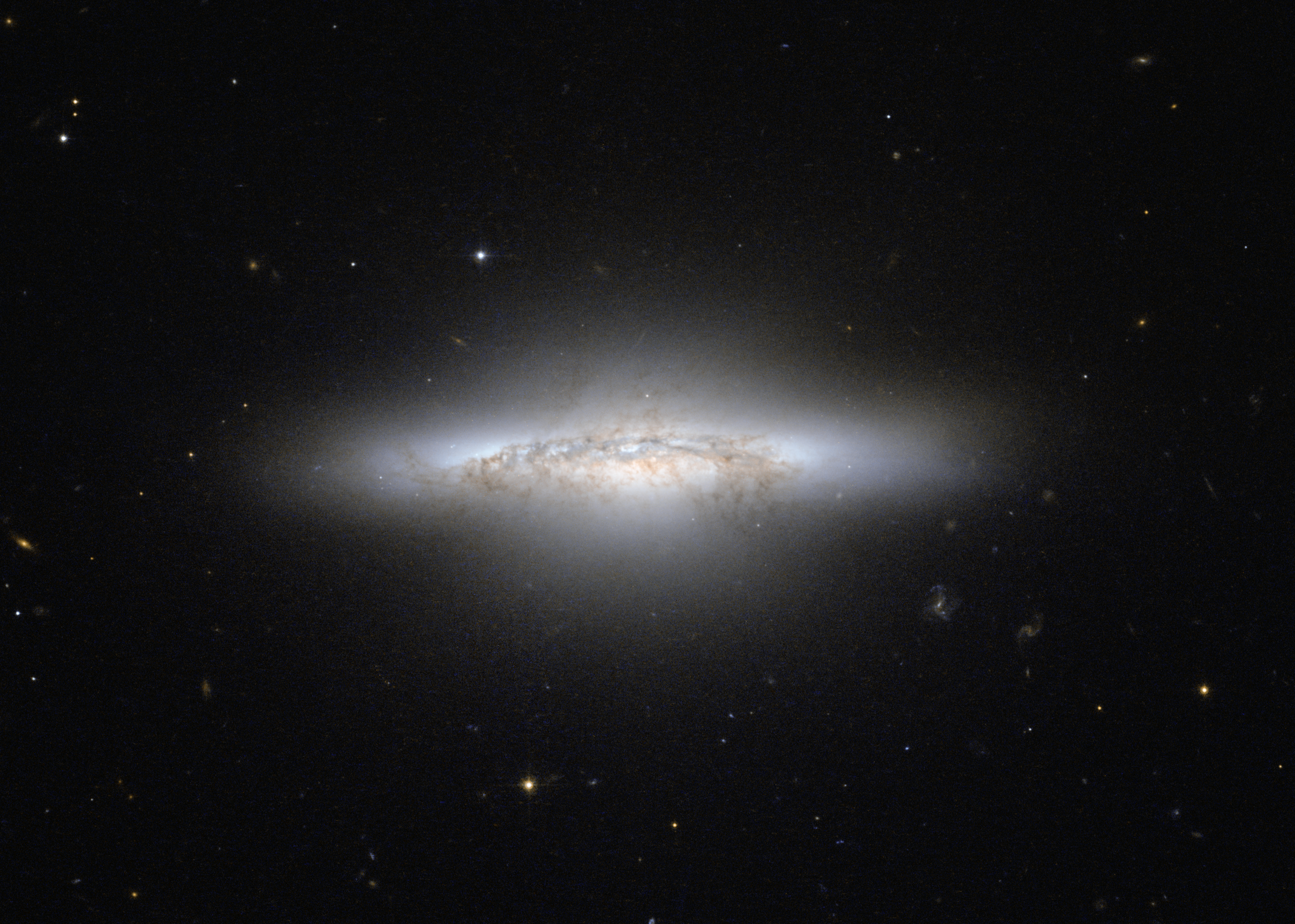
Luminous infrared galaxy NGC 5010.

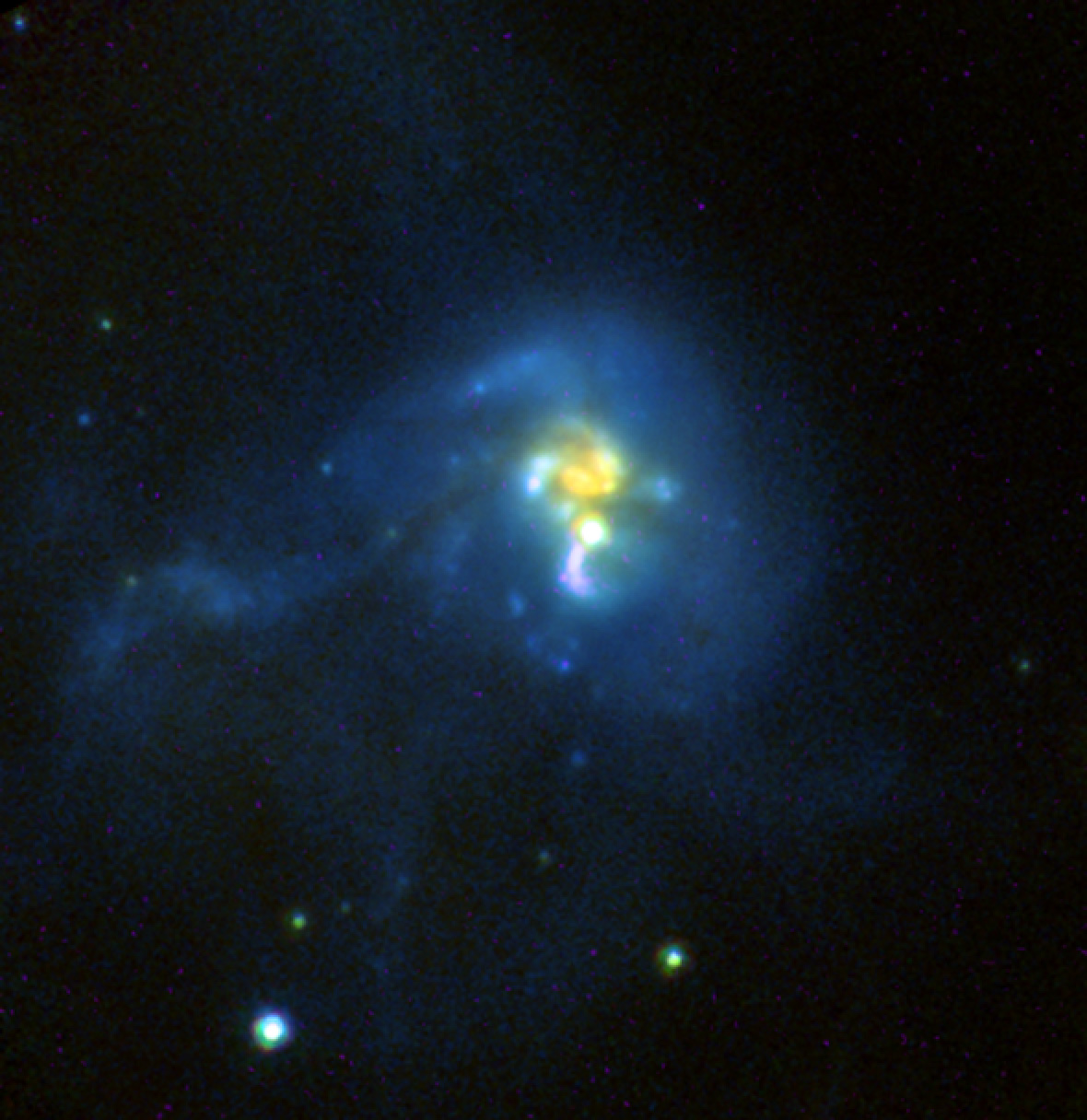
Ultraluminous Infrared Galaxy IRAS 19297-0406

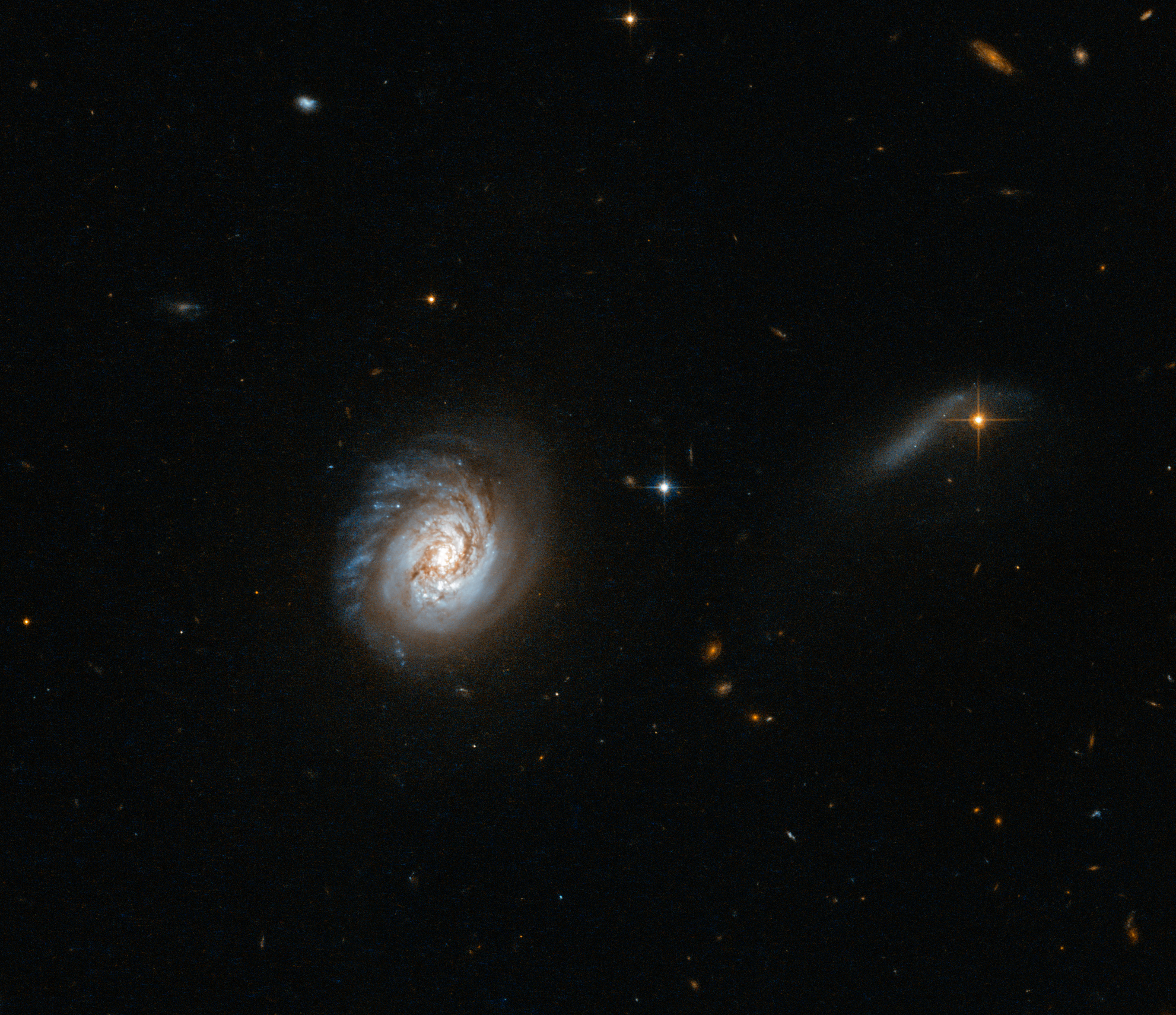
Luminous infrared galaxy MCG-03-04-014
