= Starburst galaxy =

Galaxy undergoing an exceptionally high rate of star formation

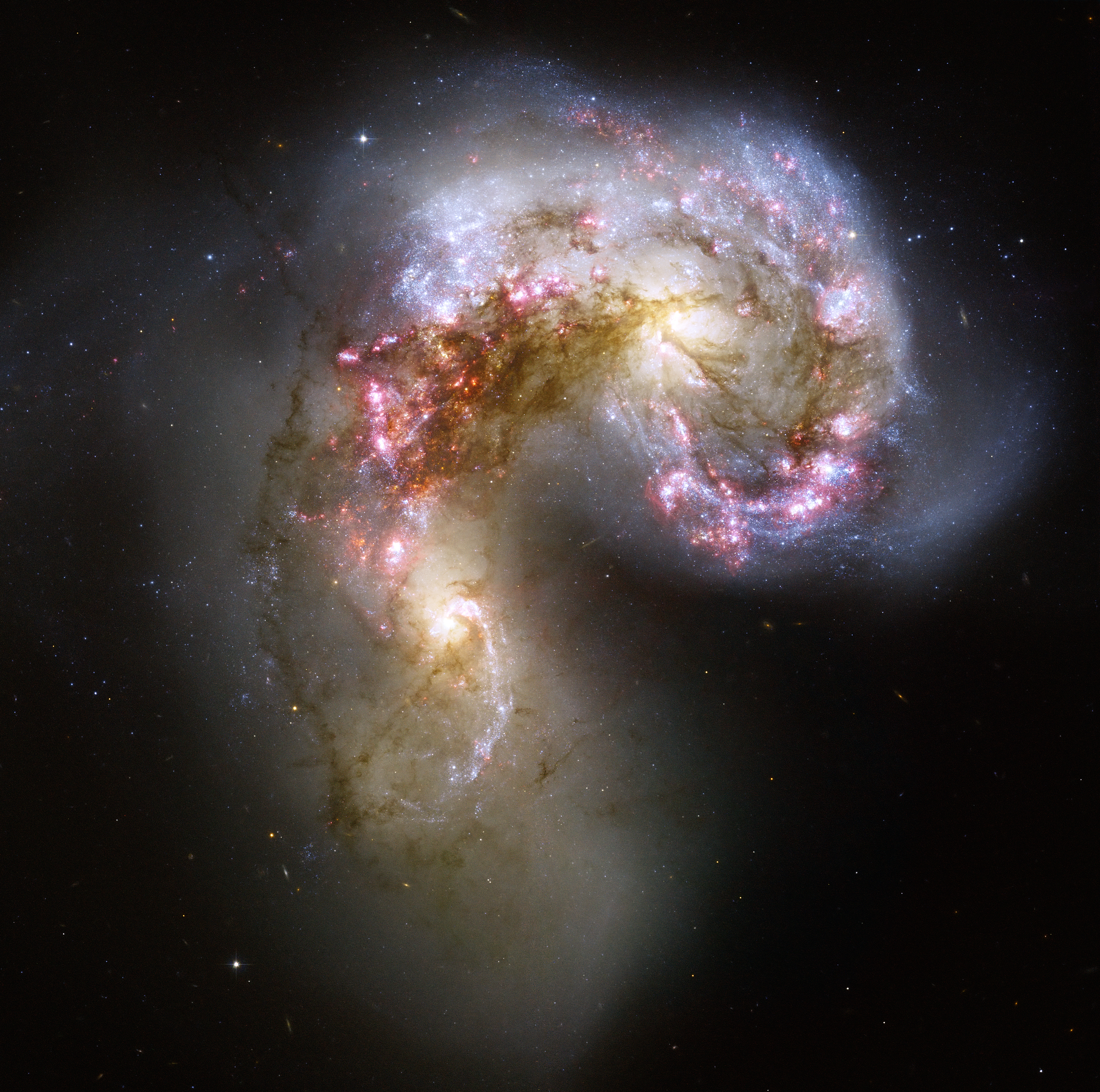
The Antennae Galaxies are an example of a starburst galaxy occurring from the collision of NGC 4038/NGC 4039. Credit: NASA/ESA.

A starburst galaxy is one undergoing an exceptionally high rate of star formation, as compared to the long-term average rate of star formation in the galaxy, or the star formation rate observed in most other galaxies.

For example, the star formation rate of the Milky Way galaxy is approximately 3 M_{☉}/yr, while starburst galaxies can experience star formation rates of 100 M_{☉}/yr or more. While many main-sequence galaxies use up their molecular gas reservoir in 1-2 Gyr, the high rate of star formation in starbursts can deplete all of their star-forming material in scales of 0.1 Gyr - much shorter than the age of the galaxy. As such, the starburst nature of a galaxy is a phase, and one that typically occupies a brief period of a galaxy's evolution. The majority of starburst galaxies are in the midst of a merger or close encounter with another galaxy. Starburst galaxies include M82, NGC 4038/NGC 4039 (the Antennae Galaxies), and IC 10.

== Definition ==
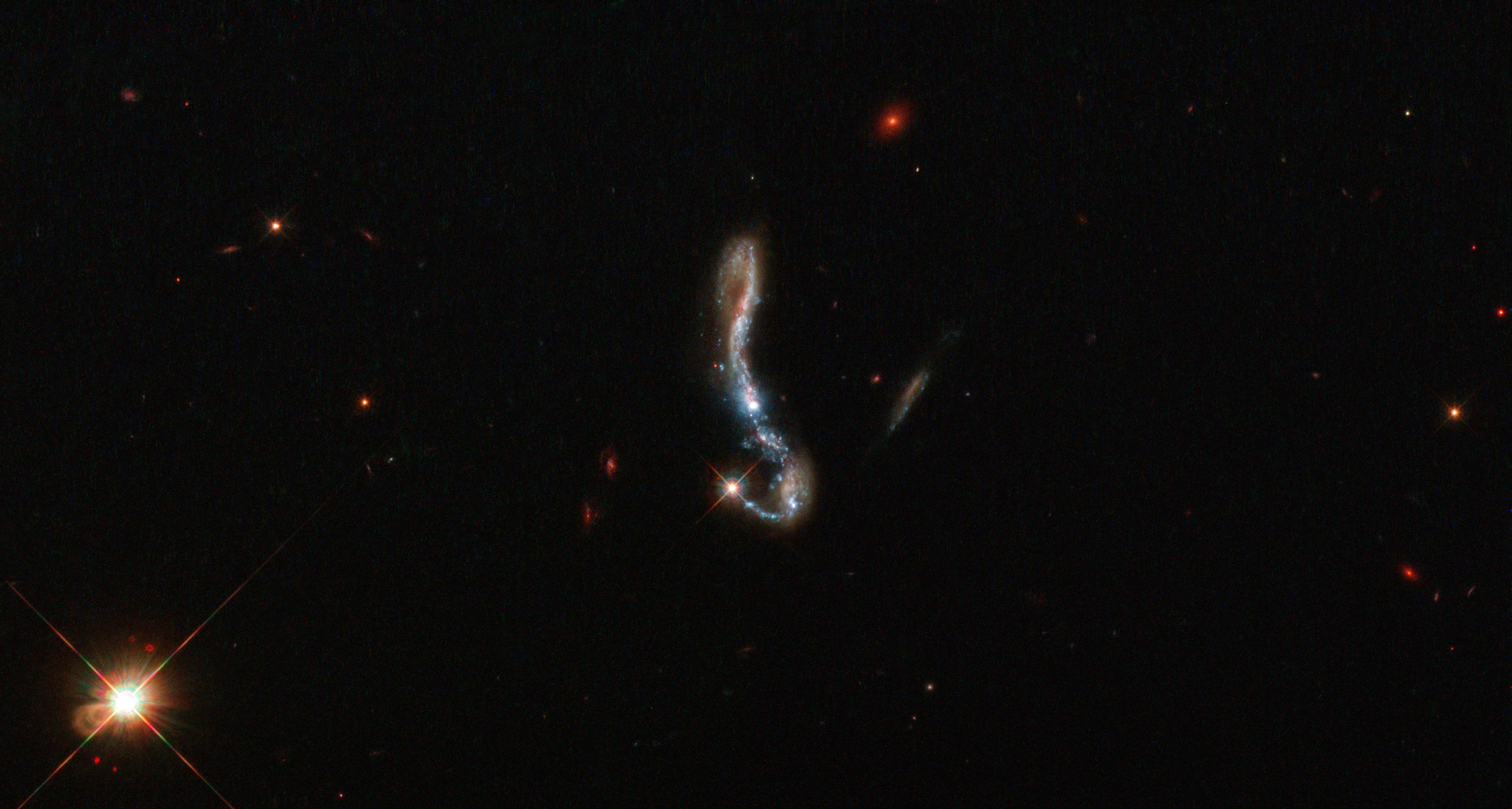
Light and dust in a nearby starburst galaxy known as 2MASS J082354.96+280621.6

Starburst galaxies are defined by these three interrelated factors:

1. The rate at which the galaxy is currently converting gas into stars (the star-formation rate, or SFR).
2. The available quantity of gas from which stars can be formed.
3. A comparison of the timescale on which star formation consumes the available gas with the age or rotation period of the galaxy.

Commonly used definitions include:

- Continued star-formation where the current SFR would exhaust the available gas reservoir in much less time than the age of the Universe (the Hubble Time).
- Continued star-formation where the current SFR would exhaust the available gas reservoir in much less time than the dynamical timescale of the galaxy (perhaps one rotation period in a disk type galaxy).
- The current SFR, normalized by the past-averaged SFR, is much greater than unity. This ratio is referred to as the "birthrate parameter" b. Generally, a birthrate parameter ≥ 3 is used as the cutoff for starbursts.

The specific amount of contribution of starbursts to star formation is inconsistent across studies (partially due to inconsistencies in definitions of starbursts) but generally insignificant across all epochs - though some sources indicate a very high contribution at cosmic noon. In the local universe, starburst galaxies make up ~1% of all star-forming galaxies, and ~3-6% of all star formation; though identification of starbursts compared to AGNs due to both of their high luminosities can lead to some error. Generally, the fraction of starbursts increases with redshift, and increases for galaxies with lower initial mass functions. While some studies indicate a large starburst population at z ~ 5 (15% for galaxies with mass > $10^{9.2} M_{\bigodot}$), this may be an overestimation.

=== Triggering mechanisms ===
Starbursts are triggered by processes that cause density surges in galaxies - usually mergers, gravitational disruptions, and stellar bar gas accumulation. A large portion of starbursts are caused by same or different mass mergers. Galaxies in the midst of a starburst frequently show tidal tails, an indication of a close encounter with another galaxy, or are in the midst of a merger. Tidal gravitation forces or direct collisions between gas clouds can cause dust and gas to lose angular momentum and fall inwards, and the compressed gas rapidly forms stars. The overall efficiency of converting gas to stars also increases. These changes in the rate of star formation also led to variations with depletion time, and power a starburst with its own galactic mechanisms rather than merging with another galaxy. Interactions between galaxies that do not merge can trigger unstable rotation modes, such as the bar instability, which causes gas to be funneled towards the nucleus and ignites bursts of star formation near the galactic nucleus. It has been shown that there is a strong correlation between the lopsidedness of a galaxy and the youth of its stellar population, with more lopsided galaxies having younger central stellar populations. As lopsidedness can be caused by tidal interactions and mergers between galaxies, this result gives further evidence that mergers and tidal interactions can induce central star formation in a galaxy and drive a starburst. At earlier cosmic epochs, when galaxies generally had higher gas content, mergers may have been less important in triggering starbursts, but the evidence is unclear. Additionally, the gas flows in the bars of spiral galaxies cause dust to accumulate towards the center of the galaxy, which can trigger starbursts in the centers of galaxies. This effect is most notable in galaxies with low redshifts.

=== Types ===
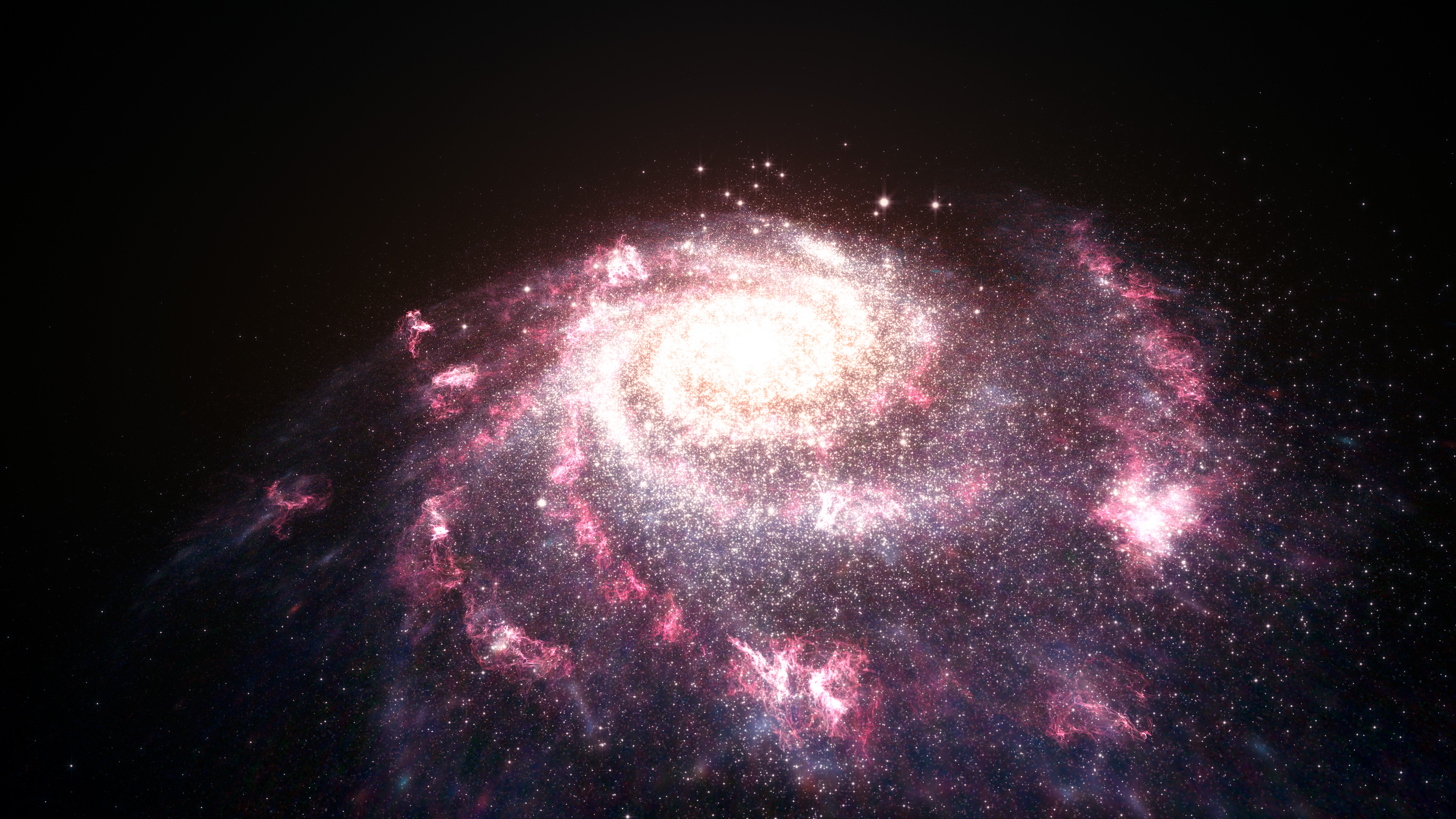
Artist's impression of a galaxy undergoing a starburst

Classifying types of starburst galaxies is difficult because starburst galaxies do not represent a specific type in and of themselves. Starbursts can occur in disk galaxies, and irregular galaxies often exhibit knots of starburst spread throughout the irregular galaxy. Nevertheless, astronomers typically classify starburst galaxies based on their most distinct observational characteristics. Some of the categorizations include:

- Blue compact galaxies (BCGs). These galaxies are often low mass, low metallicity, dust-free objects. Because they are dust-free and contain a large number of hot, young stars, they are often blue in optical and ultraviolet colours. It was initially thought that BCGs were genuinely young galaxies in the process of forming their first generation of stars, thus explaining their low metal content. However, old stellar populations have been found in most BCGs, and it is thought that efficient mixing may explain the apparent lack of dust and metals. Most BCGs show signs of recent mergers and/or close interactions. Well-studied BCGs include IZw18 (the most metal poor galaxy known), ESO338-IG04, and Haro 11.
  - Blue compact dwarf galaxies (BCD galaxies) are small compact galaxies.
  - Green Pea galaxies (GPs) are small compact galaxies resembling primordial starbursts. They were found by citizen scientists taking part in the Galaxy Zoo project.
  - Blueberry galaxies (BBs) are dwarf starbursts that are low redshift counterparts of GPs and likely analogs of high redshift galaxies. While BBs have a low SFR, probably because of their youth and small masses, their sSFR is high and comparable to GPs.
- Luminous infrared galaxies (LIRGs). These galaxies are by definition extremely dusty objects with luminosities greater than 10^{10} L_{☉}. The ultraviolet radiation produced by the luminous young stars is absorbed by the dust and re-radiated in the infrared at wavelengths of around 100 micrometers. Dust absorbs blue and ultraviolet light better than red light, and this explains the extreme red colors associated with ULIRGs. Not all of the original UV radiation is necessarily produced purely by star formation, and some LIRGs are likely powered in part by active galactic nuclei (AGN).
  - Ultra-luminous Infrared Galaxies (ULIRGs). These are more extreme versions of LIRGs with luminosities greater than 10^{11} L_{☉}. X-ray observations of many ULIRGs that penetrate the dust suggest that many starburst galaxies are double-cored systems, lending support to the hypothesis that ULIRGs are powered by star-formation triggered by major mergers. One well-studied ULIRG is Arp 220.
  - Hyperluminous Infrared galaxies (HyLIRGs) are even more extreme versions with luminosities greater than 10^{12} L_{☉}.
  - Submillimeter galaxies (SMGs) are ULIRGs or HyLIRGs at redshift larger than 2. At these redshifts, the 100 micrometer infrared emission is observed at sub-millimeter wavelengths, making this wavelength range favorable for detecting distant ULIRGs.

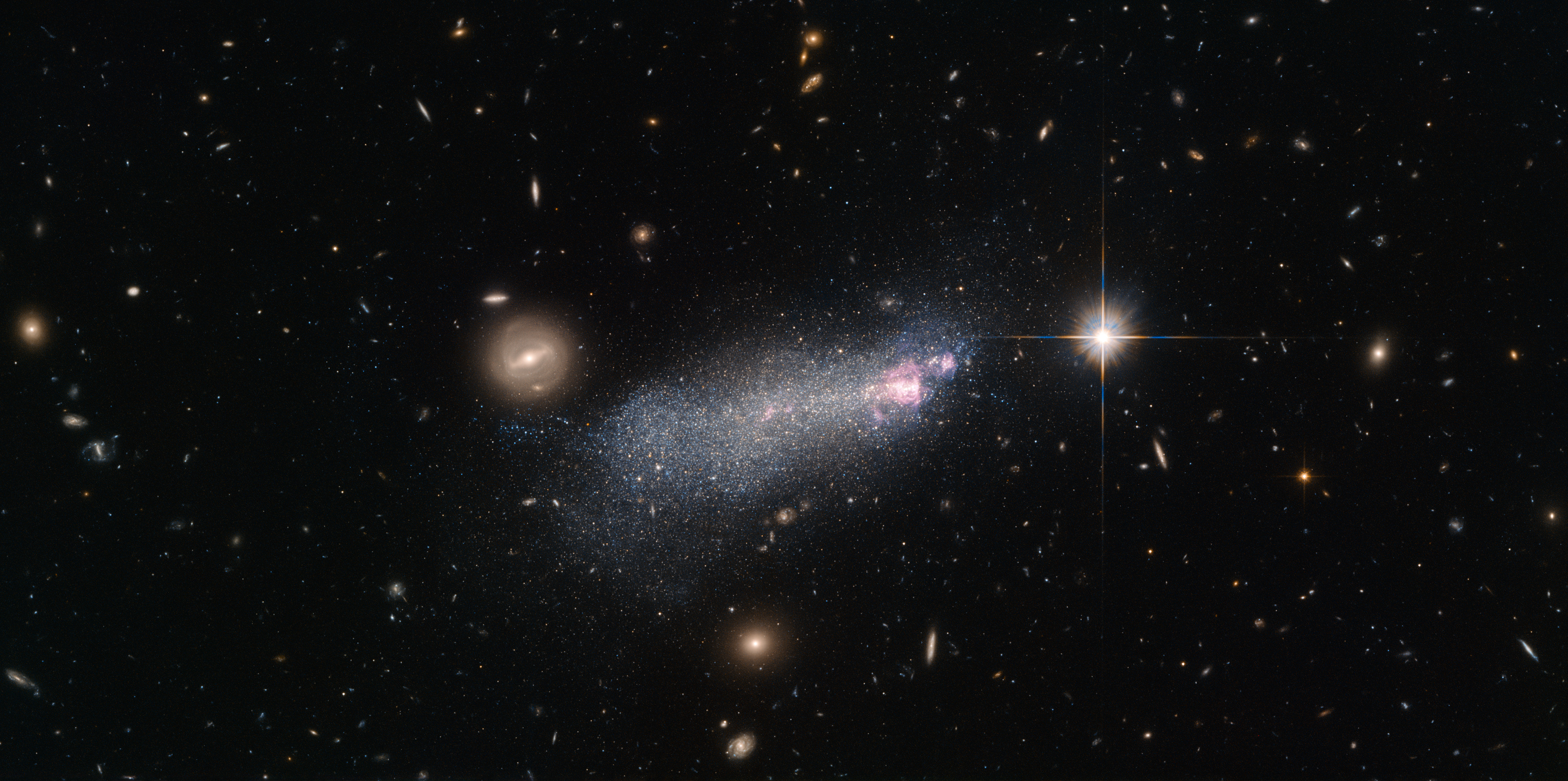
SBS 1415+437 is a WR galaxy located about 45 million light-years from Earth.

- Wolf–Rayet galaxies (WR galaxies), galaxies where a large proportion of the bright stars are Wolf–Rayet stars. The Wolf–Rayet phase is a relatively short-lived phase in the life of massive stars, typically 10% of the total life-time of these stars, and as such any galaxy is likely to contain few of these. However, because the stars are both luminous and have distinctive spectral features, it is possible to identify these stars in the spectra of entire galaxies, and doing so allows good constraints to be placed on the properties of the starbursts in these galaxies.

=== Ingredients ===
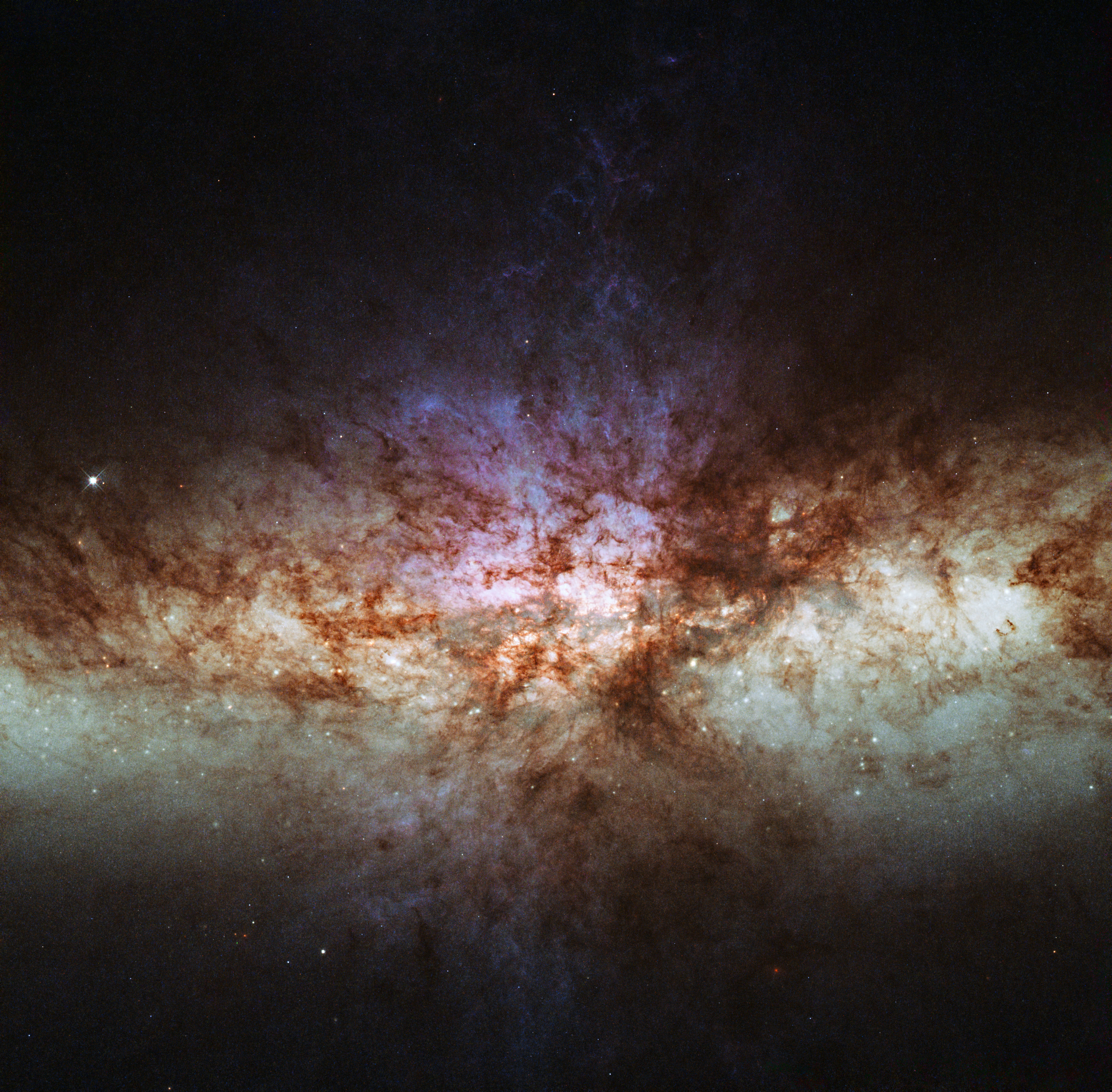
Messier 82 is the prototype nearby starburst galaxy about 12 million light-years away in the constellation Ursa Major.

First, a starburst galaxy must have a large supply of gas available to form stars. The burst itself may be triggered by a close encounter with another galaxy (such as M81/M82), a collision with another galaxy (such as the Antennae), or by another process that forces material into the center of the galaxy (such as a stellar bar).

The inside of the starburst is quite an extreme environment. The large amounts of gas mean that massive stars are formed. Young, hot stars ionize the gas (mainly hydrogen) around them, creating H II regions. Groups of hot stars are known as OB associations. These stars burn bright and fast, and are quite likely to explode at the end of their lives as supernovae.

After the supernova explosion, the ejected material expands and becomes a supernova remnant. These remnants interact with the surrounding environment within the starburst (the interstellar medium) and can be the site of naturally occurring masers.

Studying nearby starburst galaxies can help us determine the history of galaxy formation and evolution. Large numbers of the most distant galaxies seen, for example, in the Hubble Deep Field are known to be starbursts, but they are too far away to be studied in any detail. Observing nearby examples and exploring their characteristics can give us an idea of what was happening in the early universe as the light we see from these distant galaxies left them when the universe was much younger (see redshift).

== Examples ==
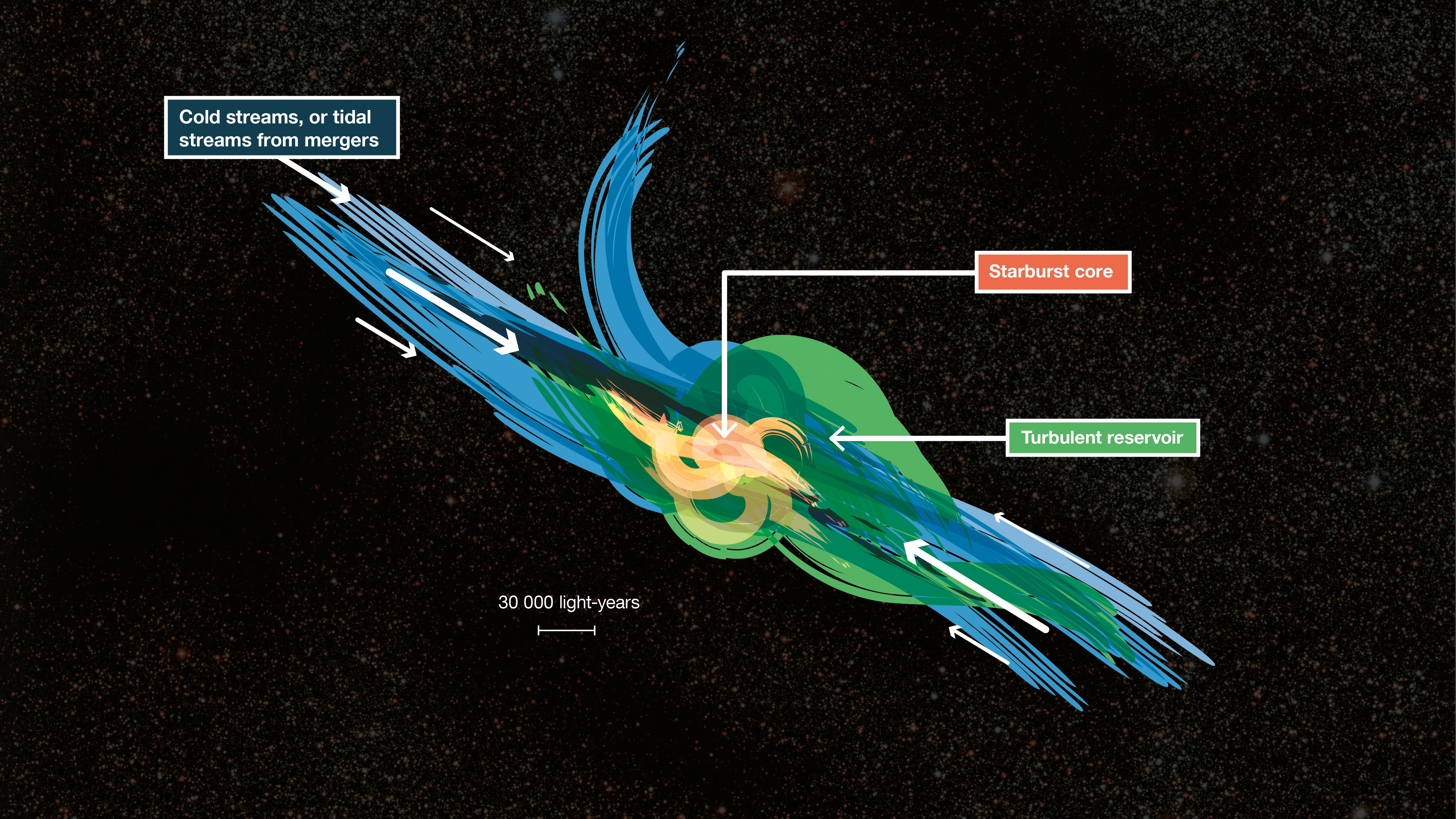
Artist's impression of gas fueling distant starburst galaxies

M82 is the archetypal starburst galaxy. Its high level of star formation is due to a close encounter with the nearby spiral M81. Maps of the regions made with radio telescopes show large streams of neutral hydrogen connecting the two galaxies, also as a result of the encounter. Radio images of the central regions of M82 also show a large number of young supernova remnants, left behind when the more massive stars created in the starburst came to the end of their lives. The Antennae is another starburst system, detailed by a Hubble picture, released in 1997.

== Post-Starburst ==
Starburst galaxies, as with all star-forming galaxies, can only form stars so long as they have fuel enough to do (see ingredients above). Starburst galaxies, due to the vigor of their star formation, can deplete their fuel in approximately an order of magnitude faster than regular star forming galaxies. Galaxies that have exhausted their star formation fuel and no longer show signs of star formation are known as quiescent or quenched galaxies; starburst galaxies that are quiescent/quenched are known as Post Starburst galaxies (PSB's). These PSB's are known to come about in part due to intense outflows of gas and dust caused by the resultant stellar winds of star formation. Recent survey's using the Atacama Large Millimeter/submillimeter Array (ALMA) show that intense magnetic fields in the starbursts also contribute to the strength of wind-outflow and the inevitable transition to a PSB.

PSB's are generally morphologically similar to other quiescent galaxies. Some findings suggest that PSB's are more spherical in nature than their quiescent counterparts and at moderate high star-forming redshifts (z~1.2) more compact. It is thought that these compact PSB's are the remnants of nuclear starbursts, or starbursts occurring as a result of gas losing angular momentum and cascading into the center of a galaxy at rates much faster than typical star-bursting galaxies.

== List of starburst galaxies ==
Galaxy	Type	Notes	Refs
Abell 2744 Y1	Irregular dwarf galaxy	A very distant galaxy, producing 10 times more stars than the Milky Way	
Antennae Galaxies	SB(s)m pec / SA(s)m pec	Two colliding galaxies	
Baby Boom Galaxy		Brightest starburst galaxy in the distant universe	
Centaurus A	E(p)	Nearest elliptical starburst galaxy	
Haro 11		Emits Lyman continuum photons	
HFLS3		Unusually large intense starburst galaxy	
HXMM01		Extreme starburst merging galaxies	
IC 10	dIrr	Mild starburst galaxy; nearest starburst galaxy and the only one in the Local Group.	
Kiso 5639		Also known as the 'Skyrocket Galaxy' due to its appearance	
Large Magellanic Cloud	SB(s)m	Being disrupted by the Milky Way	
M82	I0	Archetype starburst galaxy	
NGC 278	SAB(rs)b		
NGC 1309	SA(s)bc		
NGC 1569	IBm	Dwarf galaxy undergoing a galaxy-wide starburst	
NGC 1614	SB(s)c pec	Merging with another galaxy	
NGC 1705	SA0^{−} pec		
NGC 1792	SA(rs)bc	Potential recent tidal interaction with NGC 1808, causing measurable asymmety	
NGC 2146	SB(s)ab pec		
NGC 3125	S;BCDG		
NGC 3310	SAB(r)bc pec / SAcd		
NGC 4214	IAB(s)m		
NGC 4449	IBm		
NGC 4536	SAB(rs)b		
NGC 4631	SB(s)d	Also known as the Whale galaxy and Herring galaxy	
NGC 6946	SAB(rs)cd	Also known as the Fireworks galaxy for frequent supernovae	
SBS 1415+437	Blue compact dwarf galaxy	A dwarf galaxy containing a large number of Wolf–Rayet stars	
Sculptor Galaxy	SAB(s)c	Nearest large starburst galaxy	
MCG +07-33-027	Sa	Isolated; not in a galaxy cluster	

== Gallery ==
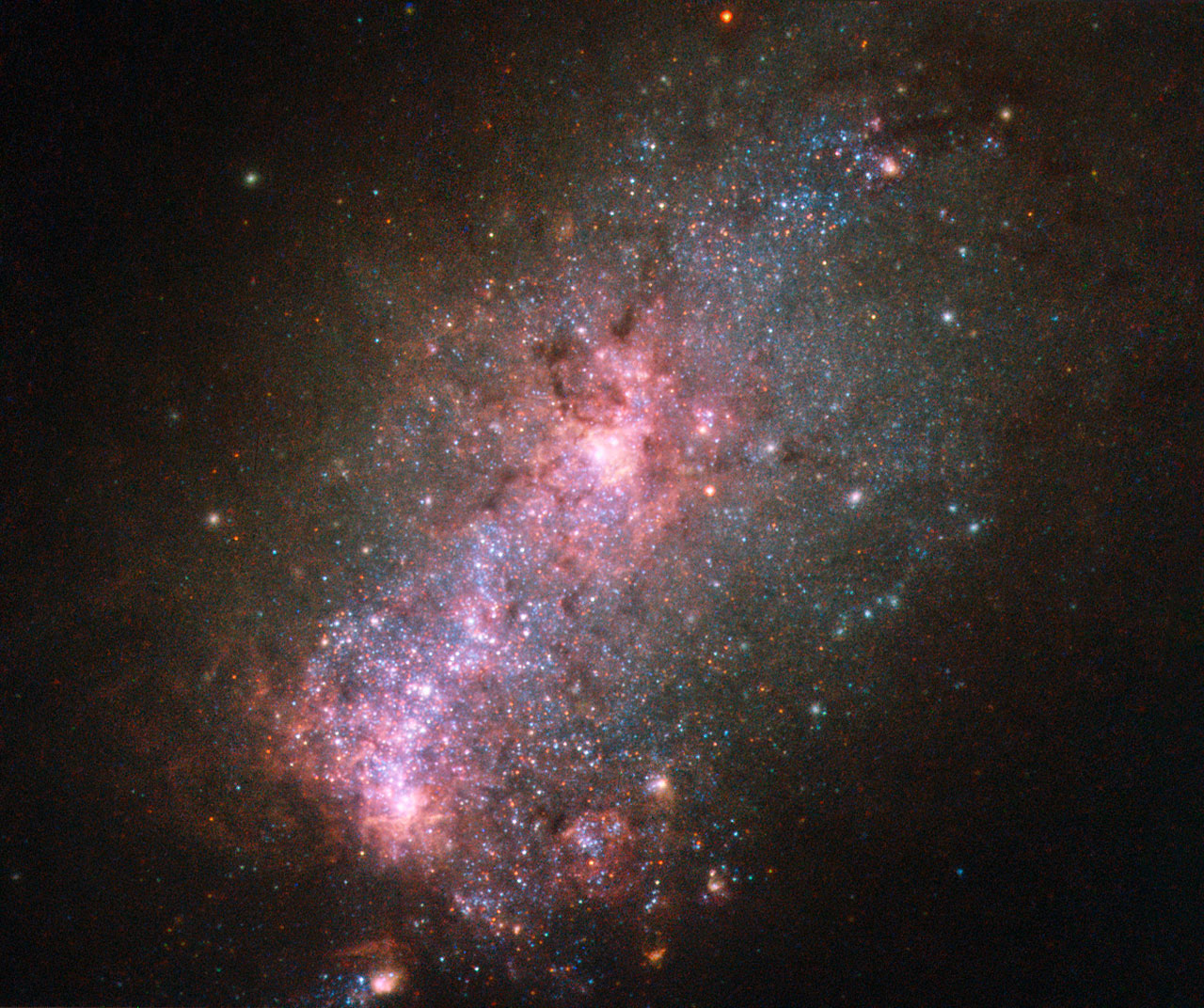
In NGC 3125 unusually high numbers of new stars forming occurs.

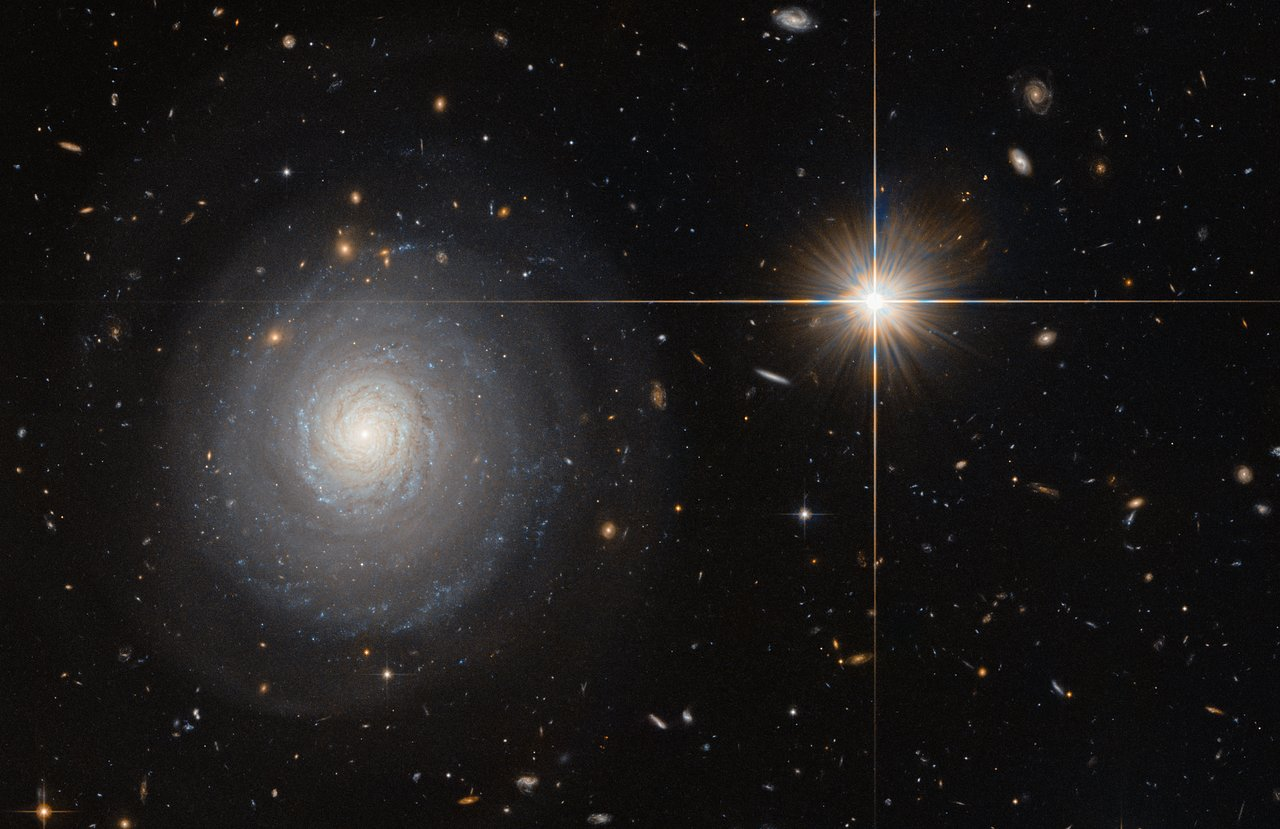
Starburst galaxy MCG+07-33-027.

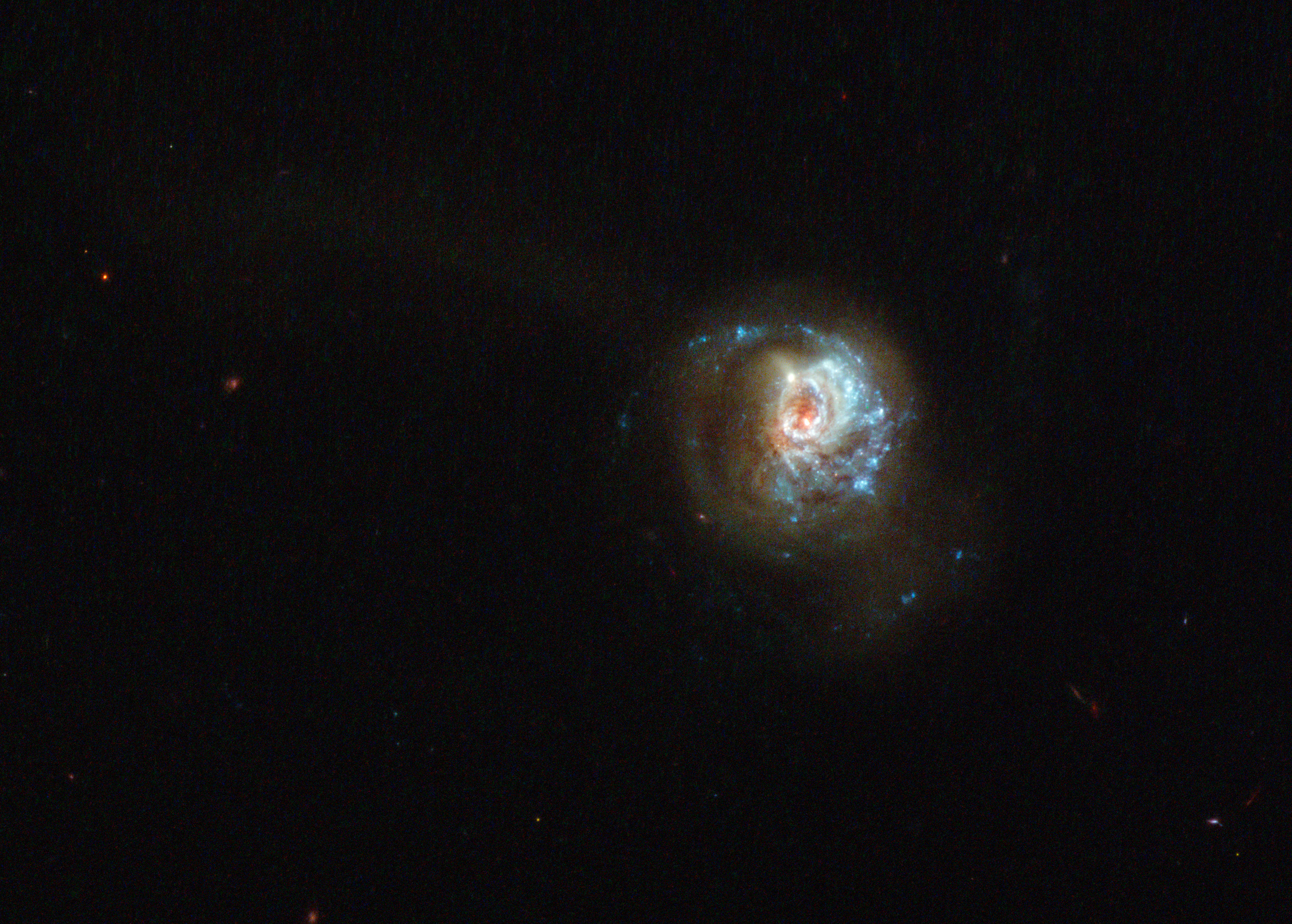
J125013.50+073441.5 taken by Hubble as part of a study named LARS (Lyman Alpha Reference Sample)

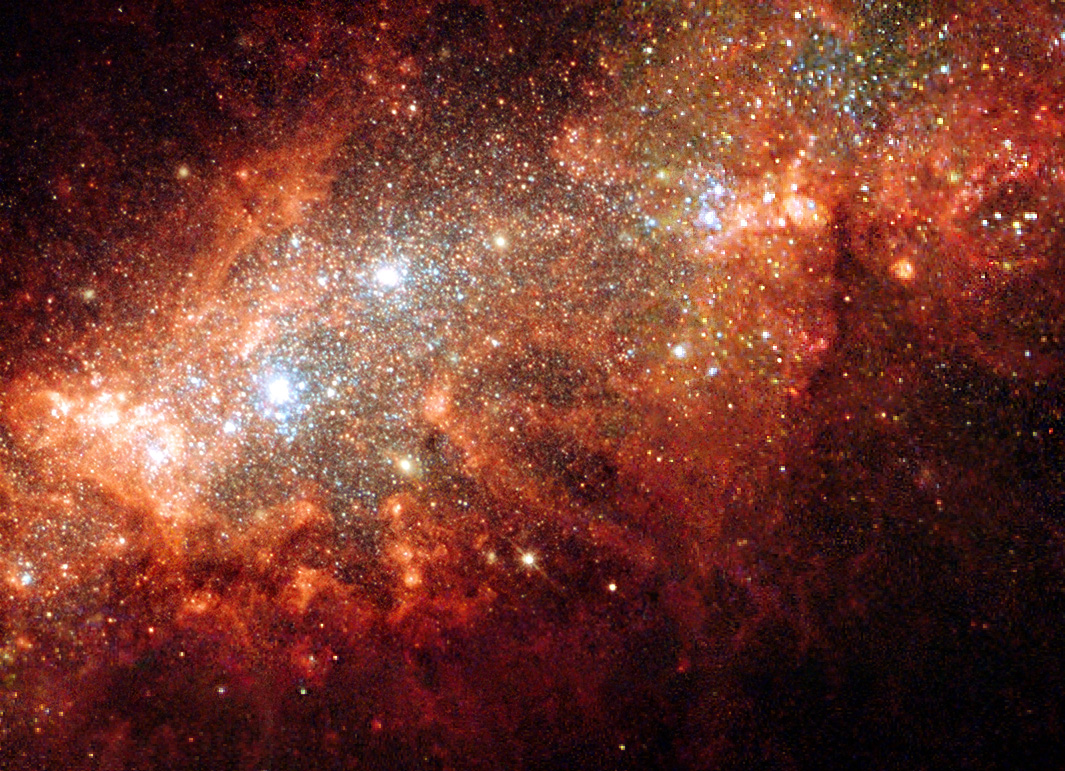
Starburst activity in the central region of nearby dwarf galaxy NGC 1569 (Arp 210). Taken by Hubble Space Telescope.

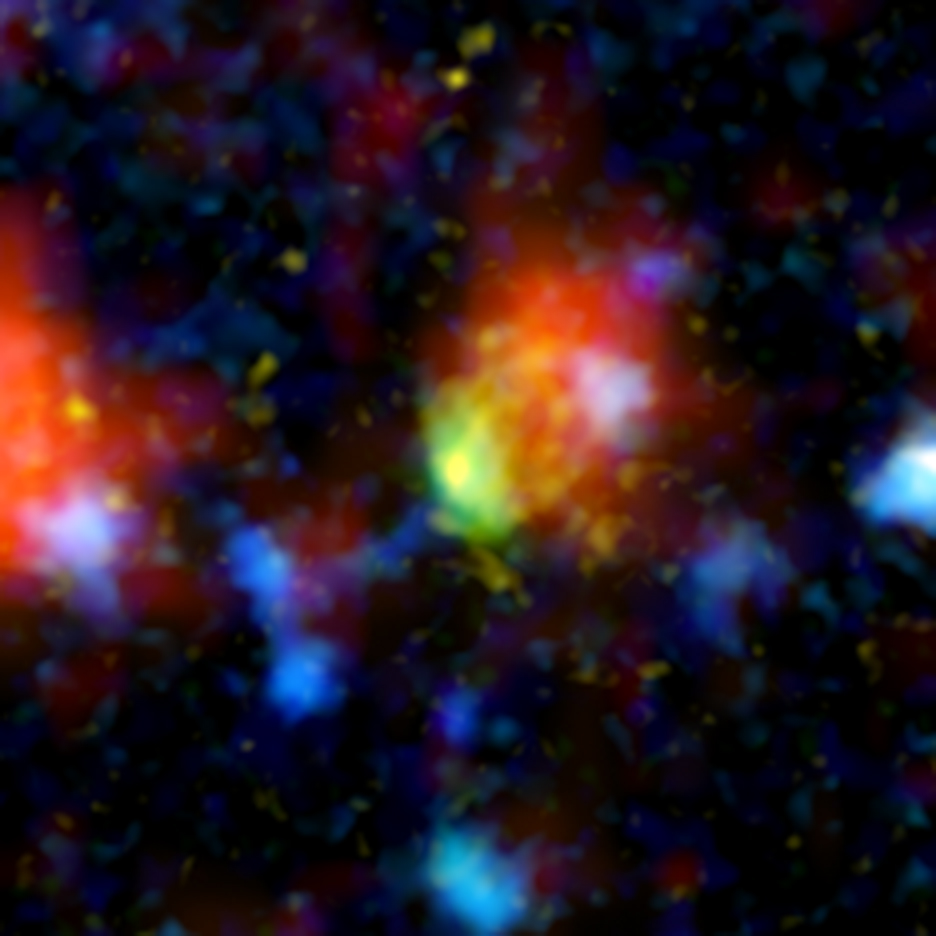
As viewed from our position 12.2 billion light years away, the Baby Boom Galaxy is seen to be creating 4,000 stars per year. Credit: NASA.

The galaxy NGC 4449 is currently a global starburst, with star formation activity widespread throughout the galaxy.

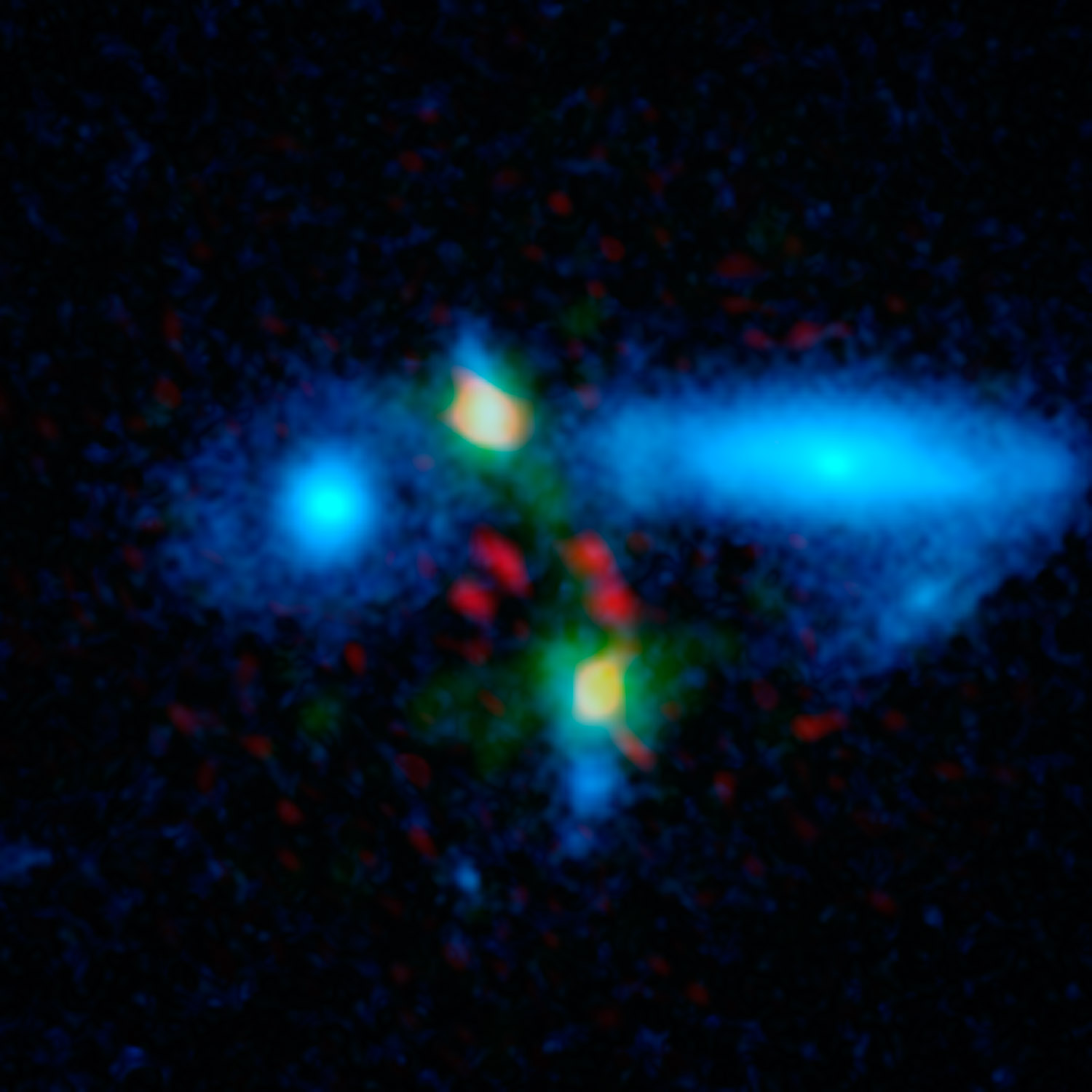
Explosive star formation in the currently merging galaxy HXMM01 11 billion light years away. Captured by NASA.

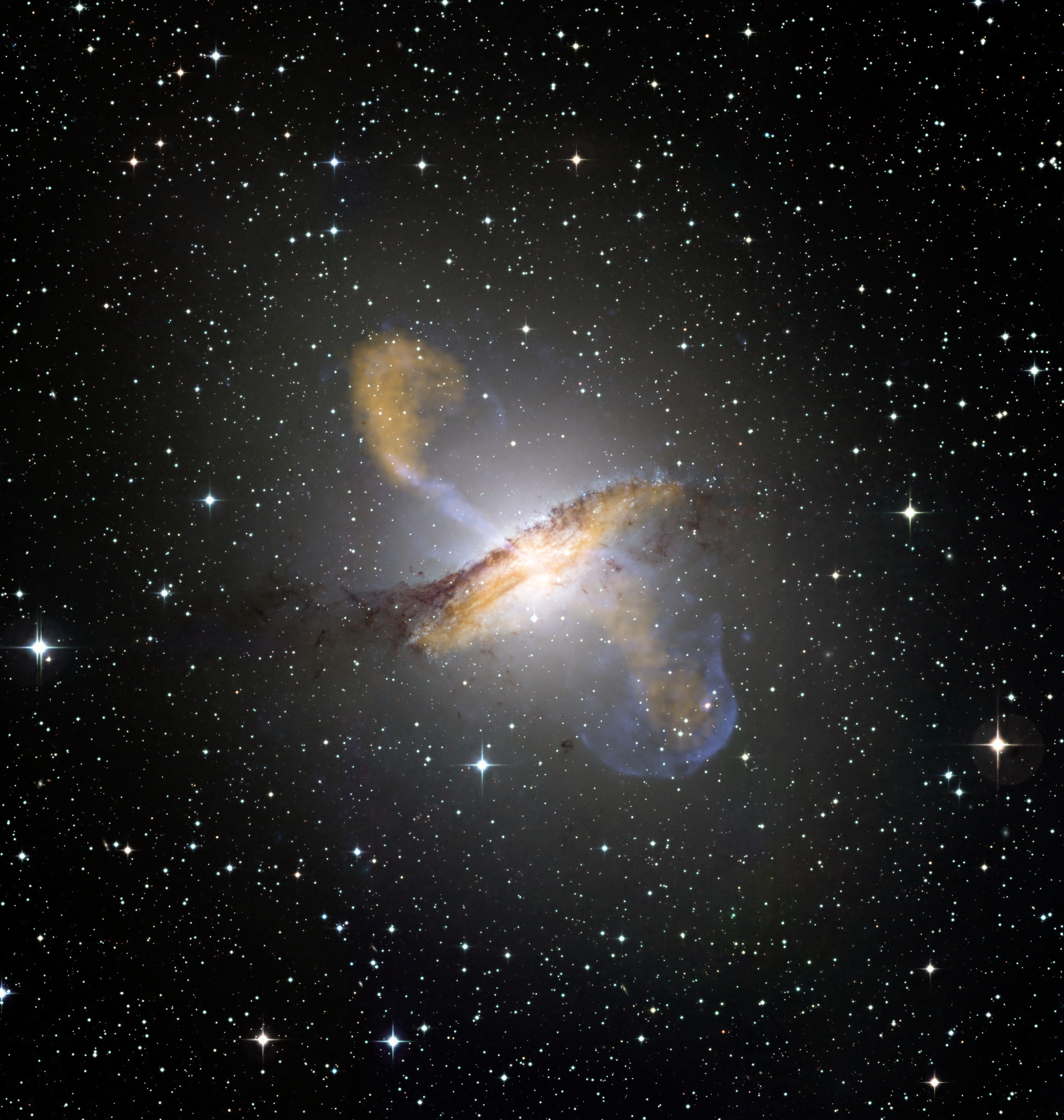
An image of the galaxy Centaurus A made by combining images from the MPG/ESO telescope, and the Chandra X-ray Observatory. It is the only known case of an "Elliptical Starburst" galaxy.

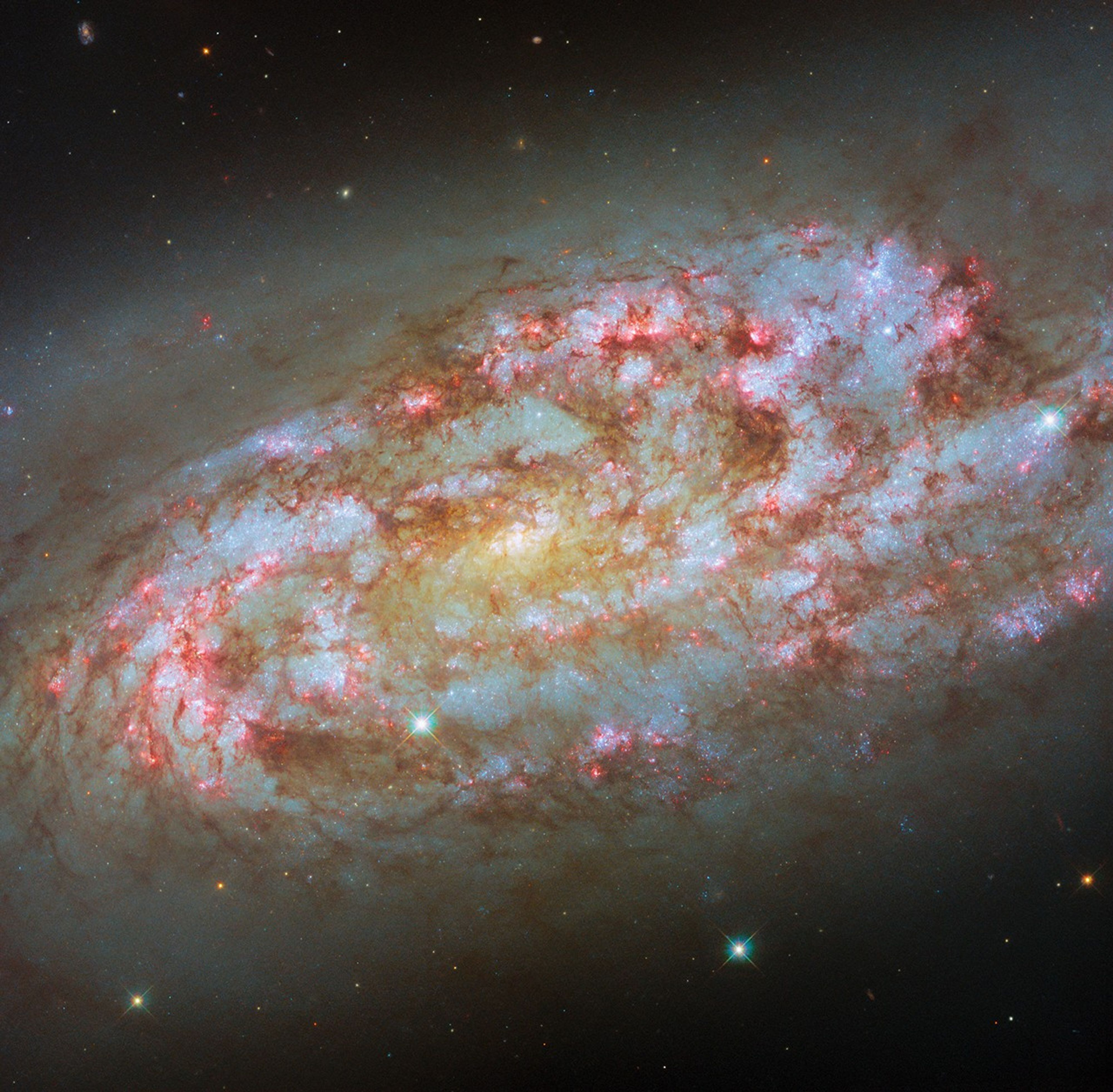
Hubble captures NGC1792 showing intense amounts of H-Alpha emission in red caused by a UV emitting swarm of new stars. NGC1792 is a spiral starburst galaxy.

This video zooms into distant galaxies undergoing a starburst in a region of sky known as the Extended Chandra Deep Field South, in the constellation of Fornax (The Furnace).

This video pans over the same galaxies.

== See also ==
- Active galaxy – Compact region at a galaxy's center with abnormally high luminosity
- Starburst regions – Region of faster than normal star formation

== Additional Reading ==
- "Chandra :: Field Guide to X-ray Sources :: Starburst Galaxies". chandra.harvard.edu.
- Kennicutt, R. C.; Evans, N. J. (2012). "Star Formation in the Milky Way and Nearby Galaxies". Annual Review of Astronomy and Astrophysics. 50: 531–608. arXiv:1204.3552. Bibcode:2012ARA&A..50..531K. doi:10.1146/annurev-astro-081811-125610. S2CID 118667387.
- Weedman, D. W.; Feldman, F. R.; Balzano, V. A.; Ramsey, L. W.; Sramek, R. A.; Wuu, C. -C. (1981). "NGC 7714 – the prototype star-burst galactic nucleus". The Astrophysical Journal. 248: 105. Bibcode:1981ApJ...248..105W. doi:10.1086/159133.
