= Itziar Aretxaga =

Spanish astrophysicist

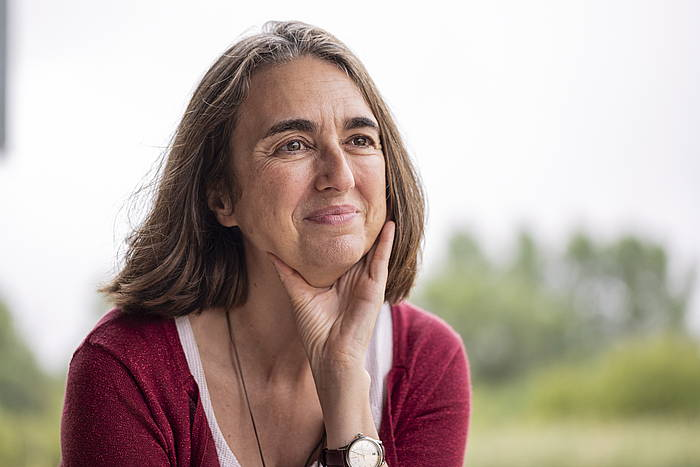
Aretxaga in 2019

Itziar Aretxaga Méndez (born 1965) is a Spanish and Mexican astrophysicist and a distinguished researcher at the Madrid Deep Space Communications Complex Center for Astrobiology (CAB CSIC-INTA). Her research interests include galaxy formation and evolution, active galactic nuclei, starbursts, and supernovae.

== Education and career ==
Born in Bilbao, Spain on 20 November 1965, Aretxaga has dual Spanish and Mexican citizenship; her first name and paternal surname are Basque. Her mother was a dressmaker and her father taught in an occupational school; she was part of the first generation of her family with a university education.

She was an undergraduate at the Complutense University of Madrid, graduating with a bachelor's degree in physics in 1988. She moved to the Autonomous University of Madrid for graduate study in physics, earning a master's degree in 1990 and completing her PhD in 1993. Her doctoral dissertation, Variabilidad óptica de núcleos galácticos activos generados por formación estelar [Optical variability of active galactic nuclei generated by star formation was supervised by Ángeles Isabel Díaz Beltrán.

Next she became a postdoctoral researcher at the Royal Greenwich Observatory in England from 1993 to 1996 and at the Max Planck Institute for Astrophysics in Germany from 1996 to 1998, supported by the Basque Government and by a Marie Curie Fellowship. She came to INAOE as a researcher in 1998 and earned tenure there in 2004.

She became the director of the International School for Young Astronomers program of the International Astronomical Union in 2018. In 2025 she moved to the Madrid Deep Space Communications Complex as a distinguished researcher.

== Recognition ==
Aretxaga is a member of the Mexican Academy of Sciences, elected in 2003.
