= MCG +07-33-027 =

Isolated spiral galaxy in the constellation Hercules

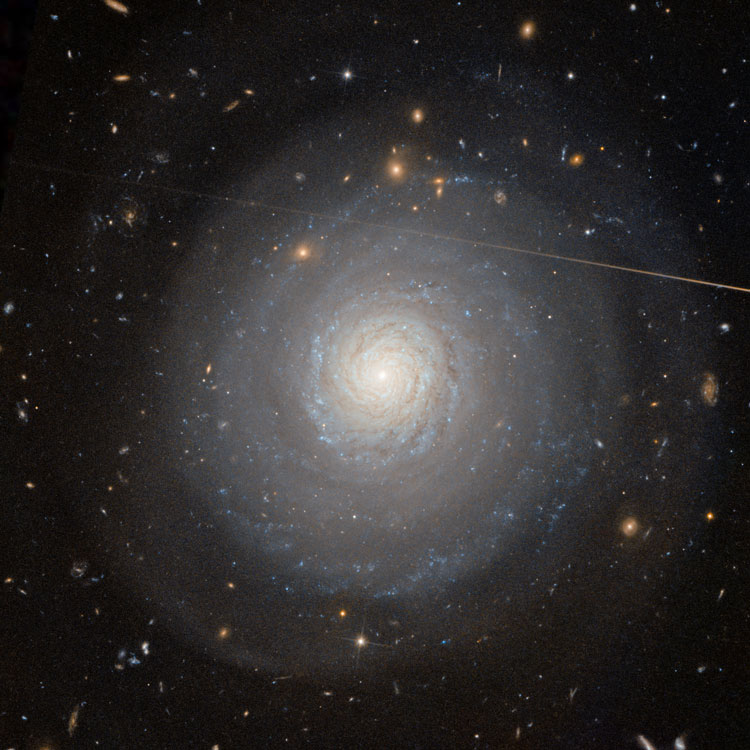
- Starburst galaxy MCG +07-33-027 imaged by the Hubble Space Telescope.

Observation data (J2000 epoch)
- Constellation: Hercules
- Right ascension: 16^{h} 02^{m} 16.6^{s}
- Declination: 42° 55′ 01″
- Redshift: 0.024486/7341 km/s
- Distance: 329,462,000 ly
- Apparent magnitude (V): 14.5

Characteristics
- Type: Sa
- Size: ~104,057.8 ly (estimated)
- Apparent size (V): 0.86' x 0.74

Other designations
- PGC 56779

MCG +07-33-027 is an isolated spiral galaxy located about 330 million light-years away in the constellation Hercules. It has a very high rate of star formation which would make it a starburst galaxy. Normally, starburst galaxies are triggered by the collision of another galaxy. However, most galaxies are in groups or clusters, while MCG +07-33-027 is solitary. Therefore, the cause of the starburst was not due to a collision or by the passing of a nearby galaxy and so the cause of the activity remains unknown.

== Supernova ==
One supernova has been observed in MCG +07-33-027.

- SN 2005bk (Type Ic, mag. 18) was discovered by R. A. Jansen, K. Tamura, and N. A. Grogin on April 2, 2005.

== See also ==
- NGC 3034
- Baby Boom Galaxy
- Morphological Catalogue of Galaxies
