= SBS 1415+437 =

Wolf-Rayet galaxy and dwarf galaxy in the constellation Boötes

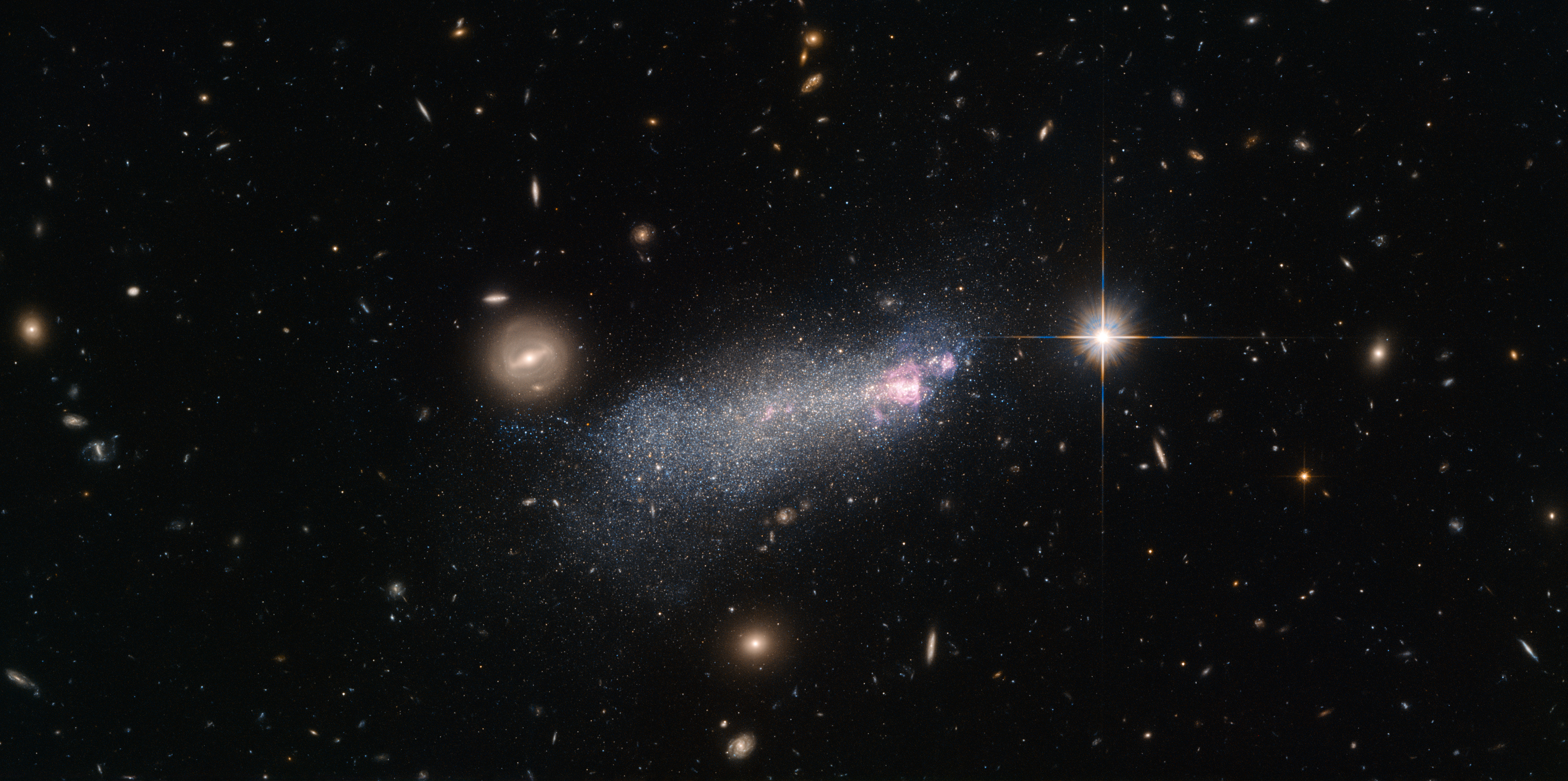

Observation data (J2000 epoch)
- Constellation: Boötes
- Right ascension: 14h 27m 01.68s
- Declination: +43° 30′ 22.88″
- Redshift: 0.002055
- Heliocentric radial velocity: 616 km/s
- Distance: 45.3 million ly
- Apparent magnitude (B): 15.6

Characteristics
- Type: Dwarf galaxy
- Size: 10,000 ly
- Apparent size (V): 0.75' x 0.15'

Other designations
- PGC 51017, SBSG 1415+437, SDSS CGB 12067.1

SBS 1415+437, also known as PGC 51017, is a blue compact dwarf galaxy and Wolf-Rayet galaxy located in the constellation Boötes approximately 45.3 million light-years away from the Milky Way. It was discovered in 1995 by a team of astronomers from the University of Virginia coordinated by Trinh Thuan.

It was initially thought that the galaxy hosted only very young stars, but the stars were later found to be up to 1.3 billion years old.

SBS 1415+437 is also a starburst galaxy of the rare Wolf-Rayet type, as it contains an unusually large number of Wolf-Rayet stars. These are massive stars (at least 20 solar masses), short-lived, with surface temperatures of over 25,000 kelvin which, due to very strong stellar winds (over 2,000 km/s), lose large quantities of their mass (in about 100,000 years a Wolf-Rayet star can lose the equivalent of the mass of the Sun). It is said the galaxy hosted a number of Red-giant branch stars apart from Wolf-Rayets as well.

In 2019, astronomers found there are traces of ionized gas inside the star-forming regions of SBS 1415+437, hinting the presence of elemental abundances of chemical elements such as nitrogen, argon and sulfur.

== See also ==
- List of galaxies
- Kiso 5639, a similar dwarf galaxy
