= FSC 15307+3253 =

Galaxy in the constellation Corona Borealis

FSC15307+3253
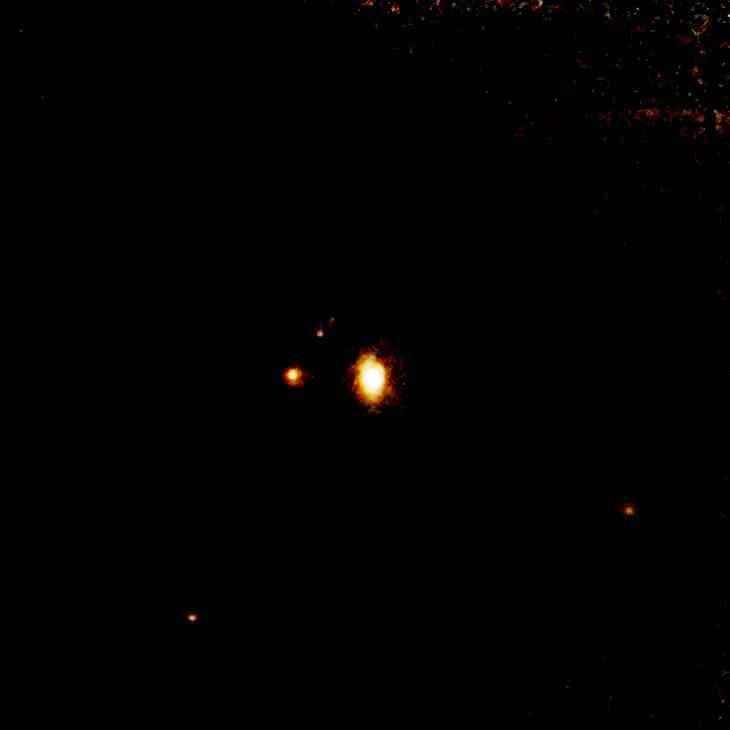
- HST image of FSC 15307+3253

Observation data (J2000 epoch)
- Constellation: Corona Borealis
- Right ascension: 15^{h} 32^{m} 44.02597^{s}
- Declination: +32° 42′ 46.7198″
- Redshift: 0.9257 ± 0.0012
- Heliocentric radial velocity: 172447 ± 360 km/s
- Apparent magnitude (V): 19.8

Characteristics
- Mass: 1×10^{11.36} (stellar) M_{☉}

Other designations
- IRAS F15307+3252

FSC15307+3253 (or IRAS F15307+3252) is an ultraluminous infrared galaxy (ULIRG), with a luminosity between 8 and 1000 μm of approximately 2×10^{13} L_{☉}, possibly the highest currently known. The "FSC" refers to Faint Source Catalogue, one of the source catalogs produced by the IRAS infrared survey mission. The emission is believed due to some combination of starburst activity and accretion onto a super-massive black hole, producing primary radiation at shorter wavelengths which is mostly blocked by obscuring dust, which is in turn heated and re-radiates in the infrared. The redshift of the source is z = 0.93, indicating a distance of the order of 7 billion light years.
