= HXMM01 =

Galaxy in the constellation Cetus

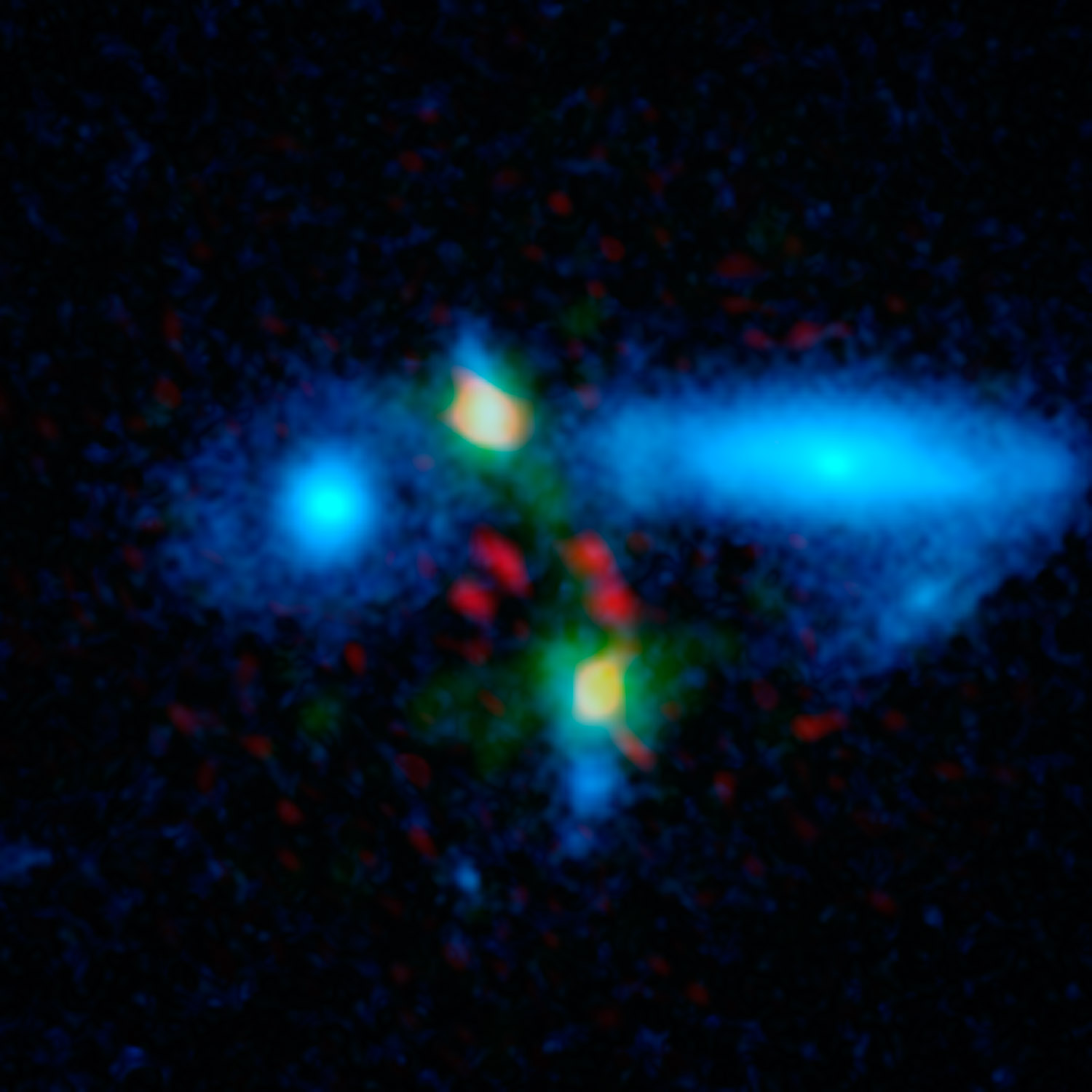
- HXXM01, a rapidly merging pair of galaxies that will in time see a massive burst of star formation.

Observation data (J2000 epoch)
- Constellation: Cetus
- Right ascension: 02^{h} 20^{m} 16.65^{s} 02^{h} 20^{m} 16.58^{s}
- Declination: −06° 01′ 41.9″ −06° 01′ 44.3″
- Redshift: 2.307

Characteristics
- Mass: 1×10^{12}–1×10^{15} M_{☉}
- Mass/Light ratio: 3.0×10^{13}–3.4×10^{13} M_{☉}/L_{☉}

Other designations
- 1HERMES S250 J022016.5−060143

HXMM01, known more formally as 1HERMES S250 J022016.5−060143, is a starburst galaxy located in the northwestern portion of the constellation Cetus. (Note: Inferred from right ascension and declination of galaxy using the Fourmilab Virtual Telescope.) Discovered in 2013 by a team at the University of California, Irvine, it was discovered that HXMM01 is actually still forming from its two parent galaxies as part of the "brightest, most luminous and most gas-rich submillimeter-bright galaxy merger known." When the merger is complete, HXMM01 will rapidly evolve to become a giant elliptical galaxy with a mass about four times that of the Milky Way. As of 2013, HXMM01 has been observed to form about 2,000 M_{☉} of stars every year, with an efficiency ten times greater than that of typical galaxies (Note: Typical galaxies are those of similar mass and phase of evolution to HXMM01, not those considered "typical" in the Universe as a whole or with respect to the Milky Way.) and far more than the Milky Way's 0.68–1.45 M_{☉} per year.

== History of observation ==
A team at the University of California, Irvine, led by Asantha Cooray, was the first to detect and characterize HXMM01 in data from the Herschel space telescope's HerMES instrument. Initially noticed as an "amazing, bright blob" in an otherwise cold region of the cosmos, the galaxy was revealed to be an extremely bright submillimeter galaxy (SMG) after an extensive series of observations across the electromagnetic spectrum. Analyses of the data, published in May 2013, revealed the galaxy to be a merging pair with a mass at least ten times that of the Milky Way.

== Physical characteristics ==
With a mass at least 10 times that of the Milky Way, HXMM01 is located at a redshift of 2.307 (corresponding to a distance of about 11 billion light years under the Λ-CDM model of cosmology) and has various physical features that are not characteristic of SMGs. For example, the dust temperature of the galaxy is a relatively high 55 K, 36% more than the 35 K average for star-forming galaxies at similar redshifts. As a result of this extremely high temperature, star formation in HXMM01 is extremely efficient and causes the galaxy to have a relatively high infrared luminosity of 3.2×10^{13} L_{☉}.

HXMM01 has an extremely high rate of star formation of roughly 2,000 M_{☉}, a rate that will cause the nascent galaxy to consume nearly all of its gas and dust within 200 million years. The observation has profound implications for our conception of the formation of giant elliptical galaxies—although the process of formation for dwarf ellipticals had already been determined through analyses of gas density in lower-mass galaxies, the formation of giant elliptical galaxies had eluded description until the discovery of HXMM01. By analyzing HXMM01's rapid rate of star formation, the discovery team was able to deduce that giant elliptical galaxies would be able to form in the Universe at a redshift of about 1.5, corresponding to a distance (and thus observed galactic age) of about 4 billion years. (Note: Computed based on: Wright, E. L. (2006). "A Cosmology Calculator for the World Wide Web". Publications of the Astronomical Society of the Pacific. 118 (850): 1711–1715. arXiv:astro-ph/0609593. Bibcode:2006PASP..118.1711W. doi:10.1086/510102. S2CID 9225000.)

== See also ==
- Lists of galaxies
