= Kiso 5639 =

Dwarf galaxy in Ursa Major

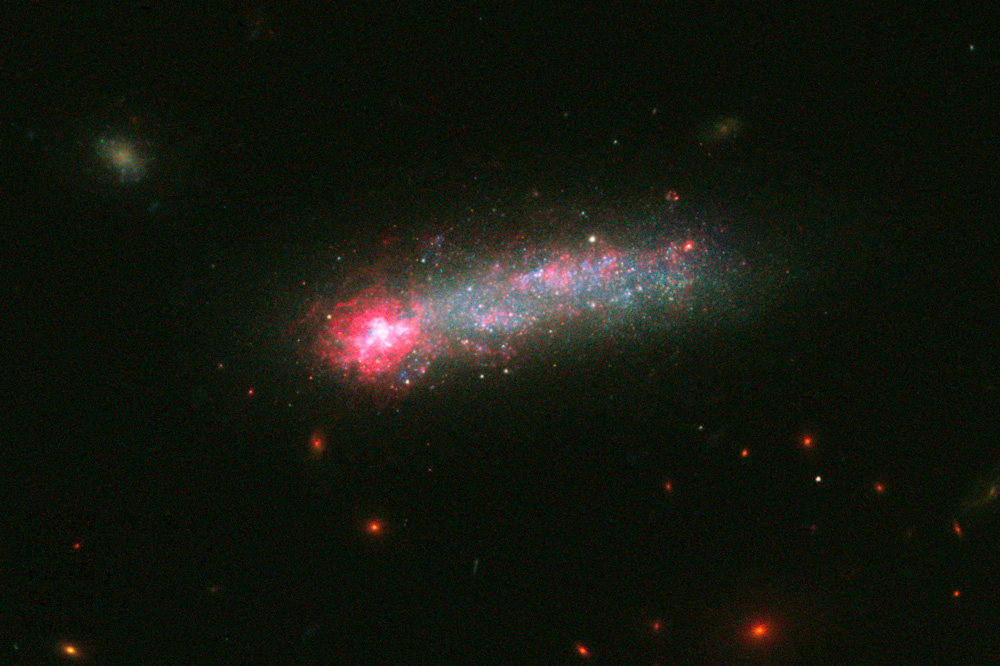
- Kiso 5639, photographed by the Hubble Space Telescope

Observation data (J2000 epoch)
- Constellation: Ursa Major
- Right ascension: 11h 41m 07.5s
- Declination: +32° 25′ 37″
- Redshift: z = 0,00606
- Heliocentric radial velocity: 1.796 km/s
- Distance: 85 million ly

Characteristics
- Type: Dwarf galaxy, starburst galaxy
- Size: 2,700 ly

Other designations
- LEDA 36252 KUG 1138+327 SDSS J114107.48+322537.2 SDSS J114107.49+322537.3 The Skyrocket Galaxy

Kiso 5639 (also known as LEDA 36252, KUG 1138+327 or the Skyrocket Galaxy) is an irregular dwarf galaxy in the constellation Ursa Major, approximately 85 million light-years from Earth. It has an elongated and flattened shape, with a maximum diameter that extends for approximately 2,700 light years. The new stars are distributed in about ten groups and have a mass corresponding to about one million solar masses. This intense activity also corresponds to the presence of areas in which the matter is rarefied, which were probably formed following a combination of stellar winds and supernovae explosions. The starburst of the galaxy is believed to have occurred around one million years ago.

== Etymology ==
Kiso 5639 has been referred to as the Skyrocket Galaxy, an informal name due to it being described as resembling a "July 4th skyrocket" by NASA. It has also been informally called the Rocket Galaxy due to its "tail" structure and brightness at the head.

== Morphology ==
Kiso 5639 has an extremely irregular shape. At the head is an intense concentration of stars compared to the rest of the galaxy, such that it resembles a tadpole. This area of high intensity is determined by the presence of abundant concentrations of hydrogen gas and intense star formation activity. The galaxy has an elongated and flattened "pancake" shape, with a maximum diameter that extends for approximately 2,700 light years.

== Discovery ==
Kiso 5639 was discovered in 2004 using the Hubble Space Telescope, and was further observed in February and July 2015 with the Wide Field Camera 3.

== Star formation ==
Faint areas of star formation are present in other parts of the galaxy, with stellar elements ranging in age from several million to a few billion years. These data were collected from observations made by the Hubble Space Telescope during 2015 and were published in The Astrophysical Journal. The starburst is believed to have begun approximately one million years ago following the galaxy's encounter with a filament of intergalactic gas. The new stars in the galaxy are distributed in about ten groups and have a mass corresponding to about one million solar masses.

== Gallery ==
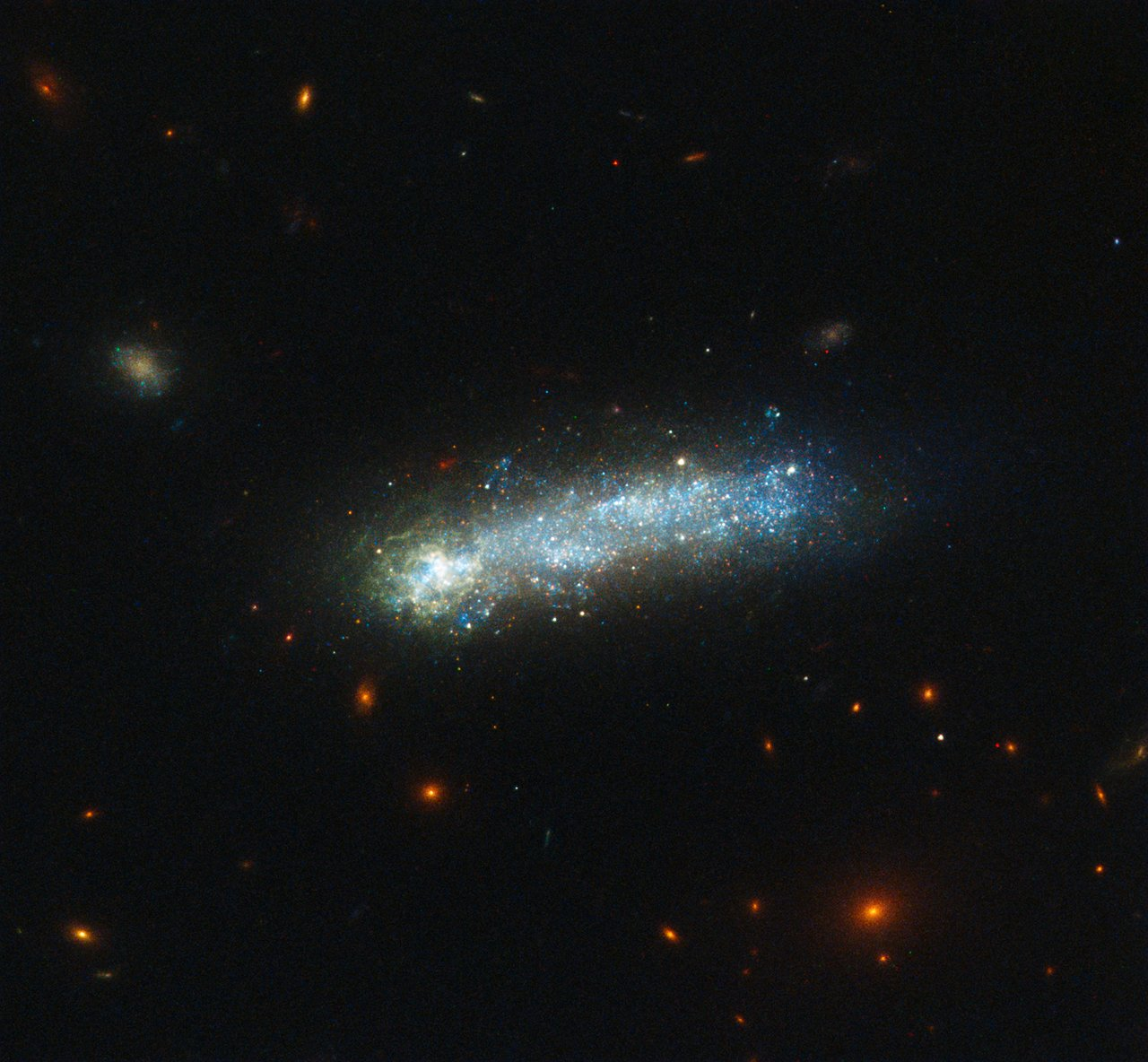
As seen in false color by the Hubble Space Telescope

== See also ==
- Lists of galaxies
- Galaxy formation and evolution
- Tadpole Galaxy
