= IC 10 =

Irregular starburst galaxy in the constellation Cassiopeia

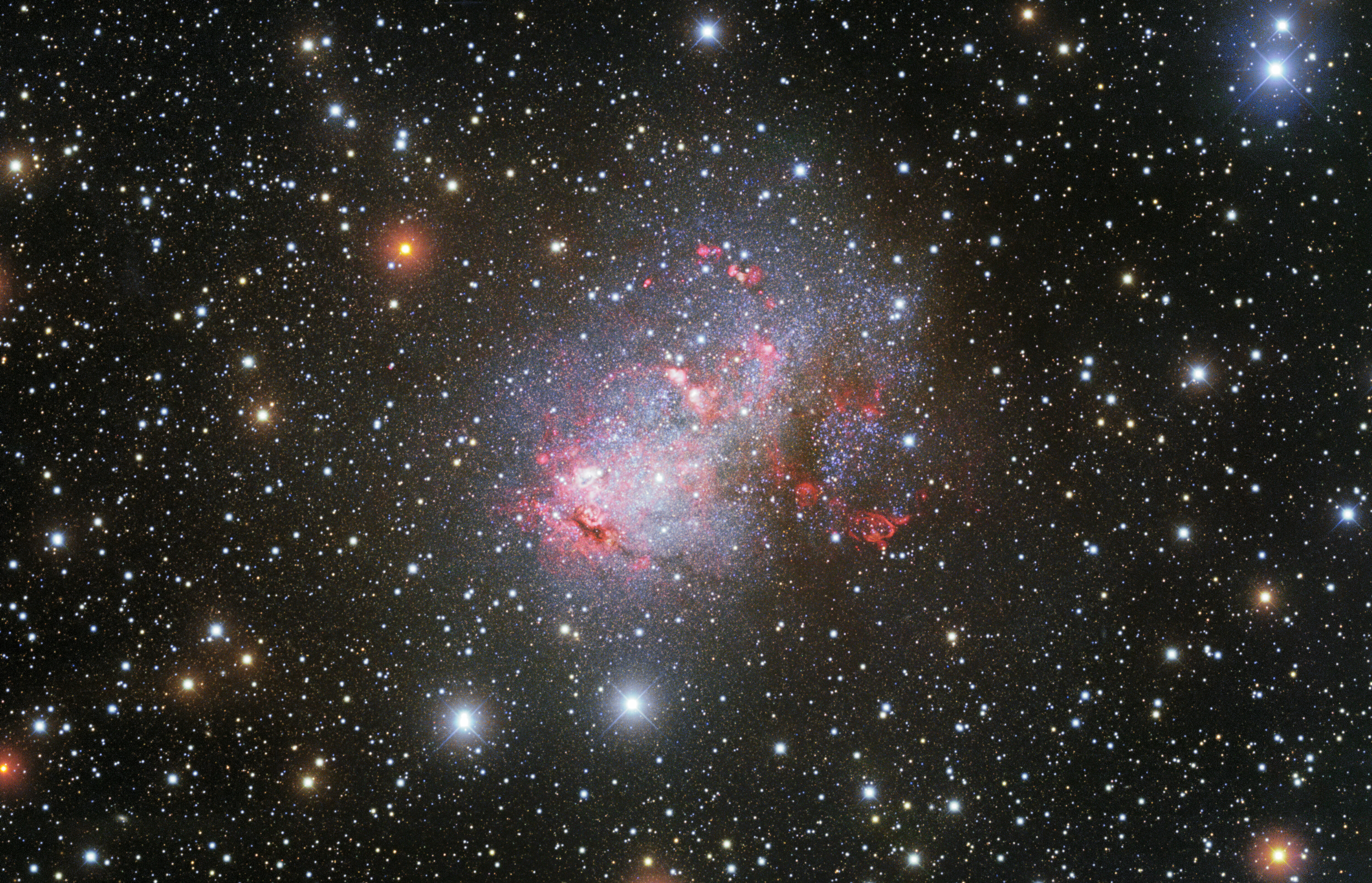
- IC 10 Imaged by KPNO

Observation data (J2000 epoch)
- Constellation: Cassiopeia
- Right ascension: 00^{h} 20^{m} 17.2917^{s}
- Declination: +59° 18′ 13.867″
- Redshift: 0.001161±0.000003
- Distance: 2.5 ± 0.5 Mly (750 ± 150 kpc)
- Apparent magnitude (V): 10.4 ± 0.2

Characteristics
- Type: dIrr IV/BCD
- Size: 5000 light years (diameter)
- Apparent size (V): 6.8′ × 5.9′
- Notable features: mild starburst galaxy

Other designations
- IRAS 00175+5902, UGC 192, MCG +10-01-001, PGC 1305

IC 10 is an irregular galaxy in the constellation Cassiopeia. It was discovered by American astronomer Lewis Swift on 8 October 1887. In 1935 Nicholas Mayall became the first to suggest that the object is extragalactic. Edwin Hubble suspected it might belong to the Local Group of galaxies, but its status remained uncertain for decades. The radial velocity of IC 10 was measured in 1962, and it was found to be approaching the Milky Way at approximately 350 km/s, strengthening the evidence for its membership in the Local Group. Its membership in the group was finally confirmed in 1996 by direct measurements of its distance based on observations of Cepheids; most estimates place the galaxy 2–3 million light years from Earth, with some estimates ranging from 1.5–4.5 million light years. Despite its closeness, the galaxy is rather difficult to study because it lies near the plane of the Milky Way and is therefore heavily obscured by interstellar matter.

The apparent distance between IC 10 and the Andromeda Galaxy is about the same as the apparent distance between the Andromeda Galaxy and the Triangulum Galaxy, which suggests that IC 10 may belong to the M31 subgroup.

IC 10 is the only known starburst galaxy in the Local Group of galaxies; it has many more Wolf–Rayet stars per square kiloparsec (5.1 stars/kpc^{2}) than the Large Magellanic Cloud (2.0 stars/kpc^{2}) or the Small Magellanic Cloud (0.9 stars/kpc^{2}). Although the galaxy has a luminosity similar to the SMC, it is considerably smaller, with an estimated diameter of around 5000 light years. Its higher metallicity compared to the SMC suggests that star formation activity has continued for a longer time period. The H II regions in IC 10 have all formed recently, within the last 10 Myr. The evolutionary status of the Wolf–Rayet stars suggests that they all formed in a relatively short timespan. The ratio between the two types of Wolf–Rayet stars (WC stars and WN stars) in IC 10 is very different from the ratio in other galaxies in the Local Group, which may be somehow due to the starburst nature of the galaxy. Currently, the galaxy produces stars at the rate of 0.04–0.08 solar masses per year, which means that the gas supply in the galaxy can last for only a few billion years longer.

Observations of IC 10 in the far-infrared show that the dust in this mild starburst galaxy is deficient in small grains. It is hypothesized that any small grains that formerly existed were destroyed by strong ultraviolet radiation in the areas around the hot luminous stars that were formed in the galaxy's recent burst of star formation.

The galaxy has a huge envelope of hydrogen gas, with an apparent size measuring 68′ × 80′, which is far larger than the apparent size of the galaxy in visible light (5.5′ × 7.0′). IC 10 is also unusual in the respect that the visible part of the galaxy seems to rotate in a different direction than the outer envelope. It has an H II nucleus.

== Gallery ==
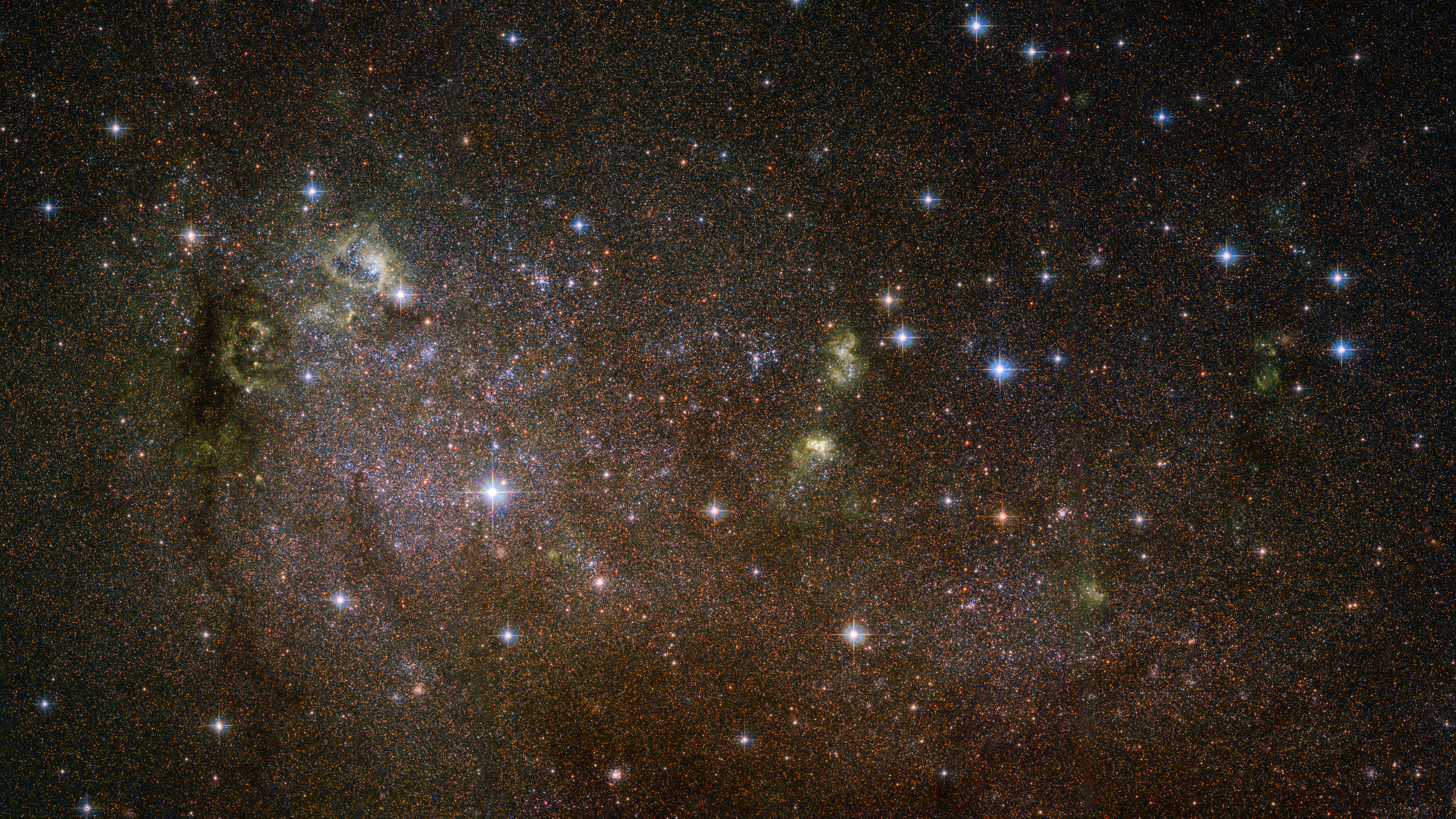
IC 10 taken by Hubble

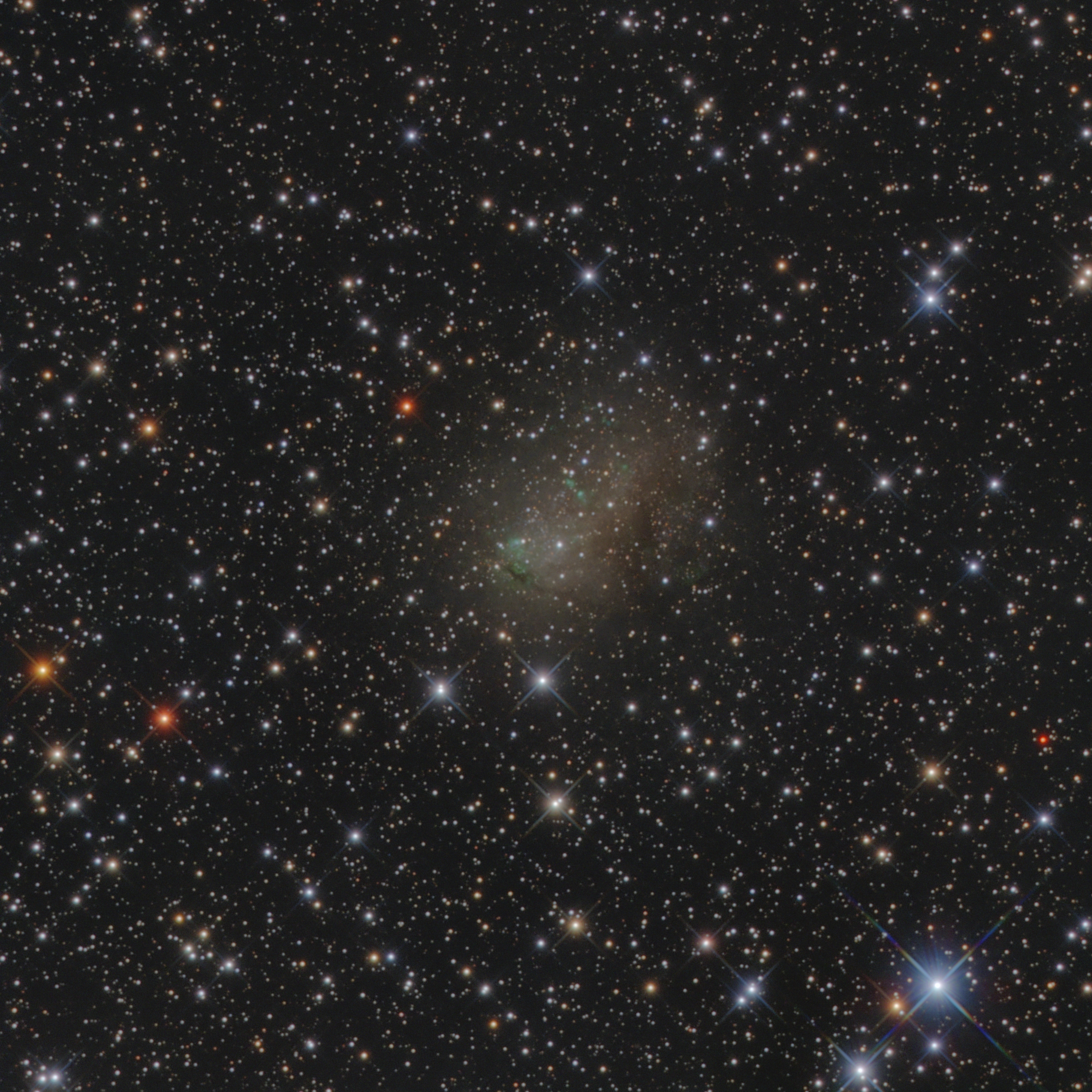
Amateur near infrared and visible light image of IC 10

== See also ==
- List of IC objects
