= Lyon-Meudon Extragalactic Database =

Database of galaxies created in 1983

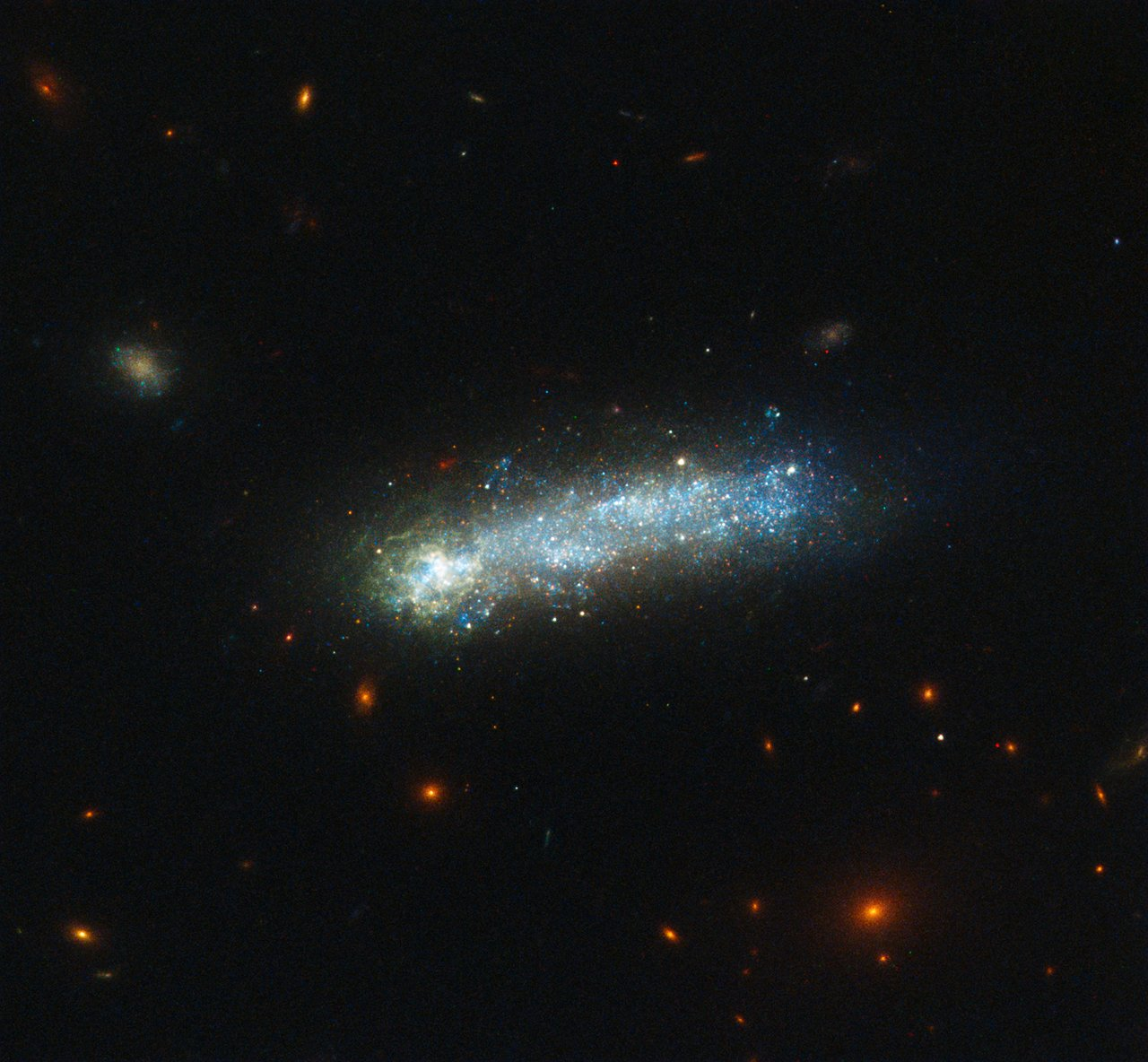
LEDA 36252 can be found in the HyperLEDA database.

The Lyon-Meudon Extragalactic Database (LEDA) was a database of galaxies, created in 1983 at the Lyon Observatory. Each galaxy had a number assigned to it, which is now known as its PGC number. The Principal Galaxies Catalogue (PGC), published in 1989, was based on the Lyon-Meudon Extragalactic Database and contained cross-identifications for it. LEDA was eventually merged with Hypercat to become HyperLEDA in 2000, itself also known as PGC2003. LEDA originally contained information on more than 60 parameters for about 100,000 galaxies, and now contains information on over 3 million celestial objects, of which about 1.5 million are galaxies. The database allows astronomers around the world access to its information.
