= HFLS3 =

Galaxy in the constellation Draco

HFLS 3
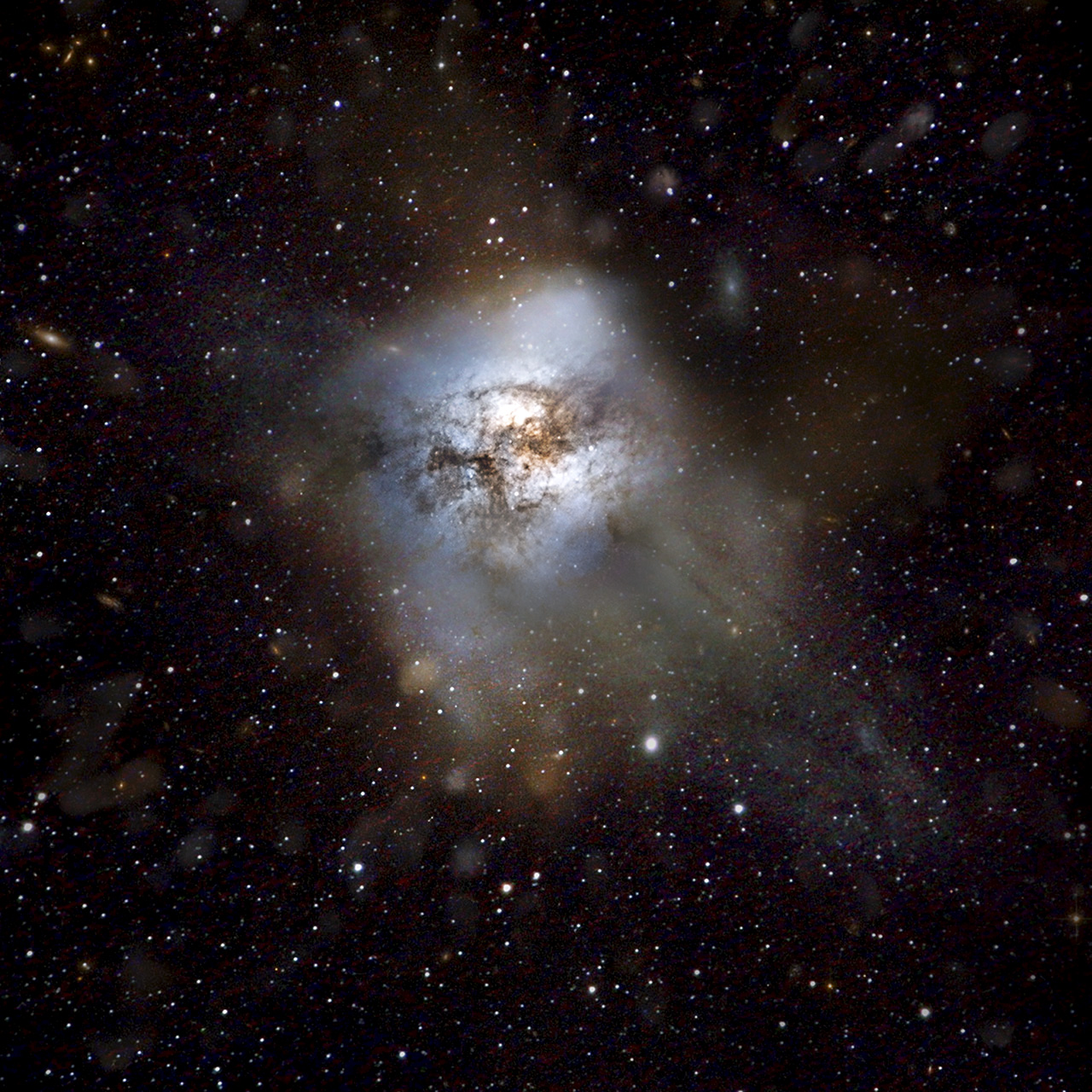

Observation data (J2000 epoch)
- Constellation: Draco
- Right ascension: 17^{h} 06^{m} 47.8^{s}
- Declination: +58° 46′ 23″
- Redshift: 6.34
- Heliocentric radial velocity: 288866 km/s
- Distance: 12.8 billion light-years (4.0 billion parsecs) (light travel distance); 28 billion light-years (8.6 billion parsecs) (present proper distance)

Characteristics
- Mass: 2.7×10^{11} M_{☉}
- Number of stars: 35 billion (3.5×10^{10})
- Notable features: Interacting galaxies

Other designations
- 1HERMES S350 J170647.8+584623, [RCP2021] HFLS3

HFLS3 is the name for a distant galaxy at z = 6.34 (i.e. 12.8 billion light-years), originating about 880 million years after the Big Bang. Its discovery was announced on 18 April 2013 as an exceptional starburst galaxy producing nearly 3,000 solar masses of stars a year. It was found using the far-infrared-capable Herschel Space Telescope. The galaxy was estimated to have 35 billion stars. It is 10–30 times the mass of other known galaxies at such an early time in the universe.

HFLS3 was subjected to a follow-up campaign by other telescopes due to its high redness. It was found in the HerMES campaign, which also found other very red sources.

== See also ==
- List of the most distant astronomical objects
