= Baby Boom Galaxy =

Specific starburst galaxy in the very distant universe

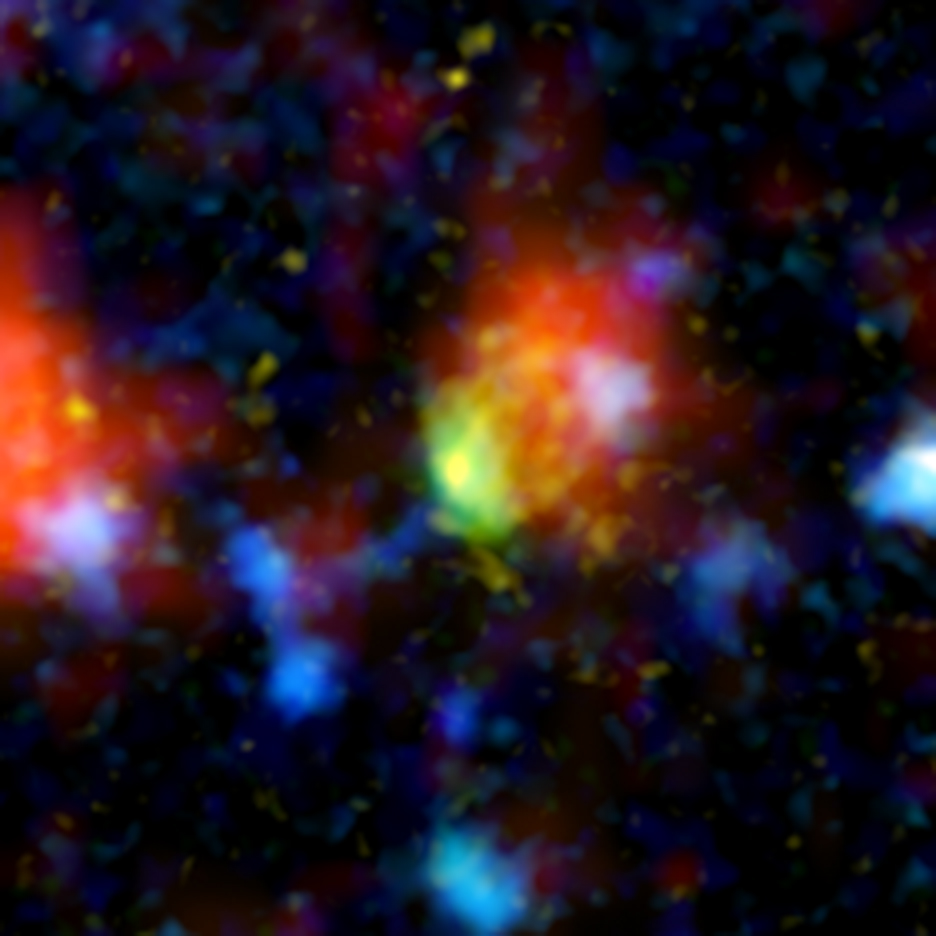
- Baby Boom Galaxy (Green-Red Splotch)

Observation data (J2000 epoch)
- Constellation: Sextans
- Right ascension: 10^{h} 00^{m} 54.52^{s}
- Declination: +02° 34′ 35.2″
- Redshift: 280919 km/s
- Distance: 12,477 billion light years (light travel distance); 25,080 billion light years (present proper distance)

Characteristics
- Type: Starburst galaxy, SMG

Other designations
- COSMOS 2328516, Baby Boom Galaxy

The Baby Boom Galaxy is a starburst galaxy located about 12.477 billion light years away (co-moving distance is 25.08 billion light years). Discovered by NASA's Spitzer Science Center at the California Institute of Technology, the galaxy is the record holder for the brightest starburst galaxy in the very distant universe, with brightness being a measure of its extreme star-formation rate. The Baby Boom Galaxy has been nicknamed "the extreme stellar machine" because it is seen producing stars at a rate of up to 4,000 per year (almost 11 stars per day). The Milky Way galaxy in which Earth resides turns out an average of just 10 stars per year.

== Discovery ==
The Baby Boom Galaxy was discovered and characterized in 2008 using a suite of telescopes operating at different wavelengths. NASA's Hubble Space Telescope and Japan's Subaru Telescope, atop Mauna Kea in Hawaii, first spotted the galaxy in visible-light images, where it appeared as an inconspicuous smudge due to its great distance. It was not until the Spitzer and the James Clerk Maxwell Telescope, also on Mauna Kea in Hawaii, observed the galaxy at infrared and submillimeter wavelengths, respectively, that the galaxy was formally discovered.

== Strange behavior ==
The Baby Boom Galaxy is named "The Baby Boom Galaxy", because it generates over 4,000 stars per year (compared to an average of just 10 per year for the Milky Way). At that rate, the galaxy needs only 50 million years to create as many stars as the most massive galaxy ever observed. The discovery also challenges the accepted model for galaxy formation, which has most galaxies slowly bulking up by absorbing pieces of other galaxies, rather than growing internally. Another unusual aspect is the fact that scientists are observing this galaxy at a time when the universe was only a little over 1.4 billion years old, meaning that this galaxy was exhibiting this strange behaviour while the universe was still in its infancy.

"This galaxy is undergoing a major baby boom, producing most of its stars all at once," said Peter Capak of NASA's Spitzer Science Center at the California Institute of Technology. "If our human population was produced in a similar boom, then almost all of the people alive today would be the same age."

To that, the principal investigator of the Cosmic Evolution Surveyor, Nick Scoville of Caltech responded: "We may be witnessing, for the first time, the formation of one of the most massive elliptical galaxies in the universe."

== Colors ==
The red color on the galaxy represents the birth of new stars. The color green represents a denoted gas, while the blue shows other galaxies that are less active in producing stars.

== See also ==
- Messier 82 – Galaxy in the constellation Ursa Major
- Starburst galaxy – Galaxy undergoing an exceptionally high rate of star formation
