= NGC 278 =

Galaxy in the constellation Cassiopeia

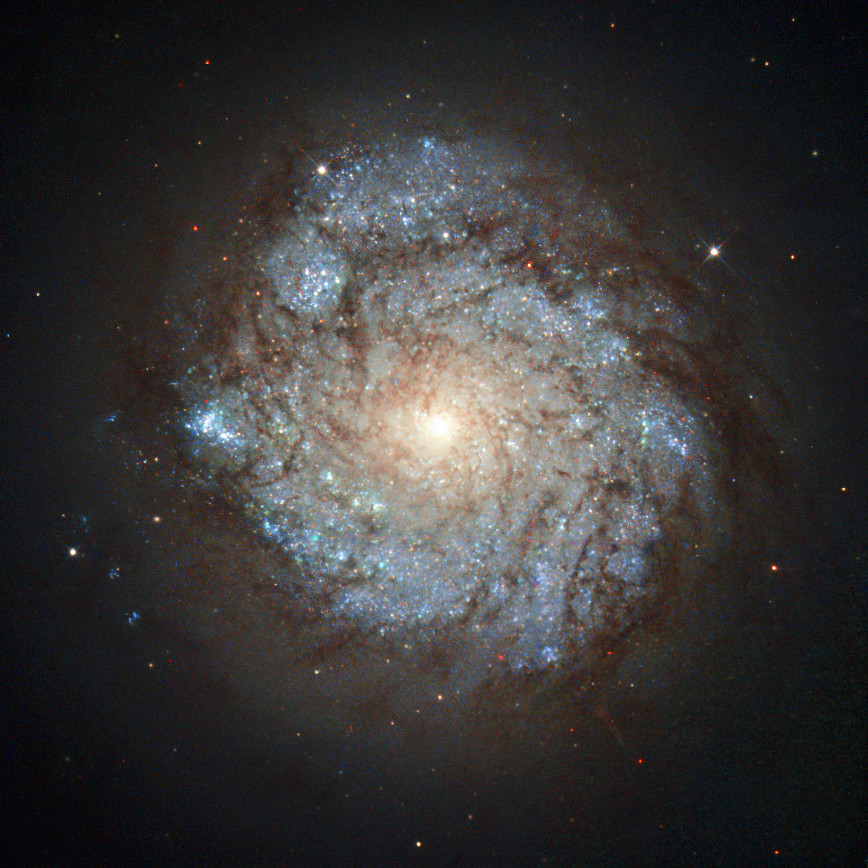
- NGC 278 by HST

Observation data (J2000 epoch)
- Constellation: Cassiopeia
- Right ascension: 00^{h} 52^{m} 04.3^{s}
- Declination: +47° 33′ 02″
- Redshift: 0.002090
- Heliocentric radial velocity: 627±1 km/s
- Distance: 39 Mly (12.1 Mpc)
- Group or cluster: Virgo Supercluster
- Apparent magnitude (V): 11.5
- Absolute magnitude (B): −19.6

Characteristics
- Type: SAB(rs)b
- Apparent size (V): 2′.1 × 2′.0

Other designations
- UGC 528, PGC 3051

NGC 278 is an isolated spiral galaxy in the northern circumpolar constellation of Cassiopeia, near the southern constellation boundary with Andromeda. It lies at a distance of approximately 39 megalight-years from the Milky Way, giving it a physical scale of 190 ly (58 pc) per arcsecond. The galaxy was discovered on December 11, 1786 by German-born astronomer William Herschel. J. L. E. Dreyer described it as, "considerably bright, pretty large, round, 2 stars of 10th magnitude near".

The morphological classification of this galaxy is SAB(rs)b, which indicates a weak bar structure around the nucleus (SAB), an incomplete ring around the bar (rs), and moderately-tightly wound spiral arms (b). It is a relatively small, compact spiral with a diameter of 23 kly (7 kpc), multiple flocculent arms and a bright, dusty nucleus that does not appear to be active. However, the neutral hydrogen in the galaxy is spread over a diameter five times larger than its visible size.

Although it appears nearly face-on, the galactic plane is inclined by an angle of 28° to the line of sight from the Earth, with the major axis being oriented along a position angle of 116°. The outer part of the disk appears to be warped, so that the major axis is not quite perpendicular to the minor axis, and the morphology is somewhat disrupted. The inner disk contains multiple intense star-forming regions. This is taking place in an inner ring with a radius of 6.5 kly (2 kpc) that may have been triggered by a merger with a smaller companion. It has an H II nucleus.
