= NGC 1569 =

Galaxy in the constellation Camelopardalis

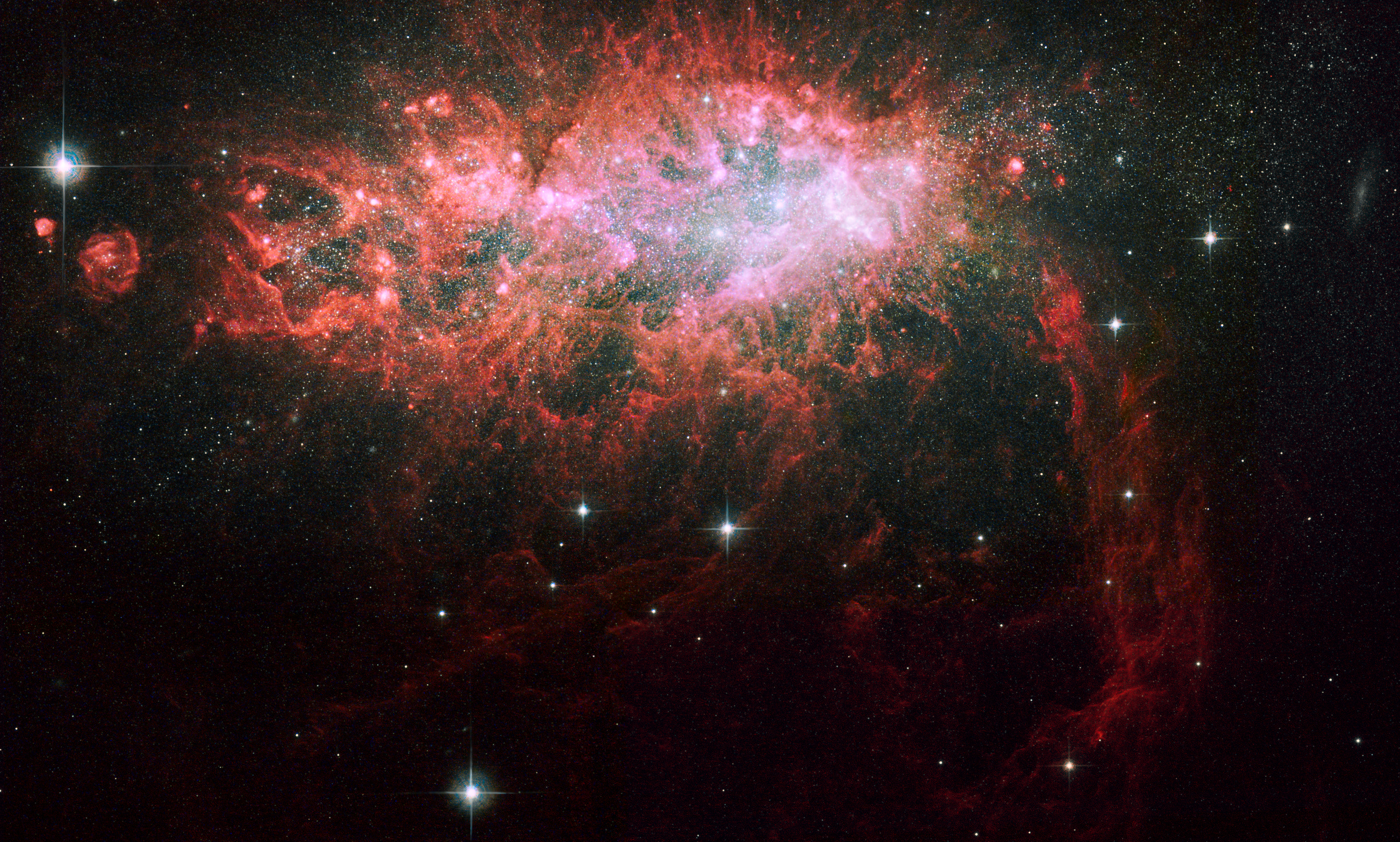
- A Hubble Space Telescope (HST) image of NGC 1569

Observation data (J2000 epoch)
- Constellation: Camelopardalis
- Right ascension: 4^{h} 30^{m} 49.1^{s}
- Declination: +64° 50′ 53″
- Redshift: -104 km/s
- Distance: 10.96 ± 0.65 Mly (3.36 ± 0.20 Mpc)
- Apparent magnitude (V): 11.9

Characteristics
- Type: IBm
- Size: 15,750 ly (4.83 kpc)
- Apparent size (V): 3.6′ × 1.8′
- Notable features: Contains two super star clusters

Other designations
- VII Zw 016, Arp 210, NGC 1569, UGC 3056, PGC 15345

NGC 1569 is a dwarf irregular galaxy in Camelopardalis. The galaxy is relatively nearby, and consequently, the Hubble Space Telescope can easily resolve the stars within the galaxy. The distance to the galaxy was previously believed to be only 2.4 Mpc (7.8 Mly). However, in 2008 scientists studying images from Hubble calculated the galaxy's distance at nearly 11 million light-years away, about 4 million light-years farther than previously thought, meaning it is a member of the IC 342 group of galaxies.

== Physical characteristics ==
NGC 1569 is smaller than the Small Magellanic Cloud, but brighter than the Large Magellanic Cloud.

== Starburst ==
NGC 1569 is characterized by a large starburst. It has formed stars at a rate 100 times greater than that of the Milky Way during the last 100 million years. It contains two prominent super star clusters with different histories. Both clusters have experienced episodic star formation. Super star cluster A, located in the northwest of the galaxy and actually formed of two close clusters (NGC 1569 A1 and NGC 1569 A2), contains young stars (including Wolf-Rayet stars) that formed less than 5 million years ago (in NGC 1569 A1) as well as older red stars (in NGC 1569 A2). Super star cluster B, located near the center of the galaxy, contains an older stellar population of red giants and red supergiants. Both of these star clusters are thought to have masses equivalent to the masses of the globular clusters in the Milky Way (approximately (6-7) × 10^{5} solar masses). Numerous smaller star clusters, some of them having masses similar to those of small globular clusters or R136 in the Large Magellanic Cloud, with relatively young ages (between 2 million years and 1 billion years) have also been identified. These results, along with the results from other dwarf galaxies such as the Large Magellanic Cloud and NGC 1705, demonstrate that star formation in dwarf galaxies does not occur continuously but instead occurs in a series of short, nearly instantaneous bursts.

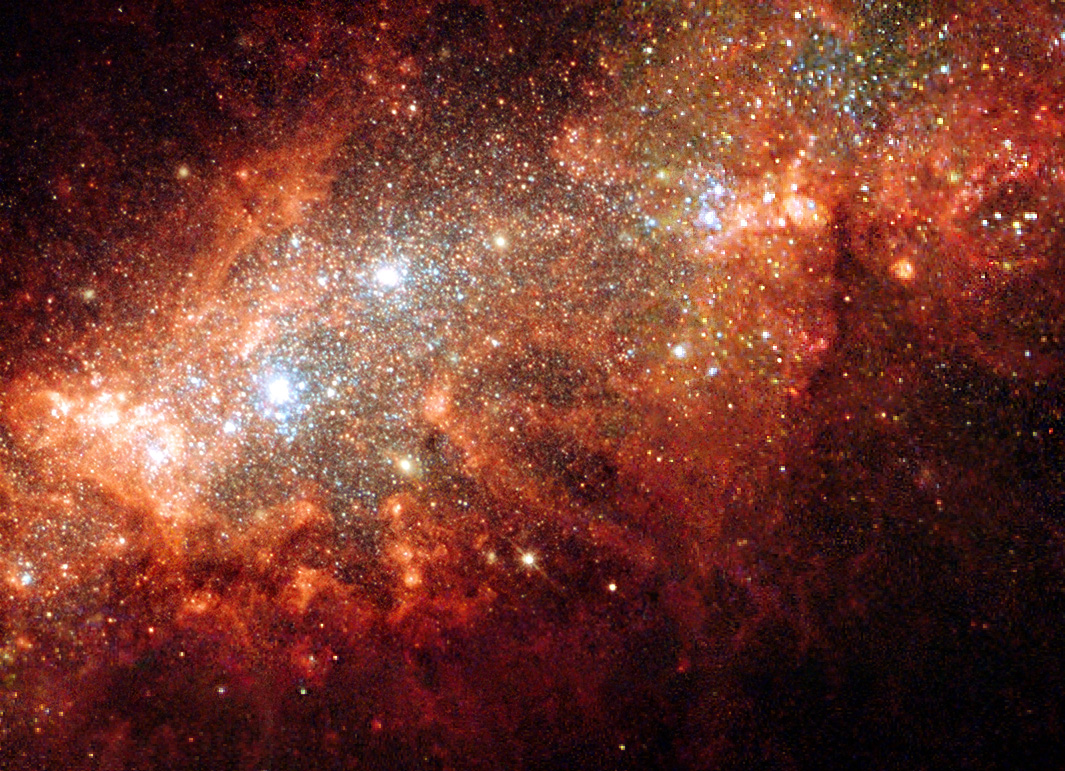
Center of NGC 1569 as imaged by the Hubble Space Telescope. At center left the two super star clusters NGC 1569 A1 and NGC 1569 A2 are visible.

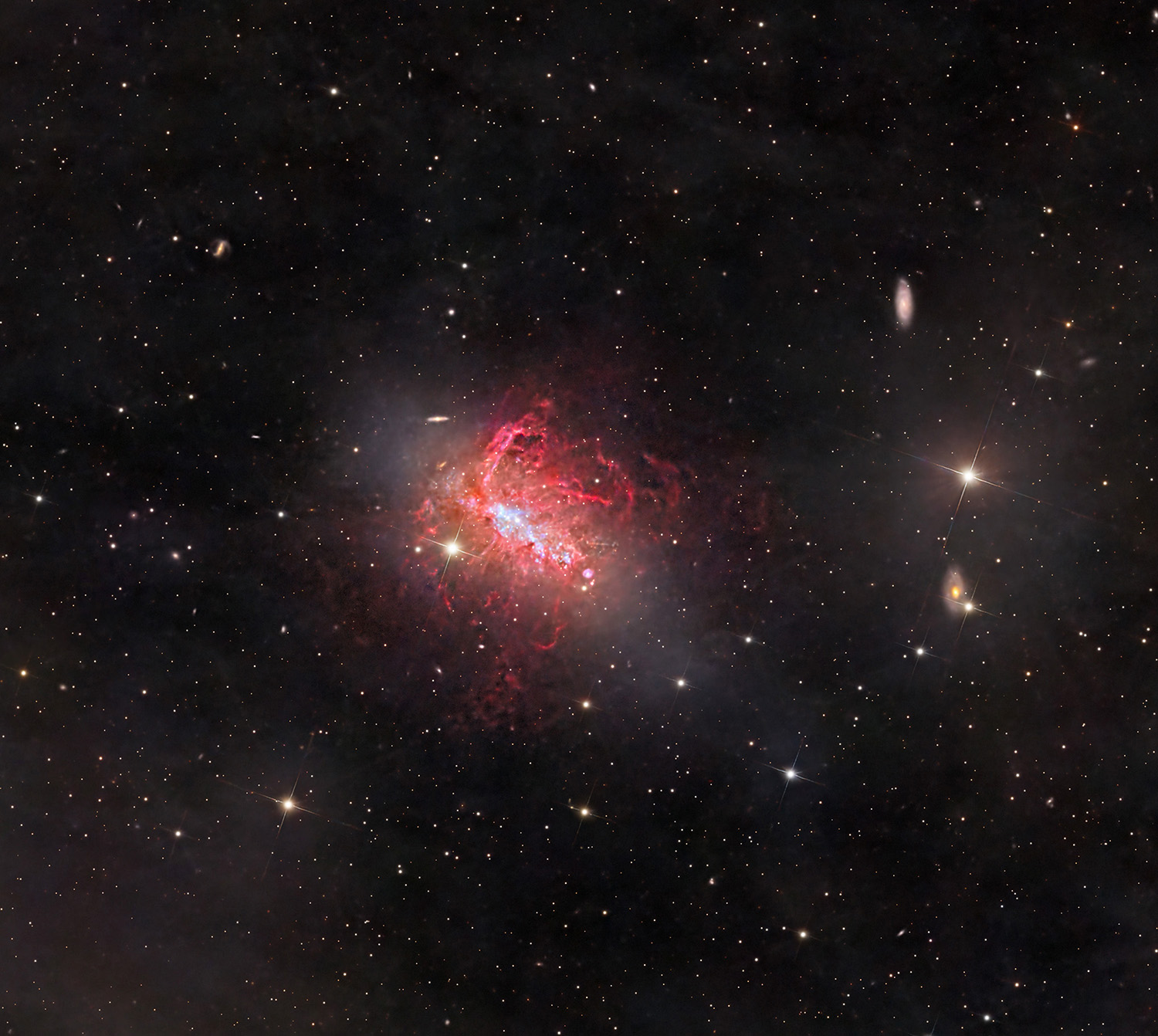
A deep ground-based image of NGC 1569 showing the filamentary outflow of hydrogen gas. Processed by Adam Block (astrophotographer)

The numerous supernovae produced in the galaxy as well as the strong stellar winds of its stars have produced filaments and bubbles of ionized hydrogen with respective sizes of up to 3,700 and 380 light years that shine excited by the light of the young stars contained within them and that are conspicuous on images taken with large telescopes.

The NGC 1569 starburst is believed to have been triggered by interactions with other galaxies of the IC 342 group, in particular a nearby cloud of neutral hydrogen. A 2013 study suggested the presence of tidal tails linking this galaxy with IC 342 and the dwarf galaxy UGCA 92 (see below) whose nature, however, is unclear and may actually be structures within our galaxy.

== Blueshift ==
The spectrum of NGC 1569 is blueshifted. This means that the galaxy is moving towards the Earth. In contrast, the spectra of most other galaxies are redshifted because of the expansion of the universe.

== Environment ==
The dwarf irregular galaxy UGCA 92 is often assumed to be a companion of NGC 1569; however, its relationship to the starburst the latter is experiencing is unclear, with some authors suggesting UGCA 92 has not started it and others suggesting it has interacted with NGC 1569, being connected with it by a tidal tail and several filaments of neutral hydrogen; however, it is still unclear if those structures are associated with them or actually within the Milky Way, being unrelated with those two galaxies.
