= Abell 2744 Y1 =

Galaxy in the constellation Sculptor

Abell 2744_Y1
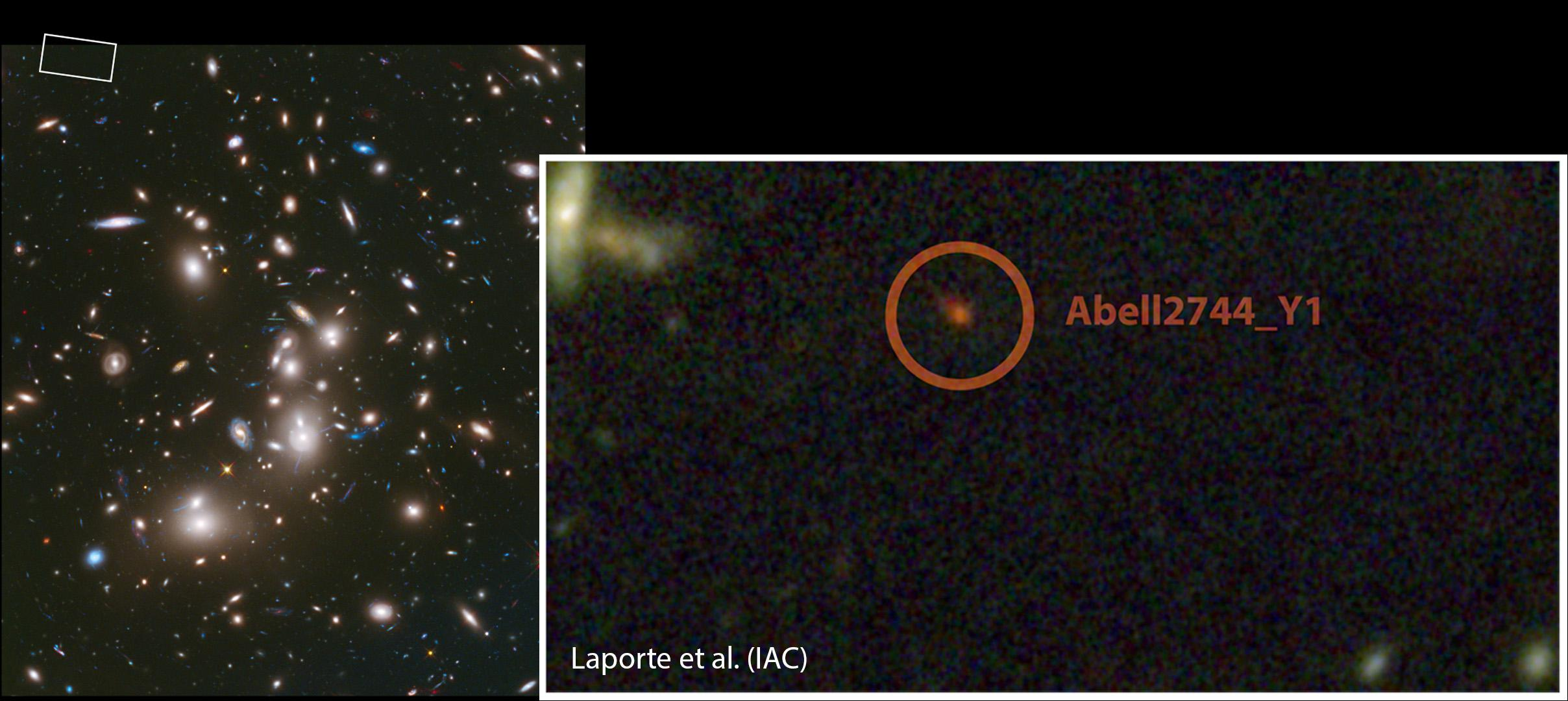
- PIA17569: Hubble Frontier Field Abell 2744: Image of the galaxy cluster Abell 2744 obtained with NASA's Hubble Space Telescope with inset showing zoomed image of the region around the galaxy Abell2744_Y1.

Observation data (J2000 epoch)
- Constellation: Sculptor
- Right ascension: 00^{h} 14^{m} 25.08^{s}
- Declination: −30° 22′ 49.7″
- Redshift: 8
- Distance: 13 billion ly (4.0 billion pc) (light travel distance); 30 billion ly (9.2 billion pc) (comoving distance)
- Group or cluster: Abell 2744

Characteristics
- Type: Dwarf
- Size: 2,300 ly (diameter)
- Apparent size (V): 0.0005 x 0.0005

Other designations
- CBZ2015 FFC1-2508-2497, ZSM2014 ZD2

Abell 2744 Y1 is a galaxy located in the Abell 2744 galaxy cluster, 13 billion light years away in the constellation Sculptor. It is 2,300 light years in diameter, 50 times smaller than the Milky Way galaxy, but producing 10 times more stars. The galaxy was discovered in July 2014 by an international team led by astronomers from the Instituto de Astrofísica de Canarias (IAC) and La Laguna University (ULL) as part of the Frontier Fields program with the help of NASA’s Spitzer and Hubble Space Telescopes.
