= Starburst region =

Region of faster than normal star formation

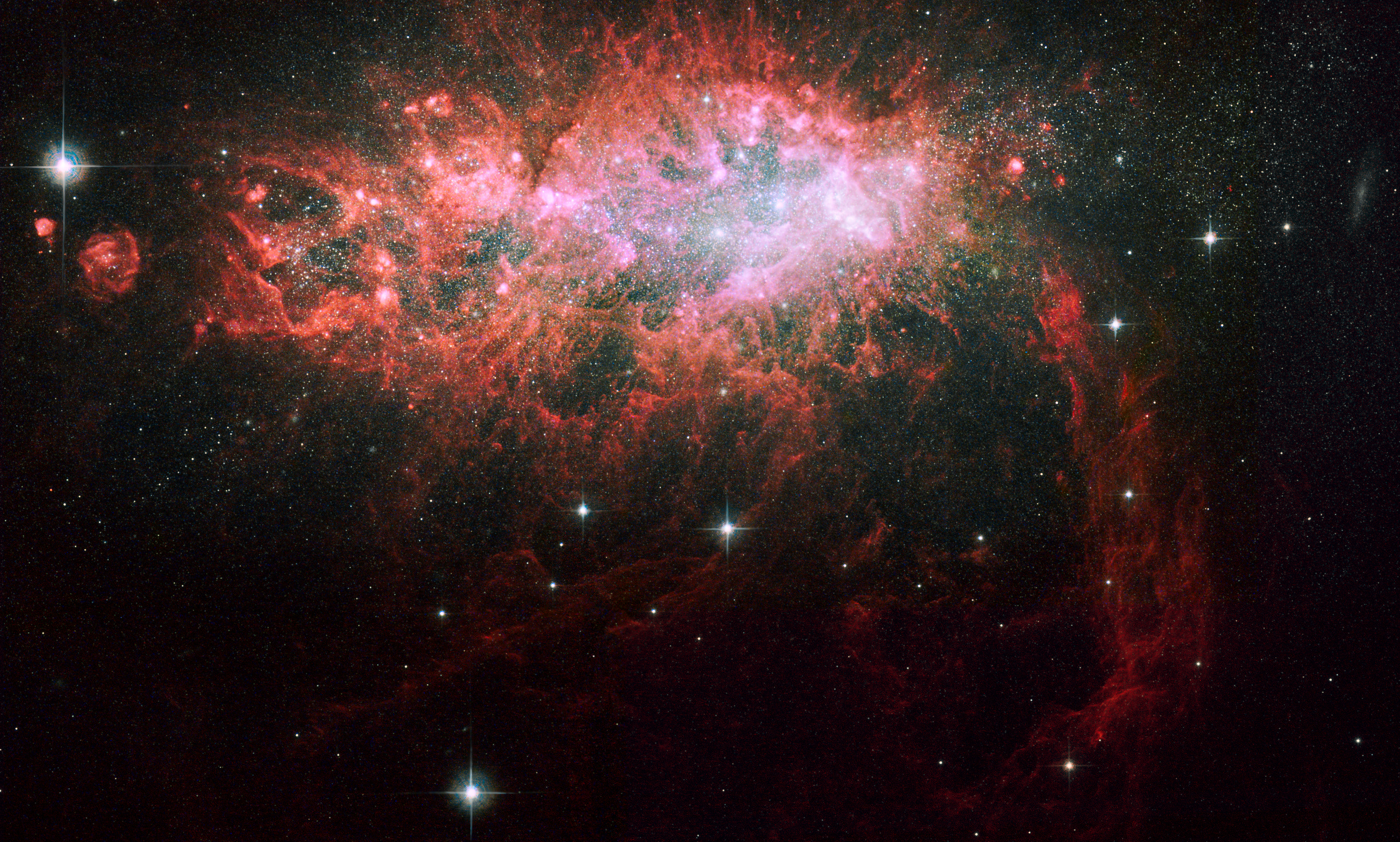
Starburst in NGC 1569, a dwarf irregular galaxy (NASA photo).

A starburst region is a region of space that is undergoing a large amount of star formation. A starburst is an astrophysical process that involves star formation occurring at a rate that is large compared to the rate that is typically observed. This starburst activity will consume the available interstellar gas supply over a timespan that is much shorter than the lifetime of the galaxy. For example, the nebula NGC 6334 has a star formation rate estimated to be 3600 solar masses per million years compared to the star formation rate of the entire Milky Way of about seven million solar masses per million years. Due to the high amount of star formation a starburst is usually accompanied by much higher gas pressure and a larger ratio of hydrogen cyanide to carbon monoxide emission-lines than are usually observed.

Tarantula Nebula, the largest starburst region in the local group.

Starbursts can occur in entire galaxies or just regions of space. For example, the Tarantula Nebula is a nebula in the Large Magellanic Cloud which has one of the highest star formation rates in the Local Group. By contrast, a starburst galaxy is an entire galaxy that is experiencing a very high star formation rate. One notable example is Messier 82 in which the gas pressure is 100 times greater than in the local neighborhood, and it is forming stars at about the same rate as the entire Milky Way in a region only about 600 parsecs (2,000 ly) across. At this rate M82 will consume its 200 million solar masses of atomic and molecular hydrogen in 100 million years (its free-fall time).

Starburst regions can occur in different shapes, for example in Messier 94 the inner ring is a starburst region. Messier 82 has a starburst core of about 600 parsec in diameter. Starbursts are common during galaxy mergers such as the Antennae Galaxies. In the case of mergers, the starburst can either be local or galaxy-wide depending on the galaxies and how they are merging.

== See also ==
- Starburst galaxy – Galaxy undergoing an exceptionally high rate of star formation
  - Messier 82 – Galaxy in the constellation Ursa Major
- Pea galaxy – Possible type of luminous blue compact galaxy
- Super star cluster – Type of very massive young open cluster thought to be the precursor of a globular cluster
- Tarantula Nebula – H II region in the constellation Dorado
