= NGC 428 =

Galaxy in the constellation Cetus

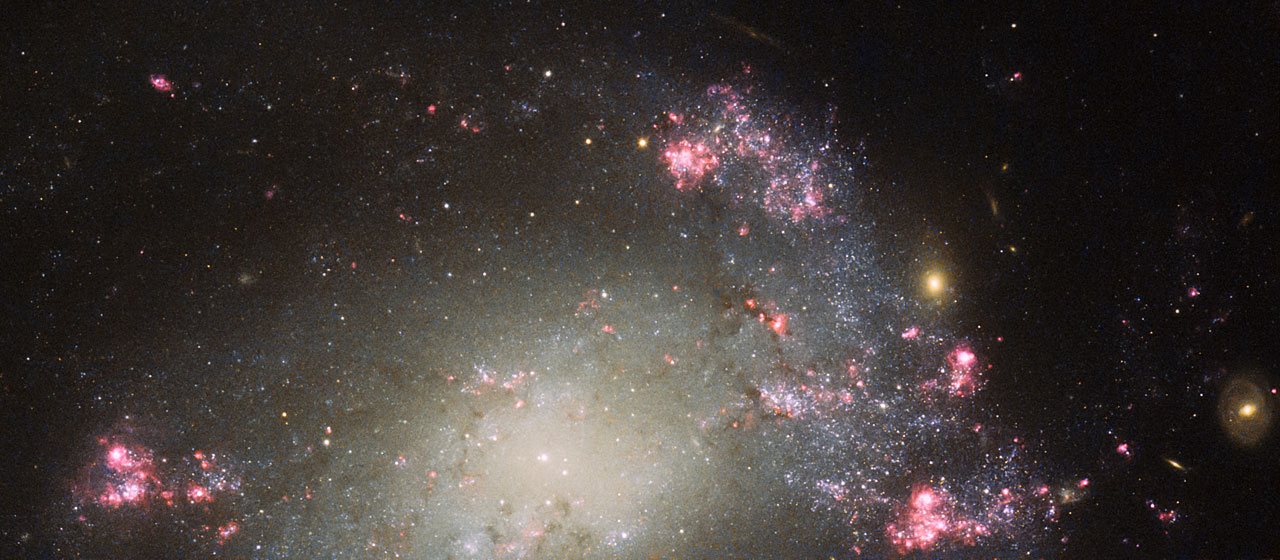
- Hubble image of NGC 428.

Observation data (J2000.0 epoch)
- Constellation: Cetus
- Right ascension: 01^{h} 12^{m} 55,709^{s}
- Declination: +00° 58′ 53.69″
- Distance: 48 mly
- Apparent magnitude (B): 12.1

Characteristics
- Type: SAB(s)m

Other designations
- IRAS 01103+0043, 2MASX J01125570+0058536, UGC 763, MCG +00-04-036, PGC 4367, CGCG 385-028

NGC 428 is a barred spiral galaxy in the constellation of Cetus (The Sea Monster), with its spiral structure distorted and warped, possibly the result of the collision of two galaxies. There appears to be a substantial amount of star formation occurring within NGC 428 and it lacks well defined arms — a telltale sign of a galaxy merger. In 2015 the Hubble Space Telescope made a close-up shot of the galaxy with its Advanced Camera for Surveys and its Wide Field and Planetary Camera 2. The structure of NGC 428 has been compared to NGC 5645.

== Discoveries ==
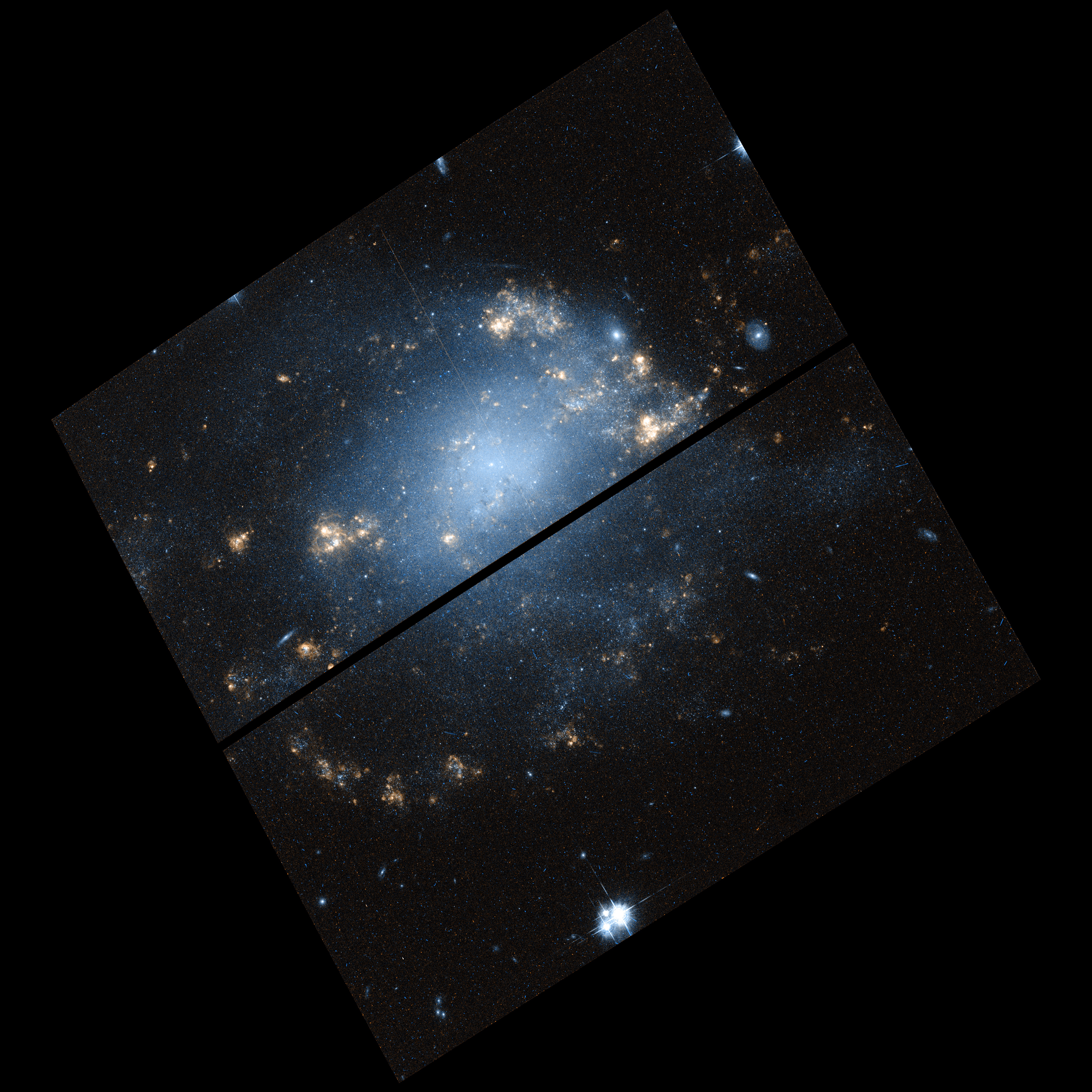
NGC428 by Hubble Space Telescope

NGC 428 was discovered by William Herschel in December 1786. Smoker et al. reported in 1996 on the NGC 428 field, with the HI tail and LSB dwarf 0110+008, assessing star formation properties based on molecule density distributions, and concluded that the tail formation most likely originated through tidal interactions between two galaxies.

== Supernova ==
One supernova has been observed in NGC 428:

- SN 2013ct (Type Ia, mag. 12.2) was discovered by Stuart Parker of the Backyard Observatory Supernova Search (BOSS) project in Australia and New Zealand, on May 11, 2013.

== See also ==
- Galaxy merger
- List of galaxies
