= NGC 2992 =

Seyfert galaxy in the constellation Hydra

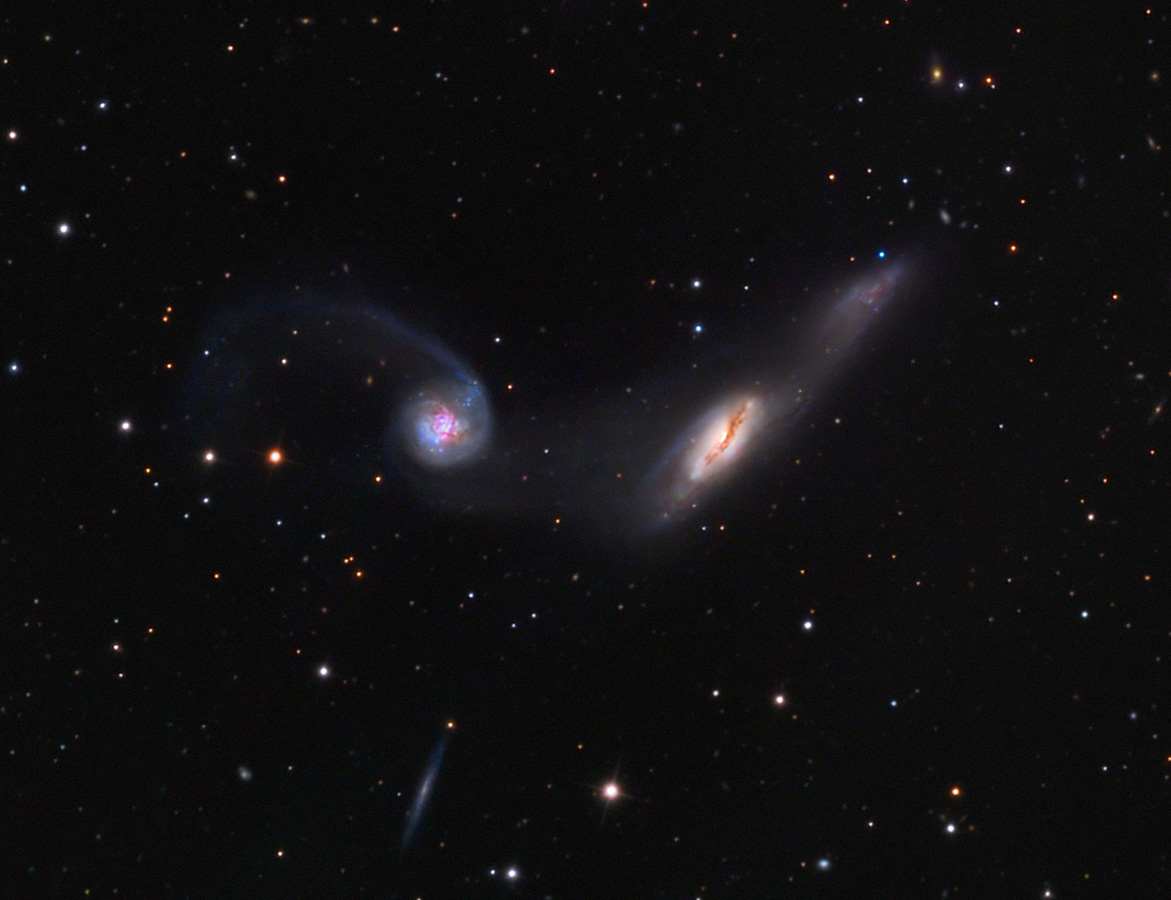
- NGC 2992 (right) with its partner, NGC 2993 (left)

Observation data (J2000 epoch)
- Constellation: Hydra
- Right ascension: 09^{h} 45^{m} 42.045^{s}
- Declination: −14° 19′ 34.90″
- Redshift: 0.00771
- Heliocentric radial velocity: 2,311 km/s
- Distance: 103 Mly (31.6 Mpc)
- Apparent magnitude (V): 12.2

Characteristics
- Type: Sa
- Mass: 55.7×10^{9} M_{☉}
- Apparent size (V): 3.24′ × 0.91′

Other designations
- 2MASX J09454204-1419348, NGC 2992, LEDA 27982, PGC 27982

NGC 2992 is a Seyfert galaxy located 103 million light years distant in the equatorial constellation of Hydra. It was discovered in 1785 by Anglo-German astronomer William Herschel.

The morphological classification of this galaxy is Sa, indicating a spiral with no central bar. The plane of the galaxy is inclined at an angle of 70° to the line of sight from the Earth, so it is being viewed from nearly edge on. A prominent dust lane extends along the major axis, crossing the nucleus. This was identified as a Seyfert galaxy in 1980 based on a broad component of the Hα line with no matching Hβ broadening. It is classed as an intermediate Seyfert of type 1.9/1.5. Varying emission in the x-ray and other bands have been detected from the nucleus of NGC 2992, which may be the result of changes to an accretion disk in the core. These fluctuations show changes by a factor of up to 20 on a time scales of days or weeks. The mass of the central supermassive black hole is estimated to be 5.2×10^{7} M_{☉}.

The nearby companion galaxy NGC 2993 is located less than 3′ to the southeast of NGC 2292. The two are linked by a tidal bridge of ionized hydrogen and there are tidal tails to the southeast of NGC 2993 and the north of NGC 2292. The encounter between these galaxies may be the trigger for the active nucleus in NGC 2992. There is a significant amount of dust obscuring the nucleus and cones of material outflowing from the core at nearly right angles to the alignment of the galaxy. NuSTAR observations suggest there is an ultra-fast outflow component with a velocity of 0.21±0.01 c.
