= PHL 909 =

Low-redshift quasar and Seyfert 1 galaxy in the constellation Pisces

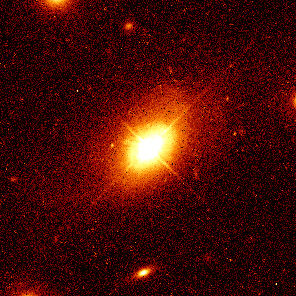
- HST image of PHL 909.

Observation data (J2000.0 epoch)
- Constellation: Pisces
- Right ascension: 00^{h} 57^{m} 09.934^{s}
- Declination: +14° 46′ 10.170″
- Redshift: 0.171754
- Heliocentric radial velocity: 51,491 km/s
- Distance: 2.187 Gly
- Apparent magnitude (B): 16.56

Characteristics
- Type: E4 AGN
- Size: ~228,700 ly (70.11 kpc) (estimated)

Other designations
- SDSS J005709.92+144610.1, SDSS J005709+144607, 2E 0233, 1ES 0054+145, 2MASS J00570992+1446102

PHL 909 is a low-redshift quasar as well as a Seyfert 1 galaxy located in the constellation of Pisces. The redshift of the object is (z) 0.171, meaning it is located approximately 2.1 billion light-years from Earth. It was first discovered in 1978 by astronomers and is classified as radio-quiet.

== Description ==
PHL 909 is classified as a normal type E4 elliptical galaxy with a visual magnitude of 15.7. Based on imaging by Hubble Space Telescope, it is described as having a featureless and smooth appearance with the inner region displaying a higher surface brightness on one side. There is also evidence of a tidal bridge between the host and its western companion galaxy, indicating they might be interacting. It appears it also belongs to a galaxy group, given there are several other galaxies within the region, including a large spiral galaxy located at the same redshift. There is also evidence of either ongoing or recent star-formation in the host with a population of old and intermediate stars.

It appears PHL 909 is a product of several galaxy mergers. Observation of its structure showed the presence of two shell features located at position angles of 328° and 298°. A ring-like structure is present around the galaxy's nucleus with another ring feature formed by diffuse outer material. There are also two tidal tails in the galaxy, one shown extending from a disk-like structure southeast and the other from a disk northwest. The western tidal tail is extending towards the direction of the companion as well, with it also showing the same tidal tail features. Further evidence also showed the eastern tidal tail is connecting to a dwarf galaxy located 14 arcseconds away from PHL 909.

PHL 909 contains hydroxide emission. When studied, the emission is shown to have a signal with a flux density of 60 ± 12 mJy and the isotopic luminosity of the source estimated as 0.8×10^{4} L_{☉}. The galaxy also shows the presence of narrow components in both Balmer and Magnesium emission line profiles, with a small observed redshift of its narrow permitted lines. It is noted there were also changes in these lines between 1980 and 1986, suggesting the production of a narrow Balmer component inside a jet-like structure in the galaxy. A supermassive black hole mass has been estimated as 7.94×10^{8} M_{☉} based on maser kinematics with a bolometric luminosity of 45.47 erg s^{−1}. Later studies estimated a black hole mass of 3.80^{+0.56}_{−0.49}×10^{8} M_{☉}.
