= NGC 3509 =

Galaxy in the constellation Leo

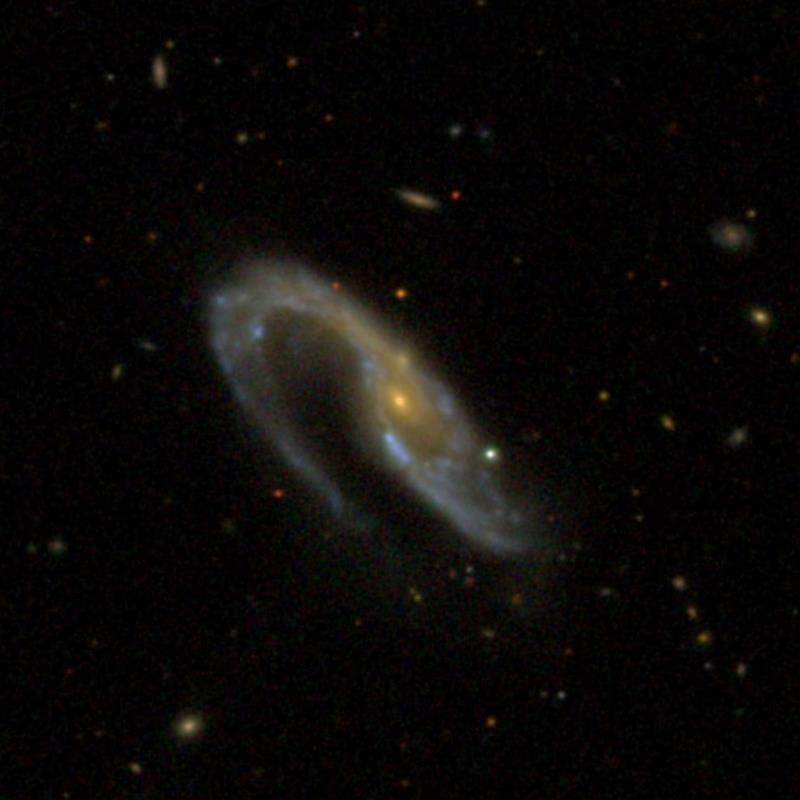
- SDSS image of NGC 3509

Observation data (J2000 epoch)
- Constellation: Leo
- Right ascension: 11h 04m 23.554s
- Declination: +04d 49m 43.03s
- Redshift: 0.025594
- Heliocentric radial velocity: 7,673 km/s
- Distance: 340 Mly (104.2 Mpc)
- Apparent magnitude (V): 13.53

Characteristics
- Type: SA(s)bc pec, SBbc
- Size: 215,000 ly
- Notable features: interacting galaxy with a tidal tail feature

Other designations
- PGC 33446, UGC 6134, VV 075, CGCG 038-109, MCG +01-28-033, ARP 335, IRAS 11018+0505, KPG 265, 2MASX J11042356+0449428, SDSS J110423.55+044943.0, LDCE 0775 NED02, NVSS J110423+044941, AKARI J1104240+044950, LEDA 33446

NGC 3509 known as Arp 335, is a barred spiral galaxy located in the constellation Leo. It is located 340 million light-years from the Solar System. NGC 3509 was discovered by astronomer William Herschel on December 30, 1786.

== Characteristics ==
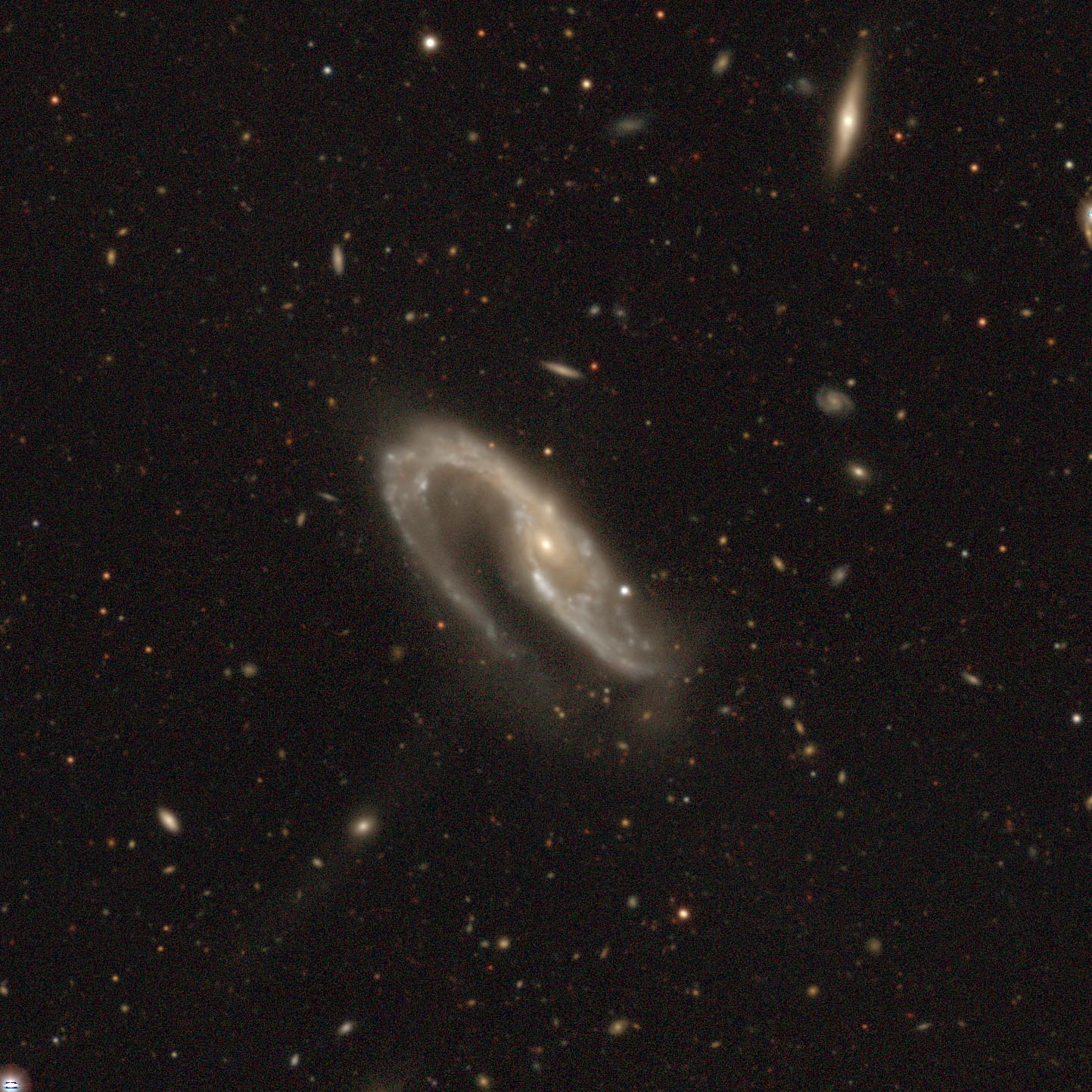
NGC 3509 by DECam

NGC 3509 is a large galaxy. With a diameter of 215,000 light-years, it is much bigger than the Milky Way, which only has a diameter of at least 100,000 light-years. Its luminosity class is II-III and it has a broad HII region.

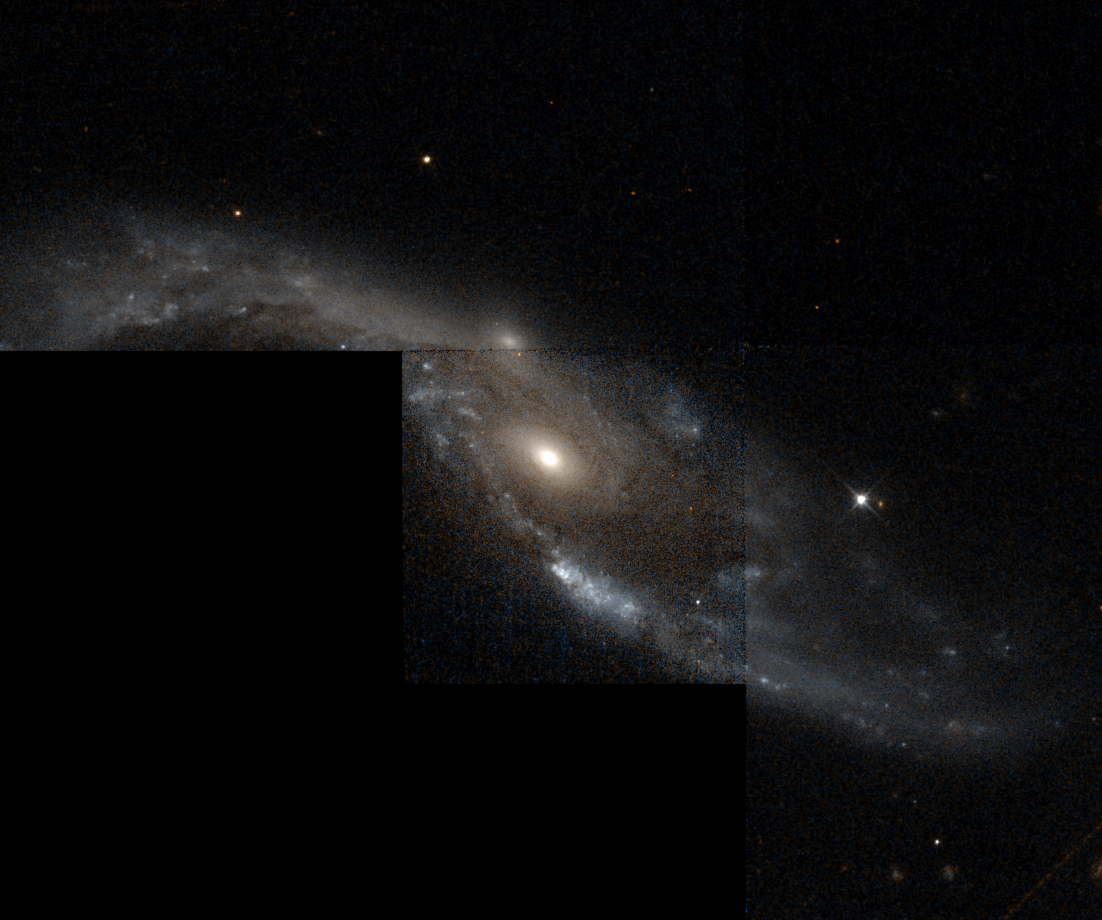
Hubble Space Telescope image of NGC 3509

Additionally, NGC 3509 is a peculiar galaxy showing an interesting detail. It has a sweeping tidal tail feature, which seems to offer hints of evolution and makes the galaxy resemble a tadpole. According to a sketch drew by Toomre, a large tail of NGC 3509 is seen curved towards northwest while the shorter one extends southwest. Later investigations proved him wrong as it is actually a bright ridge of the galaxy's disk structure.

NGC 3509 has a single undisturbed nucleus which is surrounded by dust lanes. This means it has not undergone a major disk-to-disk merger and instead had a minor merger with a smaller satellite galaxy. As the galaxy interaction between NGC 3509 and the galaxy occurs, certain starbursts are triggered in regions along its spiral arms which causes it to actively create new stars. It is also evident, NGC 3509 contain signs of neutral hydrogen.

Another study proves that a galactic halo is growing in NGC 3509 through accretion of smaller galaxies, in which they leave a spur behind as they are tidally disrupted by their host galaxy.

NGC 3509 is designated as Arp 335 in the Atlas of Peculiar Galaxies by Halton Arp, in which it is placed into the Miscellaneous category, M82 being the well-known galaxy in this classification.

== Supernova ==
One supernova has been discovered in NGC 3509: SN 2010bi.

=== SN 2010bi ===
SN 2010bi was discovered on March 24, 2010, by G. Piginata and M. Cifuentes along with other astronomers from University of North Carolina at Chapel Hill on the behalf of the CHASE project (CHilean Automatic Supernova sEarch). SN 2010bi was found via an unfiltered image taken using the 0.41-m 'PROMPT 5' telescope located at Cerro Tololo. It was located 28".4 east and 34".6 north of the nucleus. The supernova was Type IIP in which its progenitor might be a 8-16 solar mass red supergiant.

== See also ==
- List of NGC objects (3001-4000)
- List of NGC objects
