= Tadpole Galaxy =

Galaxy in the constellation Draco

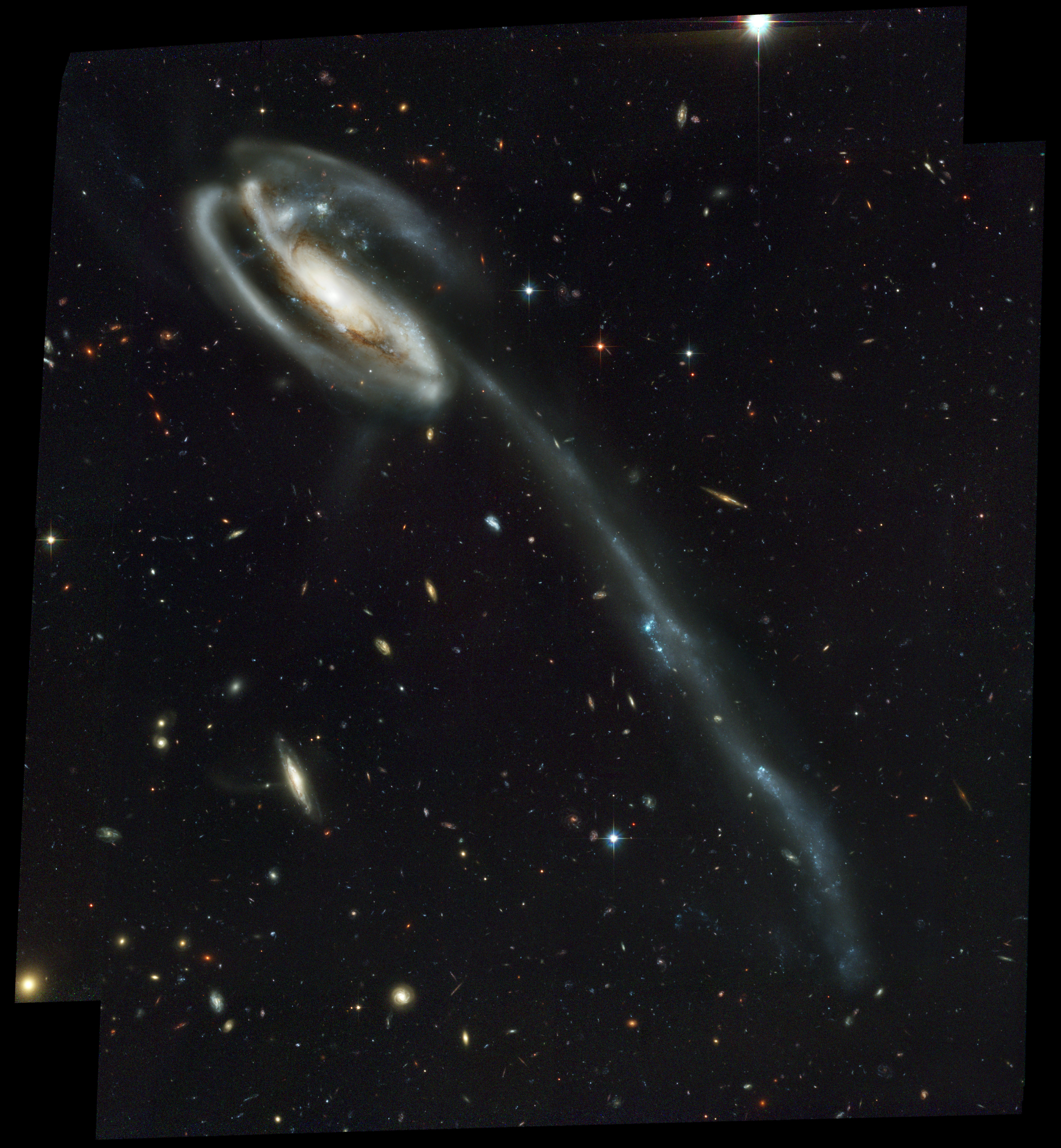
- The Tadpole Galaxy imaged by the Hubble Space Telescope's Advanced Camera for Surveys

Observation data (J2000 epoch)
- Constellation: Draco
- Right ascension: 16^{h} 06^{m} 03.908^{s}
- Declination: +55° 25′ 31.588″
- Redshift: 0.031112±0.000010
- Heliocentric radial velocity: 9,327±3 km/s
- Galactocentric velocity: 9,496±7 km/s
- Distance: 468.4 ± 32.62 Mly (143.6 ± 10.0 Mpc)h^{−1}_{0.6774} (Comoving); 440 Mly (134.9 Mpc)h^{−1}_{0.6774} (Light-travel)
- Apparent magnitude (V): 14.6
- Apparent magnitude (B): 15.0
- Magnitude (J): 11.525±0.029
- Magnitude (H): 10.864±0.038
- Magnitude (K): 10.592±0.047

Characteristics
- Type: SB(s)c pec
- Size: 558,410 ly × 111,680 ly (171.21 kpc × 34.24 kpc) (diameter; 25.0 B-mag arcsec^{−2}) (Note: The quoted diameter in this infobox was based on NED's provided scale "Virgo + GA + Shapley" of 696 parsecs/arcsec multiplied with given angular diameters.); 215,260 ly × 95,857 ly (66 kpc × 29.39 kpc) (diameter; "total" magnitude)
- Apparent size (V): 3.6′ × 0.8′
- Notable features: Collided galaxy

Other designations
- IRAS F16049+5533, 2MASX J16060394+5525313, Arp 188, UGC 10214, MCG +09-26-056, PGC 57129, CGCG 275-023, VV 29

The Tadpole Galaxy, also known as UGC 10214 and Arp 188, is a disrupted barred spiral galaxy located 143.6 megaparsecs (468.4 million light-years) from Earth in the northern constellation Draco. The first known reference to this galaxy comes from the 1959 Vorontsov-Vel'yaminov Interacting Galaxies catalog, where it was listed as VV 29.

The Tadpole Galaxy's most dramatic feature is a trail of stars, and it has a D_{25.0} isophotal diameter of 171 kiloparsecs (558,000 light-years) long. Its size has been attributed to a merger with a smaller galaxy that is believed to have occurred about 100 million years ago. The galaxy is filled with bright blue star clusters triggered by the merger, some containing as many as one million stars. It is one of the largest known disrupted spiral galaxies of its sort.

It is hypothesized that a more compact intruder galaxy crossed in front of the Tadpole Galaxy—from left to right from the perspective of Earth—and was slung around behind the Tadpole by their mutual gravitational attraction. During this close encounter, tidal forces drew out the spiral galaxy's stars, gases and dust, forming the conspicuous tail. The intruder galaxy, estimated to lie about 300,000 light-years behind the Tadpole, can be seen through foreground spiral arms at the upper left. Following its terrestrial namesake, the Tadpole Galaxy will likely lose its tail as it grows older; the tail's star clusters forming smaller satellites of the large spiral galaxy.

An image of the galaxy was taken by Hubble's Advanced Camera for Surveys (ACS) in April 2002, containing 6000 background galaxies spanning billions of light-years.

== Supernovae ==
Two supernovae have been observed in the Tadpole Galaxy:

- SN 2007cu (Type II, mag. 18.9) was discovered by the Lick Observatory Supernova Search (LOSS) on June 27, 2007.
- SN 2008dq (Type Ic, mag. 18.3) was discovered by LOSS on June 25, 2008.

== See also ==
- NGC 6872
- NGC 262
- Antennae Galaxies
- Mice Galaxies
