= NGC 3786 =

Galaxy in the constellation Ursa Major

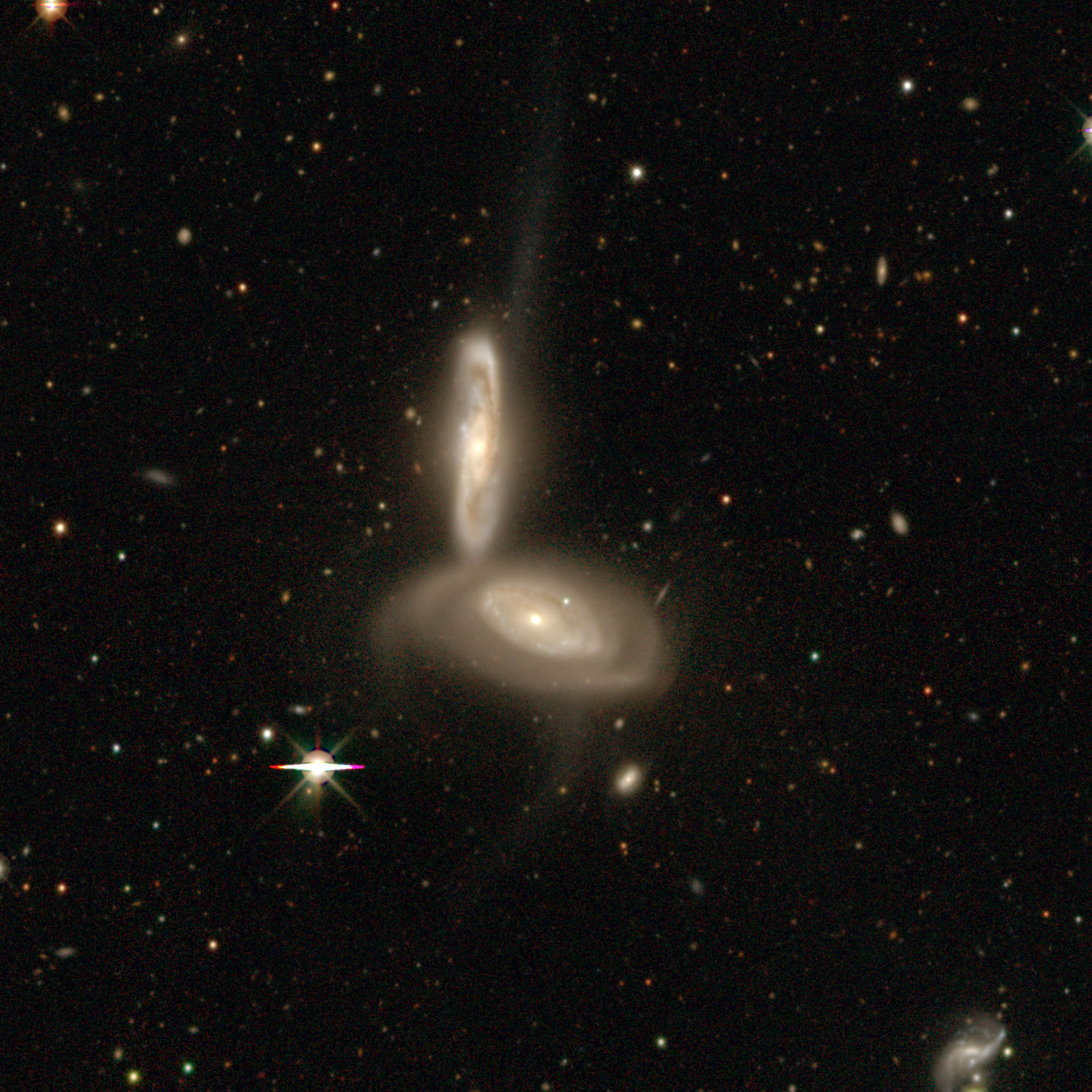
- legacy surveys image of NGC 3786 (center), with NGC 3788 at top

Observation data (J2000 epoch)
- Right ascension: 11^{h} 39^{m} 42.512^{s}
- Declination: +31° 54′ 33.97″
- Redshift: 0.008883
- Distance: 107.5 Mly (32.95 Mpc)
- Apparent magnitude (V): 13.74
- Apparent magnitude (B): 14.62

Characteristics
- Type: (R')SA(rs)a
- Apparent size (V): 1.207′ × 0.627′ (NIR)

Other designations
- NGC 3786, Arp 294, UGC 6621, PGC 36158, Mark 744

NGC 3786 is a spiral galaxy located 107.5 million light-years away from Earth in the constellation of Ursa Major. This galaxy forms a close pair with the peculiar galaxy NGC 3788, showing some indications of interaction such as minor distortions of the disk or tidal features.

It was discovered by English astronomer John Herschel on April 10, 1831.

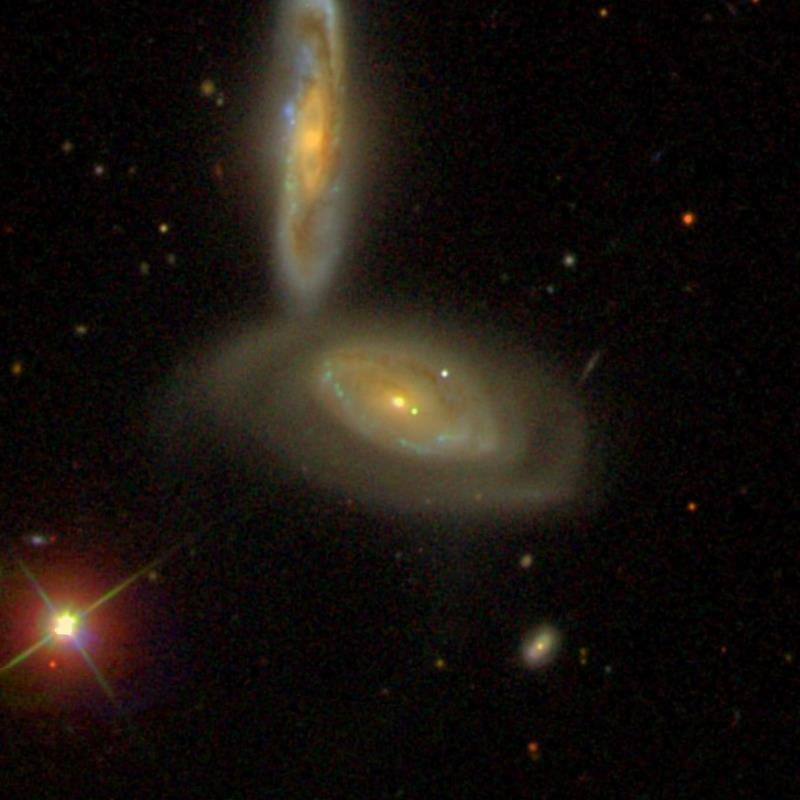
Sloan Digital Sky Survey image of NGC 3786 (center), with NGC 3788 at top

== Description ==
The morphological classification of this galaxy is (R')SA(rs)a, indicating an unbarred spiral galaxy (SA) with an outer ring (R'), transitional inner ring (rs), and tightly wound spiral arms (a). The galactic plane is inclined at an angle of 61°±2° to the line of sight from the Earth. A mini-bar structure appears in the circumnuclear region. It is a type 1.8 Seyfert galaxy, with a detectable X-ray emission that is being partially absorbed by warm, dusty material along the line of sight.

The active galactic nucleus of this galaxy is driven by a supermassive black hole with an estimated mass of 5.0×10^{6} M_{☉}. An outburst from the core was observed in 1996 and a mid-infrared flare in 2022.

== Supernova ==
Type Ic supernova SN 1999bu was detected from an image taken April 16, 1999. It was magnitude 17.5 and was located at an offset 1.3″ west and 3.1″ south of the galactic nucleus of NGC 3786. A possible progenitor to this core collapse supernova event was identified in 2003 from archival images. A second supernova, SN 2004bd, was discovered April 7, 2004. This was a type Ia supernova located 4.7″ west and 1.2″ south of the nucleus.
