= NGC 2623 =

Interacting galaxy in the constellation Cancer

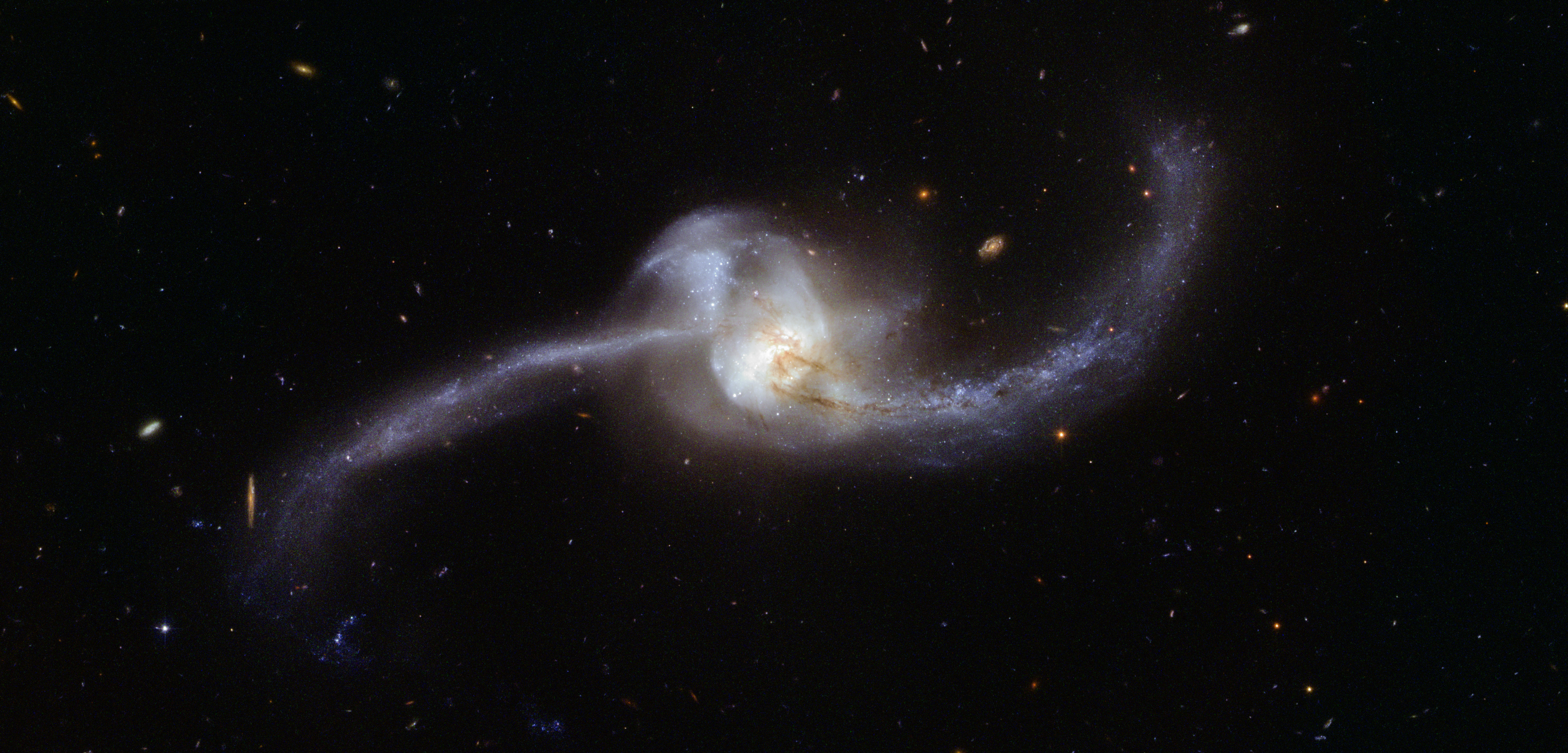
- A Hubble Space Telescope (HST) image of NGC 2623

Observation data (J2000 epoch)
- Constellation: Cancer
- Right ascension: 08^{h} 38^{m} 24.10^{s}
- Declination: +25° 45′ 01.00″
- Redshift: 0.01847
- Distance: 263 Mly (80.91 Mpc)
- Apparent magnitude (V): 13.36

Characteristics
- Type: SABsd
- Size: 196,000 ly
- Apparent size (V): 2.399' x 0.692'
- Notable features: Late stage of collision/merging

Other designations
- NGC 2623, PGC 24288, MCG+04-21-009, UGC 4509, Arp 243

NGC 2623 (also known as ARP 243) is an interacting galaxy located around 263 million light-years away in the constellation Cancer. It was discovered on 19 January 1885 by French astronomer Édouard Jean-Marie Stephan.

Due to NGC 2623 being in the late stage of merging, the compression of the gas within the galaxy has led to a large amount of star formation, and to its unique structure of a bright core with two extending tidal tails. NGC 2623 does not have an active galactic nucleus.

One supernova has been observed in NGC 2623: SN 1999gd (Type Ia, mag. 17.8), discovered on 24 November 1999.

== Characteristics ==
NGC 2623 gained its unusual and distinctive shape as the result of a major collision and subsequent merger between two separate galaxies. This violent encounter caused clouds of gas within the two galaxies to become compressed and stirred up, in turn triggering a sharp spike of star formation. This active star formation is marked by speckled patches of bright blue; these can be seen clustered both in the center and along the trails of dust and gas forming NGC 2623's sweeping curves (known as tidal tails). These tails extend for roughly 50 000 light-years from end to end. Many young, hot, newborn stars form in bright stellar clusters — at least 170 such clusters are known to exist within NGC 2623.

NGC 2623 is in a late stage of merging. It is thought that the Milky Way will eventually resemble NGC 2623 when it collides with our neighboring galaxy, the Andromeda Galaxy, in four billion years time.

Not surprisingly, interacting galaxies have a dramatic effect on each other. Studies have revealed that as galaxies approach one another massive amounts of gas are pulled from each galaxy towards the center of the other, until ultimately, the two merge into one massive galaxy. NGC 2623 is in the late stages of the merging process, with the centers of the original galaxy pair now merged into one nucleus, but stretching out from the center are two tidal tails of young stars, a strong indicator that a merger has taken place. During such a collision, the dramatic exchange of mass and gases initiates star formation, seen here in both the tails.

The prominent lower tail is richly populated with bright star clusters — 100 of them have been found in these observations. These star clusters may have formed as part of a loop of stretched material associated with the northern tail, or they may have formed from debris falling back onto the nucleus. In addition to this active star-forming region, both galactic arms harbor very young stars in the early stages of their evolutionary journey.

=== Properties ===
NGC 2623 spans 50 thousand light years, and the infrared luminosity of this galaxy is 3.3×10^{11} L☉ (solar luminosity). This level of emission is seen in Seyfert galaxies, whose cores are especially bright. The distance modulus is 34.50.

=== Classification ===
The nucleus of this galaxy is filled with many young stars, due to the star formation caused by the merger. Because there is such a large amount, NGC 2623 is classified as a Seyfert galaxy. Seyfert galaxies have very bright cores and similar properties to quasars. Both are nuclei of galaxies that contain active super massive black holes and emit very high levels of energy. Seyfert galaxies, such as NGC 2623, tend to emit a much lower amount of visible light. Seyfert galaxies are relatively uncommon as only 2 percent of spiral galaxies fall under this classification.

=== Star formation ===
In NGC 2623 there are bright star clusters in the tails of the galaxy, and many of them are situated in the upper tail. There are at least 170 star clusters within the galaxy. In addition to this both tails contain many young stars in their respective early stages in evolution. The most active part of the galaxy in regards to star formation is the upper and more prominent tail. Through HST and GALEX, which are two space telescopes, images it is evident that recent star formation has occurred within the galaxy. Though there are many star clusters in the tails of NGC 2623, the nucleus, or center of the galaxy still is responsible for more than 99 percent of the star formation occurring.

=== Tidal tails ===
The large trails of gas on each end of NGC 2623 are known as tidal tails. Tidal tails are long strips of bright star clusters that occur due to the interactions between different galaxies. In the case of this galaxy, the tidal tails are formed due to the merging of the galaxies that formed NGC 2623. Tidal tails are very strong indicators of whether a galaxy has been formed due to the merging of multiple other galaxies. Tidal tails can also be seen in the Antennae galaxy, as they were also formed by the merging of galaxies, similar to how NGC 2623 was formed. Tidal tails are helpful to astronomers as they can indicate the formation and evolution of a galaxy.
