= NGC 3921 =

Interacting galaxy in the constellation Ursa Major

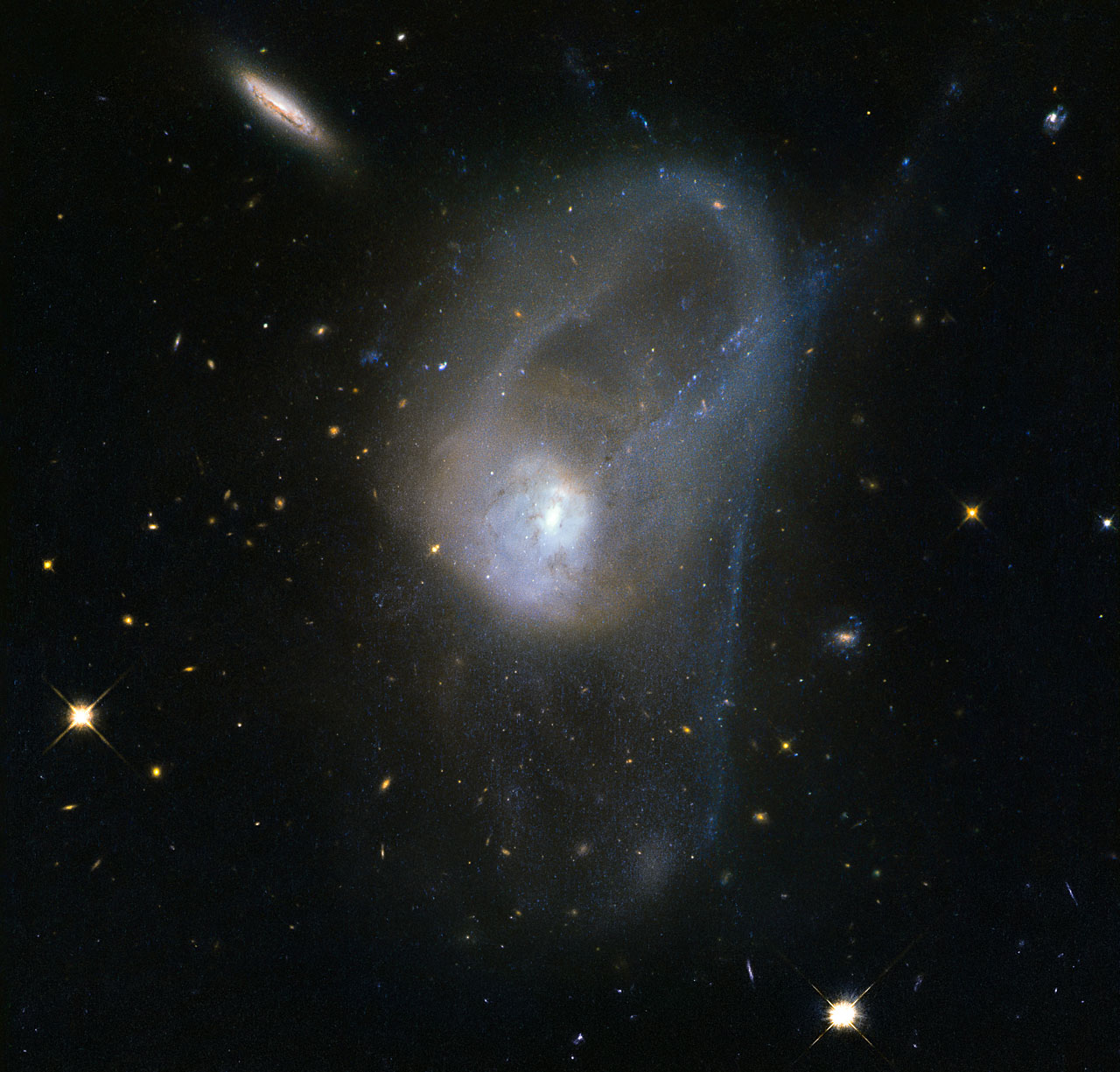
- NGC 3921, imaged by the Hubble Space Telescope

Observation data (J2000 epoch)
- Constellation: Ursa Major
- Right ascension: 11^{h} 51^{m} 06.863^{s}
- Declination: +55° 04′ 43.38″
- Redshift: 0.019667
- Heliocentric radial velocity: 5896 km/s
- Distance: 277.9 Mly (85.19 Mpc)
- Apparent magnitude (V): 12.64
- Apparent magnitude (B): 13.4
- Absolute magnitude (V): −22.09

Characteristics
- Type: (R')SA0/a(s) pec
- Size: 180,200 ly (55,240 pc) (Note: POSS1 103a-O values used.)
- Apparent size (V): 2.1′ × 1.3′

Other designations
- Arp 224, UGC 6823, MGC+09-20-009, PGC 37063

NGC 3921 is an interacting galaxy in the northern constellation of Ursa Major. Estimates using redshift put it at about 59 million light years (18 megaparsecs) from Earth. It was discovered on 14 April 1789 by William Herschel, and was described as "pretty faint, small, round" by John Louis Emil Dreyer, the compiler of the New General Catalogue.

NGC 3921 is the remnant of a galaxy merger. The two progenitor galaxies are thought to have been disk galaxies that collided about 700 million years ago. The image shows noticeable star formation and structures like loops, indicative of galaxies interacting. Because of this, NGC 3921 was included in Halton Arp's Atlas of Peculiar Galaxies under the designation Arp 224.

Being a starburst galaxy, NGC 3921 has important features. One of them is an ultraluminous X-ray source, designated X-2, with an X-ray luminosity of 8×10^{39} erg/s. Additionally, two candidate globular clusters have been detected within NGC 3921. They are both fairly young, and about half as massive as Omega Centauri, demonstrating that mergers of gas-rich galaxies can also create more metal-rich globular clusters.
