= Arp 273 =

Pair of interacting galaxies in the constellation Andromeda

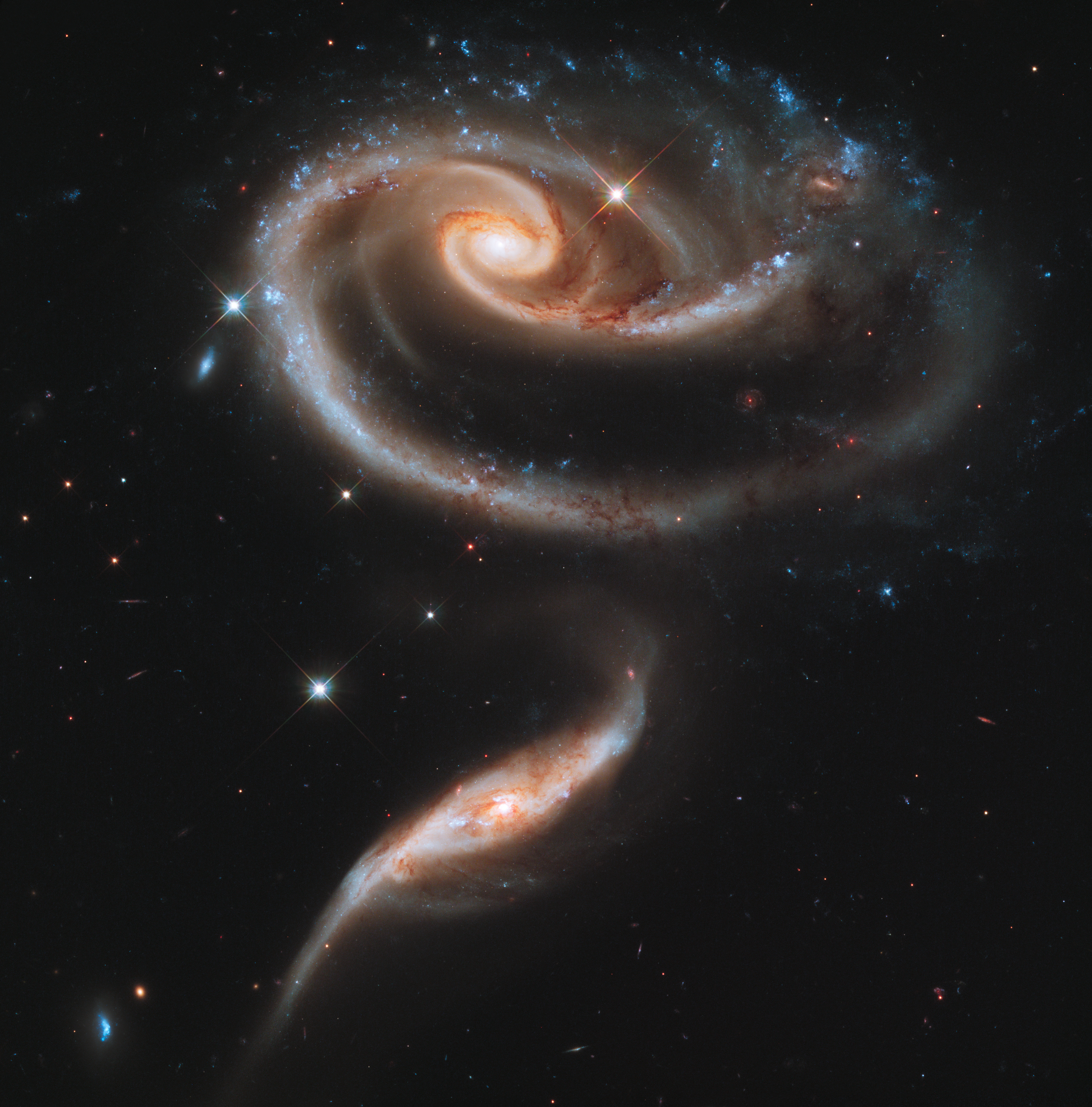
- Image taken by the NASA/ESA Hubble Space Telescope shows Arp 273, a pair of interacting galaxies.

Observation data (J2000 epoch)
- Constellation: Andromeda
- Right ascension: 02^{h} 21^{m} 28.703^{s}
- Declination: +39° 22′ 32.65″
- Distance: 300 million ly
- Apparent magnitude (V): 13.7

Characteristics
- Type: SA(s)b pec + SB(s)a pec

Other designations
- Z 523-28, Z 0218.4+3909, CGPG 0218.4+3909, ZW V 223, KPG 64a, UZC J022128.6+392231, 2MASX J02212870+3922326, Arp 273, UGC 1810, MCG +06-06-023, PGC 8961, VV 323, VV 323a

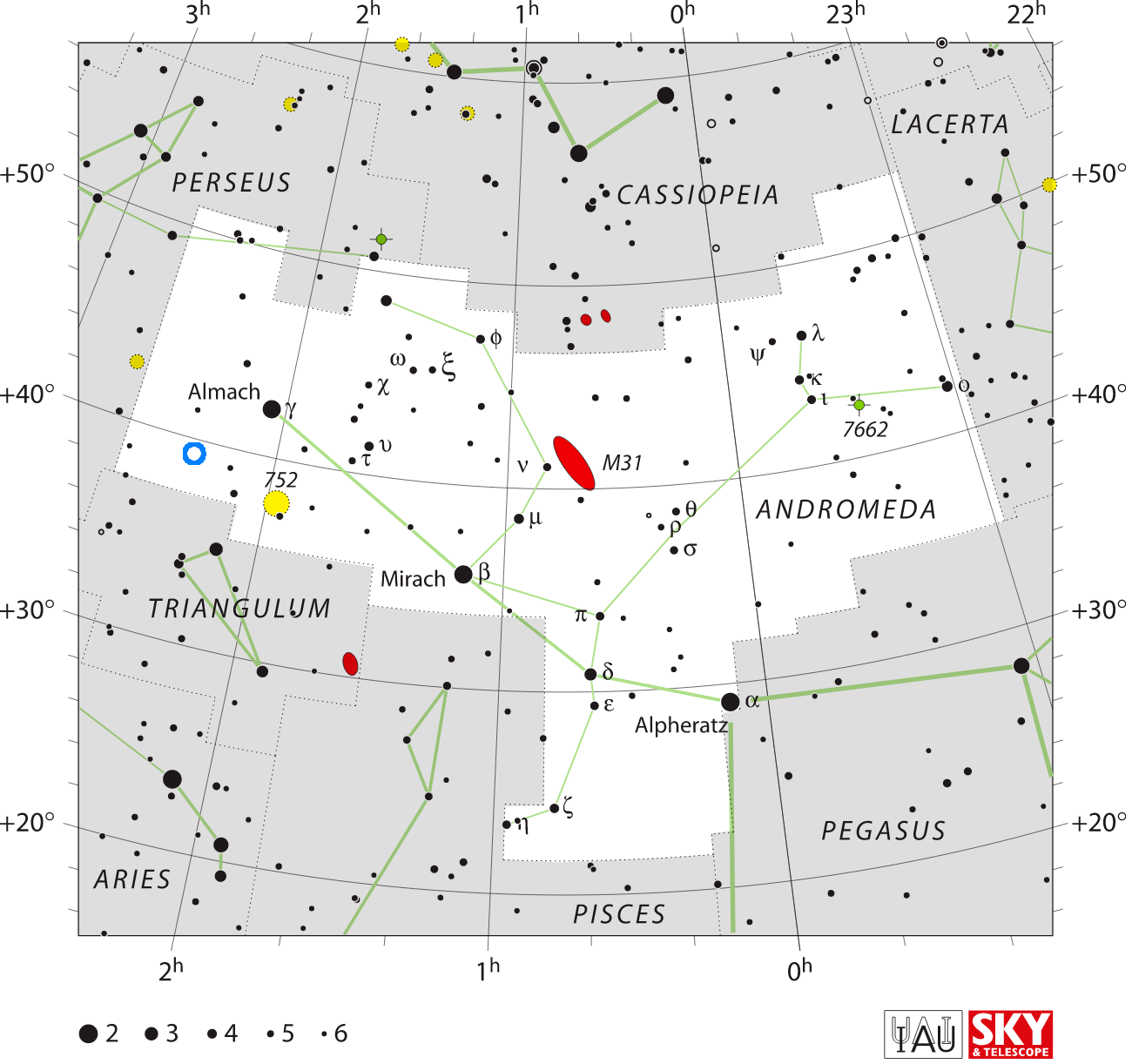
The location of Arp 273 (circled in blue)

Arp 273 zoom sequence.

Arp 273 is a pair of interacting galaxies, 300 million light years away in the constellation Andromeda. It was first described in the Atlas of Peculiar Galaxies, compiled by Halton Arp in 1966. The larger of the spiral galaxies, known as UGC 1810, is about five times more massive than the smaller galaxy. It has a disc that is tidally distorted into a rose-like shape by the gravitational pull of the companion galaxy below it, known as UGC 1813. The smaller galaxy shows distinct signs of active star formation at its nucleus, and "it is thought that the smaller galaxy has actually passed through the larger one."

One supernova has been observed in UGC 1810: SN 1962R (type unknown, mag. 15.9) was discovered on plates taken at the Lick Observatory in December 1962, and presumed to be of Type II.
