= Tidal tail =

Elongated structure composed of stars and gas that extends from a galaxy

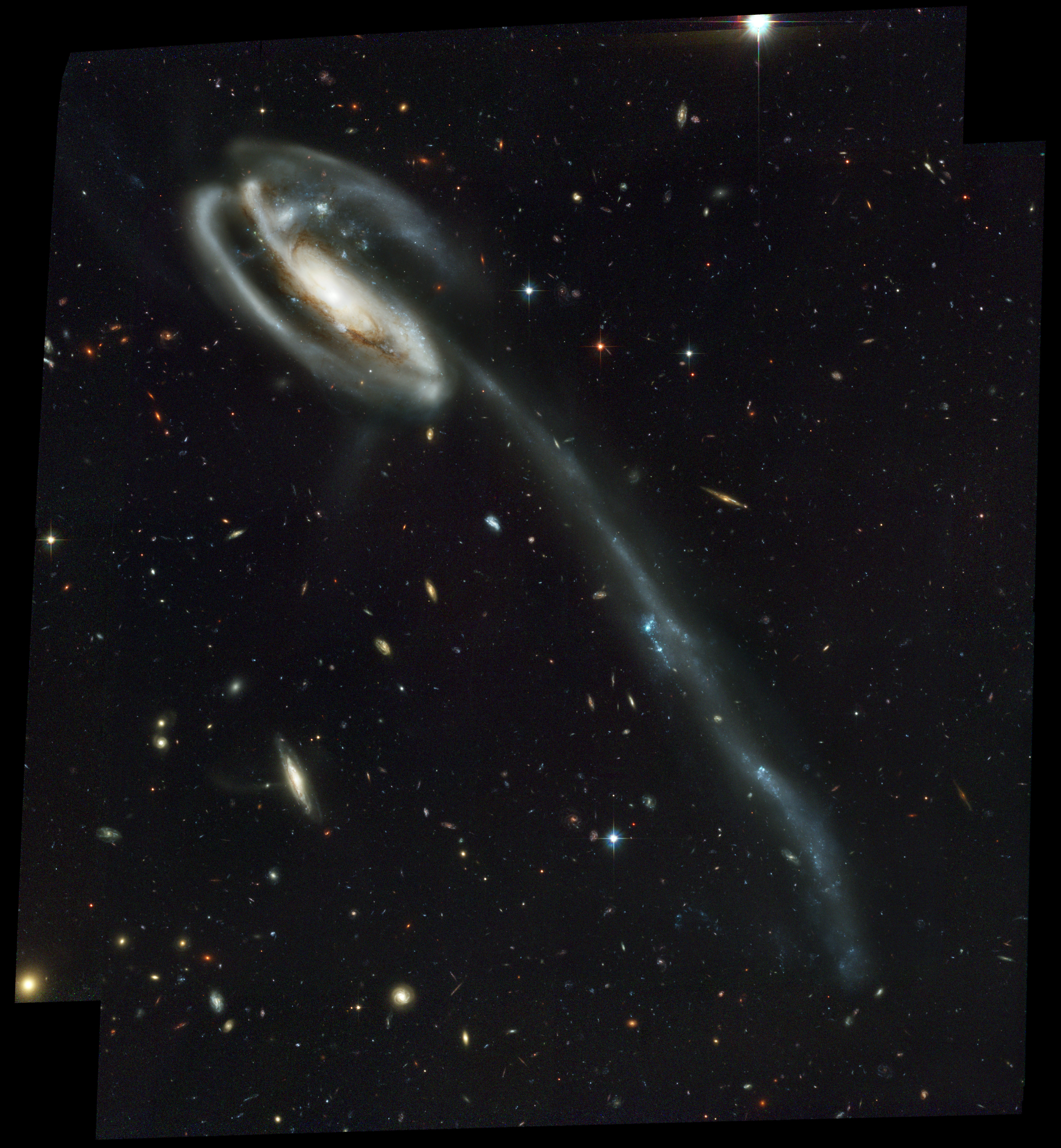
The Tadpole Galaxy, image taken by the Hubble Space Telescope's ACS.

A tidal tail is a thin, elongated region of stars and interstellar gas that extends into space from a galaxy. Tidal tails occur as a result of galactic tide forces between interacting galaxies. Examples of galaxies with tidal tails include the Tadpole Galaxy and the Mice Galaxies. Tidal forces can eject a significant amount of a galaxy's gas into the tail; within the Antennae Galaxies, for example, nearly half of the observed gaseous matter is found within the tail structures.

== History ==
The phenomena now referred to as tidal tails were first studied extensively by Fritz Zwicky in 1953. Several astrophysicists expressed their doubts that these extensions could occur solely as the result of tidal forces, including Zwicky himself, who described his own views as "unorthodox". Boris Vorontsov-Velyaminov argued that the tails were too thin and too long to have been produced by gravity alone, as gravity should instead produce broad distortions. However, in 1972, renowned astronomer Alar Toomre modeled close encounters of disk galaxies using three-body (test-particle) simulations and proved that tidal perturbations produce tail structures in interacting systems. that it was indeed tidal forces that were responsible for the tails.

== Structure ==
=== Morphology ===
When galaxies interact, the uneven tidal forces between the galaxies can pull matter away from the galactic disks forming tidal tails. Galaxy surveys have found the longest tidal tails can extend farther than 100 kpc from a galaxy, however, most tidal tails surveyed were 10-20 kpc. The shapes of tidal tails can be fit into three broad categories: straight, curved, and plume (formed by the dispersion of tail materials that have gravitated back to the galaxy).

The structure of tidal tails depends on the geometry of encountered galaxies. When the spin of a galactic disk is aligned with the direction of orbital motion, interactions usually generate long and prominent tidal tails. When the disk rotation opposes the orbital motion, tidal features tend to be weaker. Some interacting galaxy pairs have two distinct tails, as is the case for the Antennae Galaxies, while other systems have only one tail. The mass ratio between the interacting galaxies can influence how many tidal tails form and how symmetric they appear. Gravitational torques transmitting during close passages transfer angular momentum outward, causing material from the outer disk to move far from the center of the galaxy.

=== Gas content ===
Tidal tails (and other tidal features) are found to have a gas content primarily composed of atomic hydrogen (HI), however, regions of molecular hydrogen (H_{2}), traced by CO, are sometimes found in areas of proportionally high densities of HI. Additionally, it is found that tidal tails tend to have low metallicity and dust content, which decrease exponentially at increasing distances from the galaxy.

=== Stellar composition ===
Along with the stars pulled out or created by tidal effects, tidal tails have also been found to have active star forming regions with similar properties to those found in galactic disks. Star clusters, including active regions, can be generally found throughout the whole length of the tail. In galaxies with tidal tails, the tails harbor approximately 10% of the galaxy's stellar formation. Overall, roughly 1% of all stellar formation in the known universe occurs within tidal tails.

== Observational properties ==
Most images show that many nearby disk galaxies host extended and faint tidal structures. Identifying the tidal tails can be limited by background modelling and imaging artifacts in data. Tidal tails are a common outcome of gravitational interactions between disk galaxies. Neutral hydrogen can trace tidal debris farther out than the optical light. Star-forming condensations in tidal debris can tend to be tidal dwarf galaxies during the approach.

== Tidal tails of clusters ==
Tidal tails have been observed in clusters as well as galaxies. There have been tidal tails identified around NGC 5466. These tails appear to be roughly 4 degrees in the sky, or 1 kpc in length. There have been other clusters observed with tidal tails as well,

- NGC 2516, from tip of leading tail to tip of trailing tail, 380 pc.
- Theia 456 (COIN-Gaia 13), tidal tail spans 200 pc.
- NGC 752, estimates are less than 1.5 kpc to several kpc.
- ASCC 101, trailing tail is 100 pc, leading tail is hard to measure due to its position.
- Alessi 3, leading tail 120 pc, trailing tail 60 pc.
- Blanco 1, both tails extend approximately 50-60 pc.
- Collinder 350, both tails extend approximately 50pc.
- Melotte 111, both tails span 50 pc.
- Melotte 25, leading tail is 70 pc, trailing tail is 70 pc.
- Roslund 6, both tails extend approximately 100 pc.
- Theia 517, leading tail is 120 pc and trailing tail is 150 pc.

These tidal tails are difficult to measure and different studies show different results. We can most accurately measure tidal tails close to Earth and in the correct orientation.

== Gallery ==
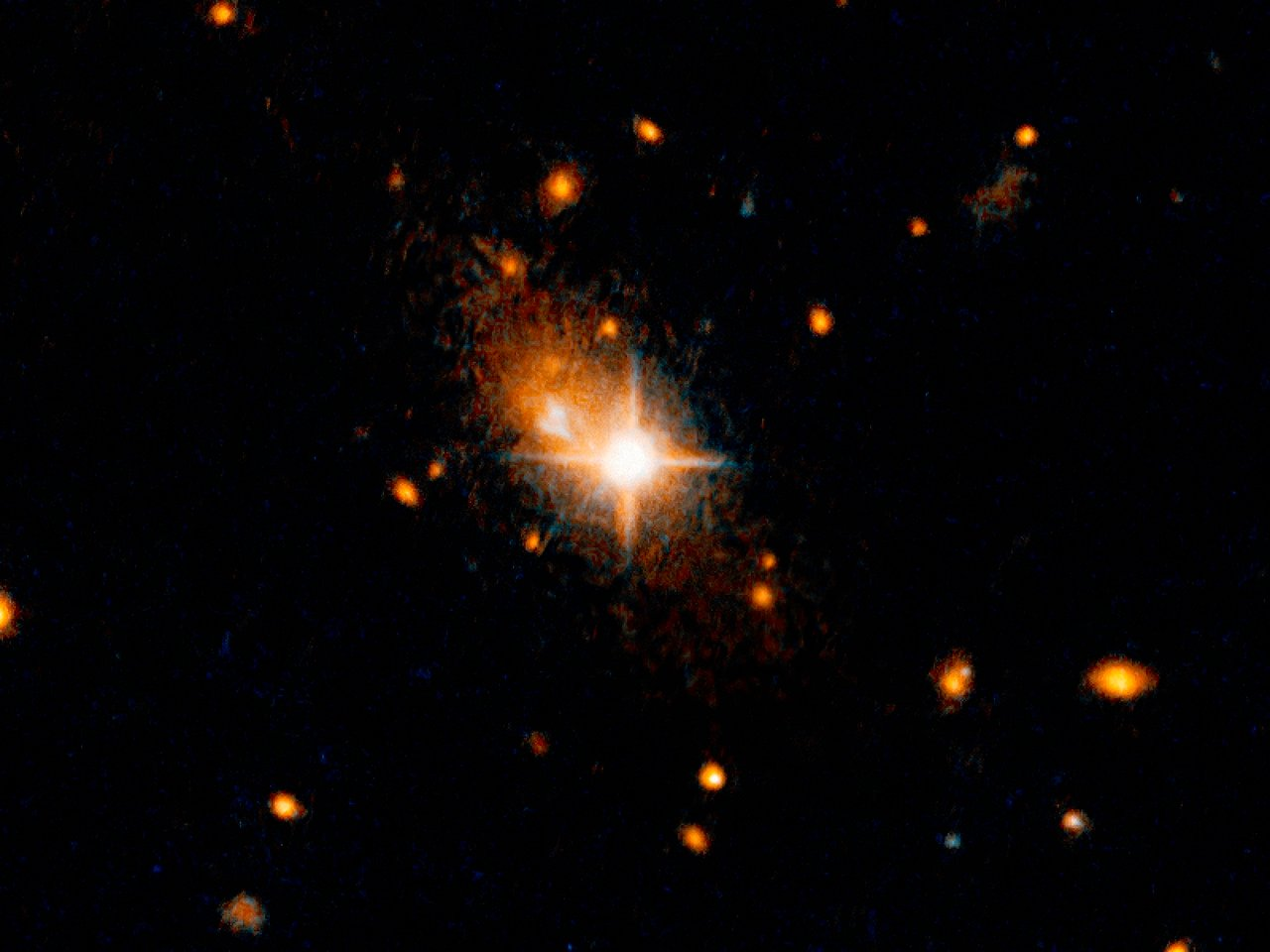
Arc-shaped tidal tails in galaxy 3C186.
