= Galaxy merger =

Merger whereby at least two galaxies collide

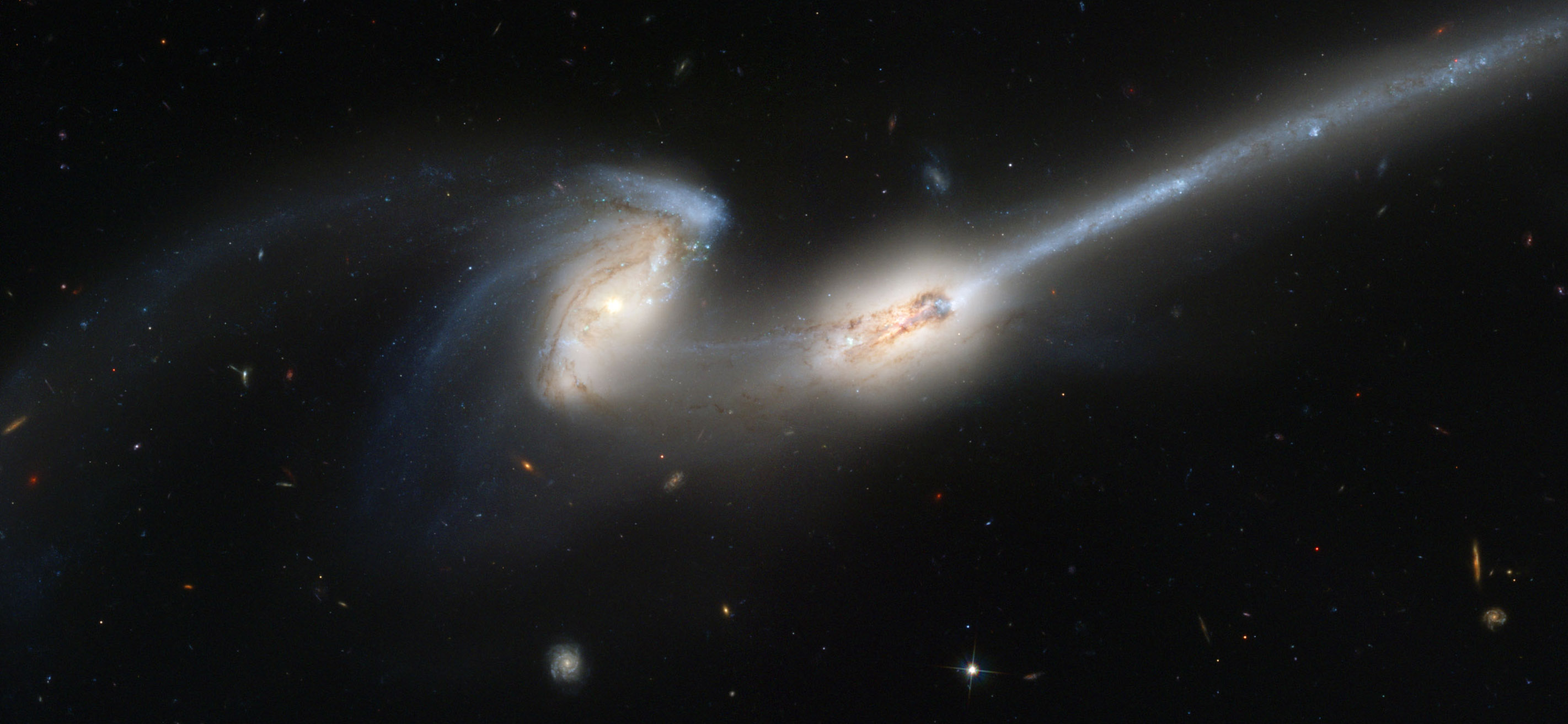
The Mice Galaxies (NGC 4676 A&B) are in the process of merging.

Galaxy mergers can occur when two (or more) galaxies collide. They are the most violent type of galaxy interaction. The gravitational interactions between galaxies and the friction between the gas and dust have major effects on the galaxies involved, but the exact effects of such mergers depend on a wide variety of parameters such as collision angles, speeds, and relative size/composition, and are currently an extremely active area of research. Galaxy mergers are important because the merger rate is a fundamental measurement of galaxy evolution and also provides astronomers with clues about how galaxies grew into their current forms over long stretches of time.

== Description ==
During the merger, stars and dark matter in each galaxy become affected by the approaching galaxy. Toward the late stages of the merger, the gravitational potential begins changing so quickly that star orbits are greatly altered, and lose any trace of their prior orbit. This process is called “violent relaxation”. For example, when two disk galaxies collide they begin with their stars in an orderly rotation in the planes of the two separate disks. During the merger, that ordered motion is transformed into random energy (“thermalized”). The resultant galaxy is dominated by stars that orbit the galaxy in a complicated and random interacting network of orbits, which is what is observed in elliptical galaxies.

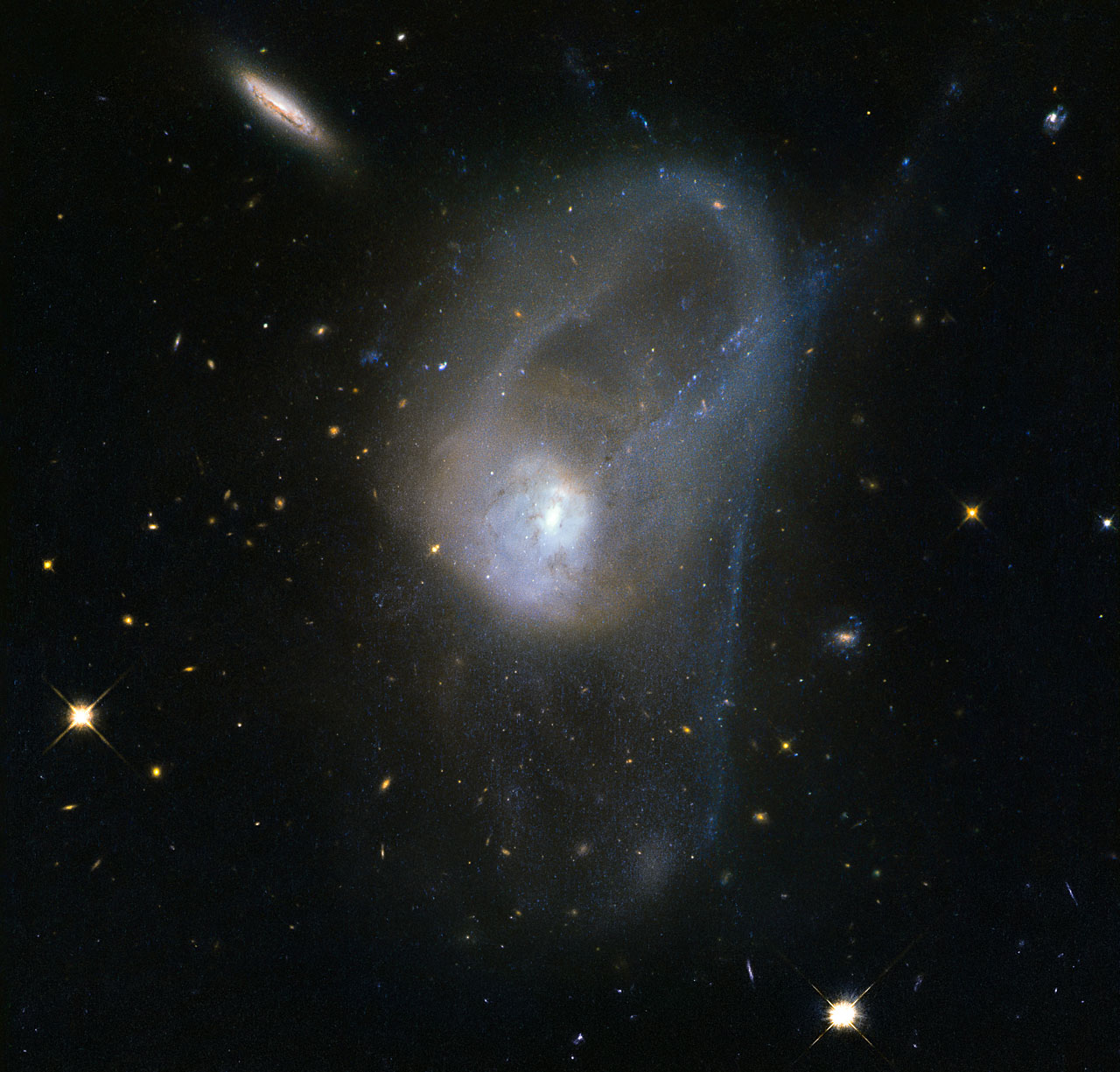
NGC 3921 is an interacting pair of disc galaxies in the late stages of its merger.

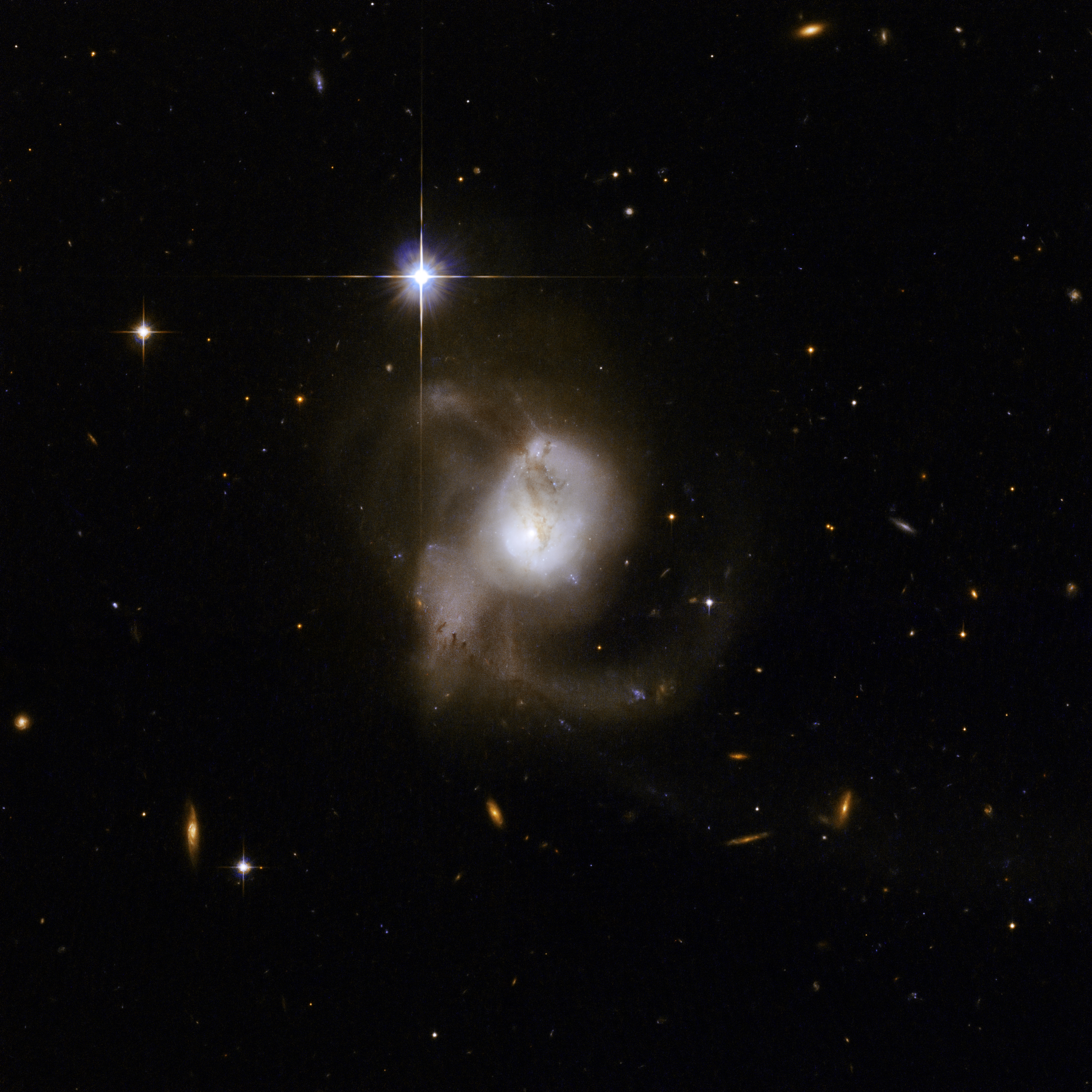
ESO 239-2, an interacting pair of galaxies located 550 million light-years in the constellation of Grus. These galaxies are currently in the last stages of merging which the end result would be an elliptical galaxy.

Mergers are also locations of extreme amounts of star formation. The star formation rate (SFR) during a major merger can reach thousands of solar masses worth of new stars each year, depending on the gas content of each galaxy and its redshift. Typical merger SFRs are less than 100 new solar masses per year. This is large compared to our Galaxy, which makes only a few new stars each year (~2 new stars). Though stars almost never get close enough to actually collide in galaxy mergers, giant molecular clouds rapidly fall to the center of the galaxy where they collide with other molecular clouds. These collisions then induce condensations of these clouds into new stars. We can see this phenomenon in merging galaxies in the nearby universe. Yet, this process was more pronounced during the mergers that formed most elliptical galaxies we see today, which likely occurred 1–10 billion years ago, when there was much more gas (and thus more molecular clouds) in galaxies. Also, away from the center of the galaxy, gas clouds will run into each other, producing shocks which stimulate the formation of new stars in gas clouds. The result of all this violence is that galaxies tend to have little gas available to form new stars after they merge. Thus if a galaxy is involved in a major merger, and then a few billion years pass, the galaxy will have very few young stars (see Stellar evolution) left. This is what we see in today's elliptical galaxies, very little molecular gas and very few young stars. It is thought that this is because elliptical galaxies are the end products of major mergers which use up the majority of gas during the merger, and thus further star formation after the merger is quenched. This is the phase we call post-starbursts phase, also known as PSB phase. Although PSB phase can be triggered by multiple causes, galaxy merger of redshift around 0~2 is the most frequent cause of this phase and it can rapidly quench star formation than any other phenomenon in the universe.

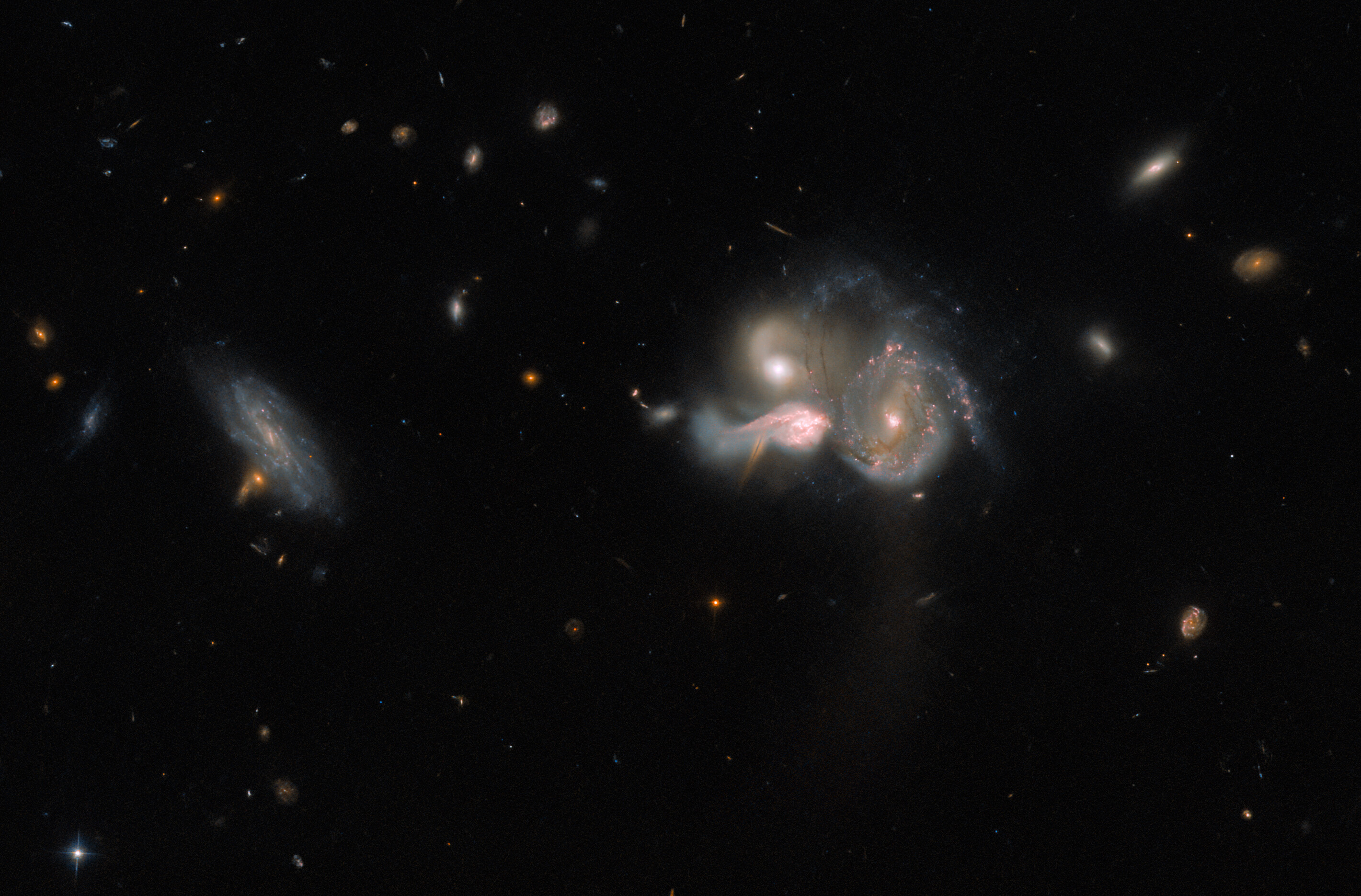
SDSSCGB 10389, a trio of galaxies merging into a single object

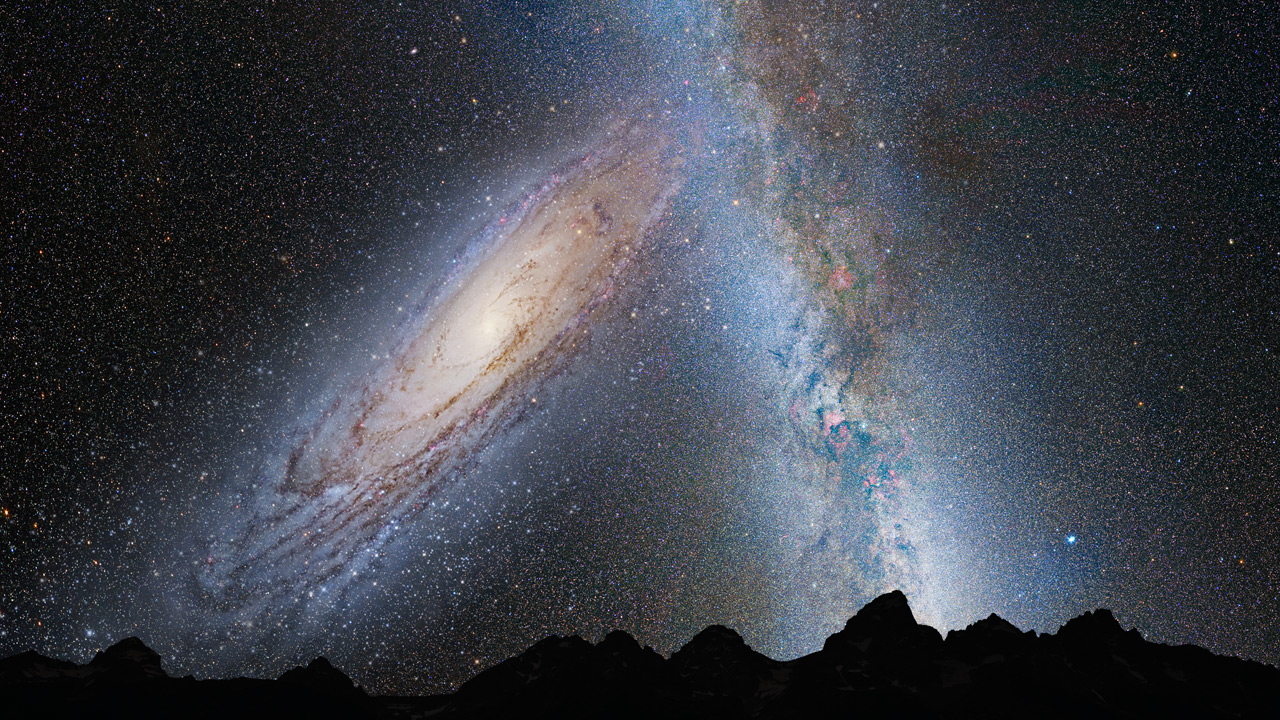
Example of computer simulation of Milky Way and Andromeda collision

Galaxy mergers can be simulated in computers, to learn more about galaxy formation. One famous example of this simulation is probably from the merging of our Milky Way and Andromeda. The computer simulations using the information given by Hubble indicate that two billion years following the collision, the interacting galaxies will finish entirely fusing under the influence of gravity and transform into one elliptical galaxy resembling the ones frequently found in the local universe. During the last decade, we made huge progress toward the technique we used for simulating galaxy merger in the help of deep learning, particularly the convolutional neural network so it can also be utilized to deduce information regarding the timescales of merger events and as well as each of the stages that occur within the process. A research team was able to perform simulations utilizing Gadget N-body/SPH simulations to predict the relevant timescales for galaxy mergers of Sbc-Sbc and G-G types, with the first pass occurring between 0.39-1.28 Gyr after the beginning of the merger, the maximum separation at between 0.68-1.91 Gyr, and the merger event being considered to have occurred at 1.17-3.76 Gyr, depending on the subtype of the merger. Similarly such use of simulations can be extended to post-merger events as well. Another research team leveraged another simulation framework to largely divide the post-merger events into four stages and their time periods, with the entire post-merger process spanning 1.76 Gyr.

Galaxy pairs initially of any morphological type can be followed, taking into account all gravitational forces, and also the hydrodynamics and dissipation of the interstellar gas, the star formation out of the gas, and the energy and mass released back in the interstellar medium by supernovae. Such a library of galaxy merger simulations can be found on the GALMER website. A study led by Jennifer Lotz of the Space Telescope Science Institute in Baltimore, Maryland created computer simulations in order to better understand images taken by the Hubble Space Telescope. Lotz's team tried to account for a broad range of merger possibilities, from a pair of galaxies with equal masses joining to an interaction between a giant galaxy and a tiny one. The team also analyzed different orbits for the galaxies, possible collision impacts, and how galaxies were oriented to each other. In all, the group came up with 57 different merger scenarios and studied the mergers from 10 different viewing angles.

One of the largest galaxy mergers ever observed consisted of four elliptical galaxies in the cluster CL0958+4702. It may form one of the largest galaxies in the Universe.

Observationally, it can be hard to determine whether pairs of galaxies are merging, have merged, or will merge in the future. In fact, it can sometimes be hard to determine whether two galaxies are even interacting with each other, as some mergers may have no conspicuous features. Additionally, since it is impossible to observe the merger rate (i.e the number of mergers a galaxy will undergo in some time period), close pair fractions (i.e the fraction of galaxies that are close to each other in a sample, regardless of whether they are merging or not) are often used as a proxy.

== Categories ==
Galaxy mergers can be classified into distinct groups due to the properties of the merging galaxies, such as their number, their comparative size and their gas richness. The merger fraction, the fraction of galaxies merging in a given sample, is dependent on redshift; according to one paper with a sample of 33,320 galaxies at low redshift (z < 2), the merger fraction was about 38%.

=== By number ===
Mergers can be categorized by the number of galaxies engaged in the process:

Binary merger
Two interacting galaxies merge.
Multiple merger
Three or more galaxies merge. This is quite rare; one study puts the fraction of galaxies undergoing a multiple merger as one to two orders of magnitude lower than galaxies undergoing binary mergers.

=== By size ===
Mergers can be categorized by the extent to which the largest involved galaxy is changed in size or form by the merger:

Minor merger
A merger is minor if one of the galaxies is significantly larger than the other(s). The larger galaxy will often "eat" the smaller - a phenomenon aptly named “galactic cannibalism” - absorbing most of its gas and stars with little other significant effect on the larger galaxy. Our home galaxy, the Milky Way, is thought to be currently absorbing several smaller galaxies in this fashion, such as the Canis Major Dwarf Galaxy, and possibly the Magellanic Clouds. In 2025, researchers published a paper indicating that the Large Magellanic Cloud would merge with the Milky Way within the next 2 billion years. The Virgo Stellar Stream is thought to be the remains of a dwarf galaxy that has been mostly merged with the Milky Way.
Major merger
A merger of two spiral galaxies that are approximately the same size is major; if they collide at appropriate angles and speeds, they will likely merge in a fashion that drives away much of the dust and gas through a variety of feedback mechanisms that often include a stage in which there are active galactic nuclei. This is thought to be the driving force behind many quasars. The result is an elliptical galaxy, and many astronomers hypothesize that this is the primary mechanism that creates ellipticals.

One study found that large galaxies merged with each other on average once over the past 9 billion years. Small galaxies coalesced with large galaxies more frequently. Note that the Milky Way and the Andromeda Galaxy are predicted to have a 50% chance of colliding in about 4.5 billion years. The expected result of these galaxies merging would be major as they have similar sizes, and will change from two "grand design" spiral galaxies to (probably) a giant elliptical galaxy.

=== By gas richness ===
Mergers can be categorized by the degree to which the gas (if any) carried within and around the merging galaxies interacts:

Wet merger
A wet merger is between gas-rich galaxies ("blue" galaxies). Wet mergers typically produce a large amount of star formation, transform disc galaxies into elliptical galaxies, and trigger quasar activity.
Dry merger
A merger between gas-poor galaxies ("red" galaxies) is called dry. Dry mergers typically do not greatly change the galaxies' star formation rates, but can play an important role in increasing stellar mass.
Damp merger
A damp merger occurs between the same two galaxy-types mentioned above ("blue" and "red" galaxies), if there is enough gas to fuel significant star formation but not enough to form globular clusters.
Mixed merger
A mixed merger occurs when gas-rich and gas-poor galaxies ("blue" and "red" galaxies) merge.

== Merger history trees ==
In the standard cosmological model, any single galaxy is expected to have formed from a few or many successive mergers of dark matter haloes, in which gas cools and forms stars at the centres of the haloes, becoming the optically visible objects historically identified as galaxies during the twentieth century. Modelling the mathematical graph of the mergers of these dark matter haloes, and in turn, the corresponding star formation, was initially treated either by analysing purely gravitational N-body simulations or by using numerical realisations of statistical ("semi-analytical") formulae.

In a 1992 observational cosmology conference in Milan, Roukema, Quinn and Peterson showed the first merger history trees of dark matter haloes extracted from cosmological N-body simulations. These merger history trees were combined with formulae for star formation rates and evolutionary population synthesis, yielding synthetic luminosity functions of galaxies (statistics of how many galaxies are intrinsically bright or faint) at different cosmological epochs. Given the complex dynamics of dark matter halo mergers, a fundamental problem in modelling merger history tree is to define when a halo at one time step is a descendant of a halo at the previous time step. Roukema's group chose to define this relation by requiring the halo at the later time step to contain strictly more than 50 percent of the particles in the halo at the earlier time step; this guaranteed that between two time steps, any halo could have at most a single descendant. This galaxy formation modelling method yields rapidly calculated models of galaxy populations with synthetic spectra and corresponding statistical properties comparable with observations.

Independently, Lacey and Cole showed at the same 1992 conference how they used the Press–Schechter formalism combined with dynamical friction to statistically generate Monte Carlo realisations of dark matter halo merger history trees and the corresponding formation of the stellar cores (galaxies) of the haloes. Kauffmann, White and Guiderdoni extended this approach in 1993 to include semi-analytical formulae for gas cooling, star formation, gas reheating from supernovae, and for the hypothesised conversion of disc galaxies into elliptical galaxies. Both the Kauffmann group and Okamoto and Nagashima later took up the N-body simulation derived merger history tree approach.

== Examples ==
Some of the galaxies that are in the process of merging or are believed to have formed by merging are:

- Antennae Galaxies
- Mice Galaxies
- Centaurus A
- NGC 7318
- Arp 273

== Gallery ==
Merging galaxies

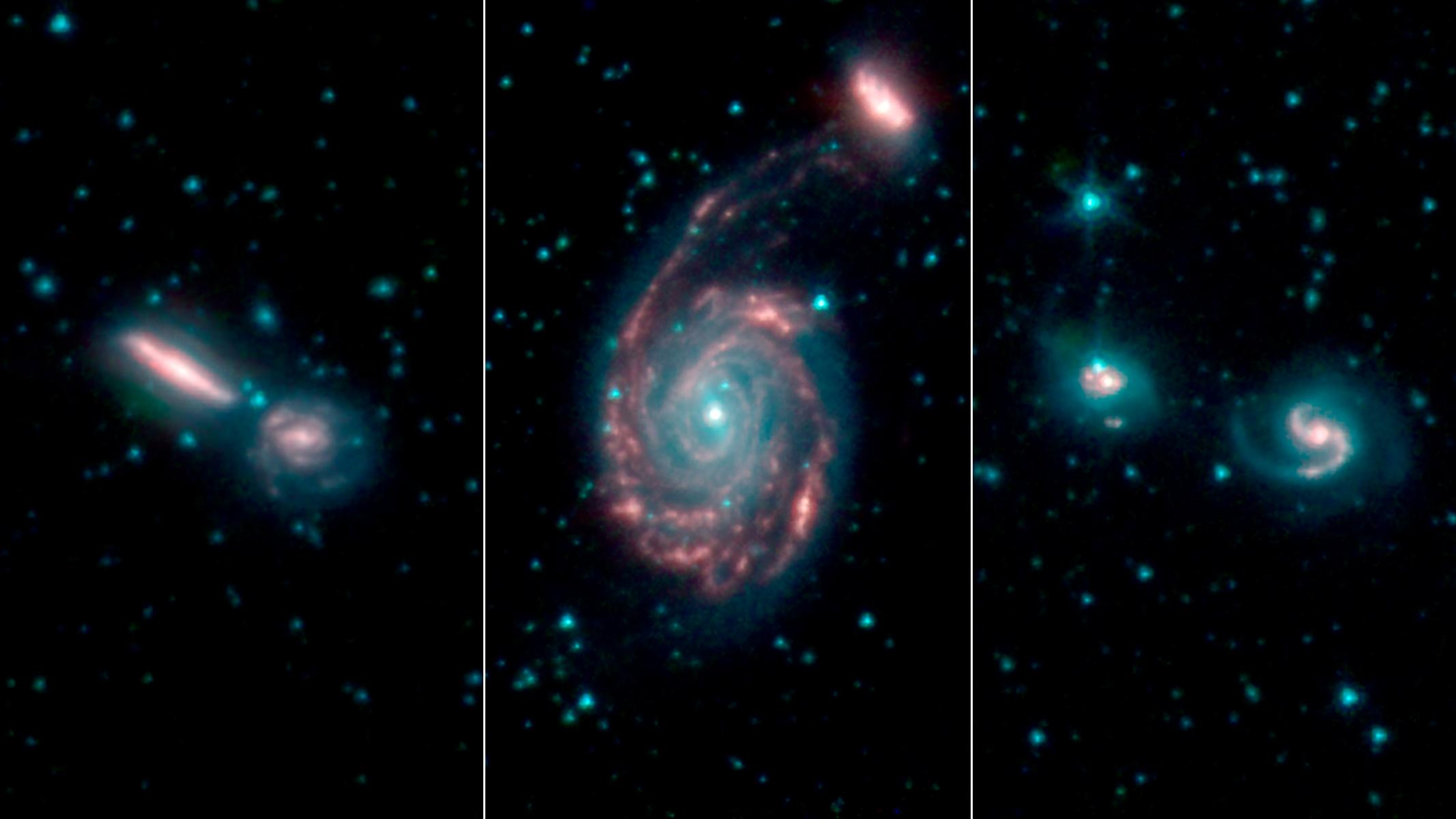
Arp 302 (left); NGC 7752/7753 (middle); IIZw96 (right)

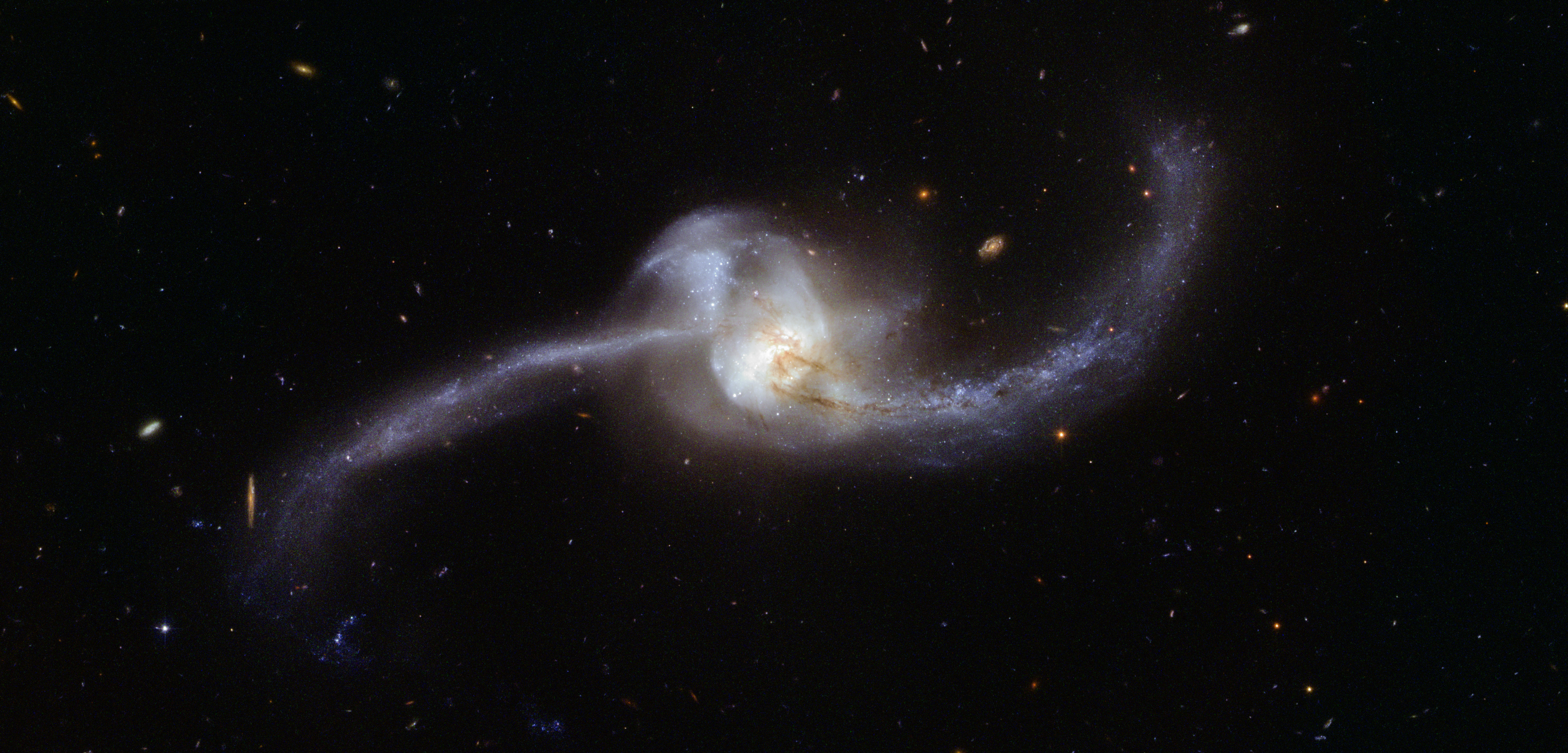
NGC 2623 – late stage merging of two galaxies

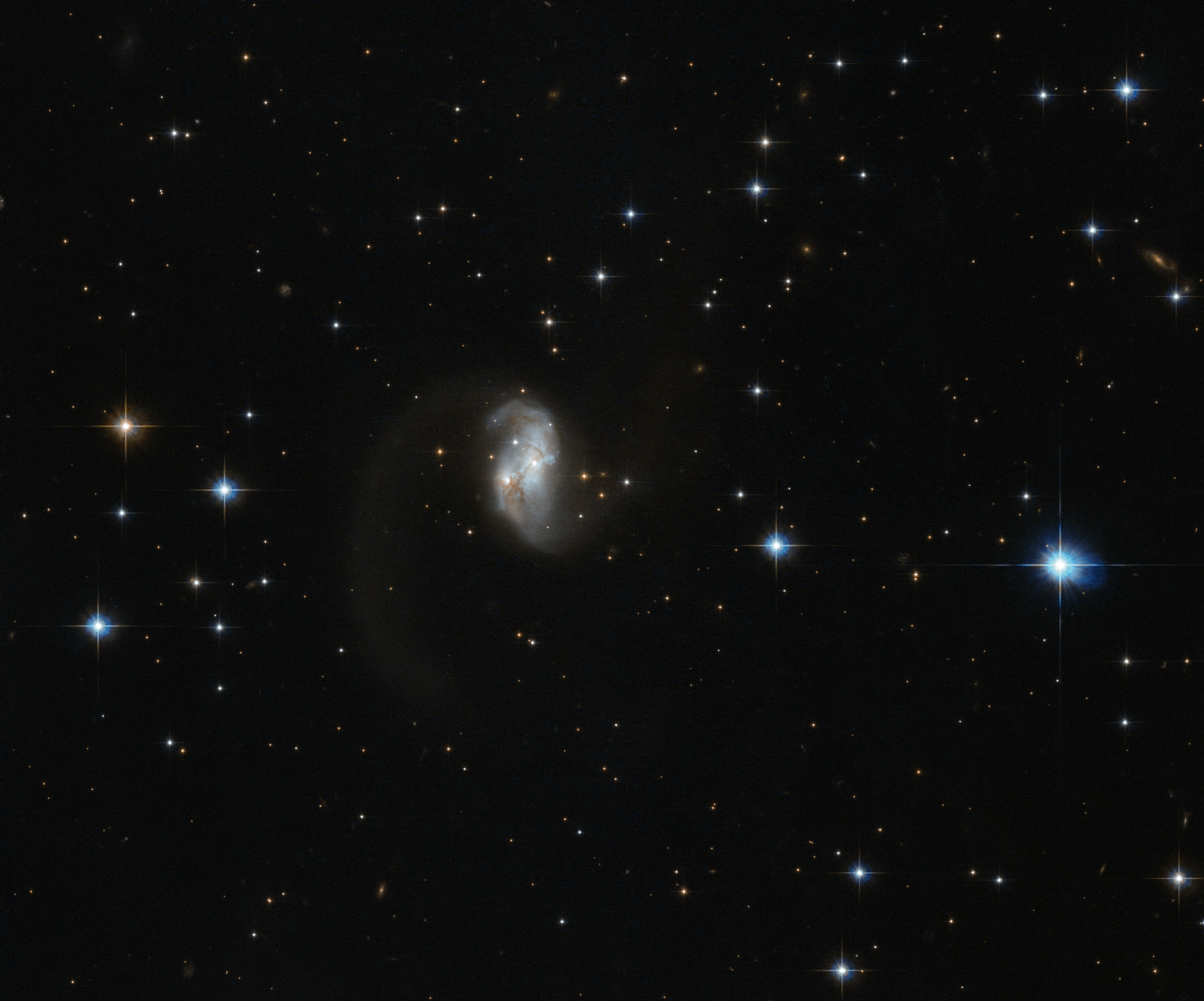
Galaxy twistings – possible merger

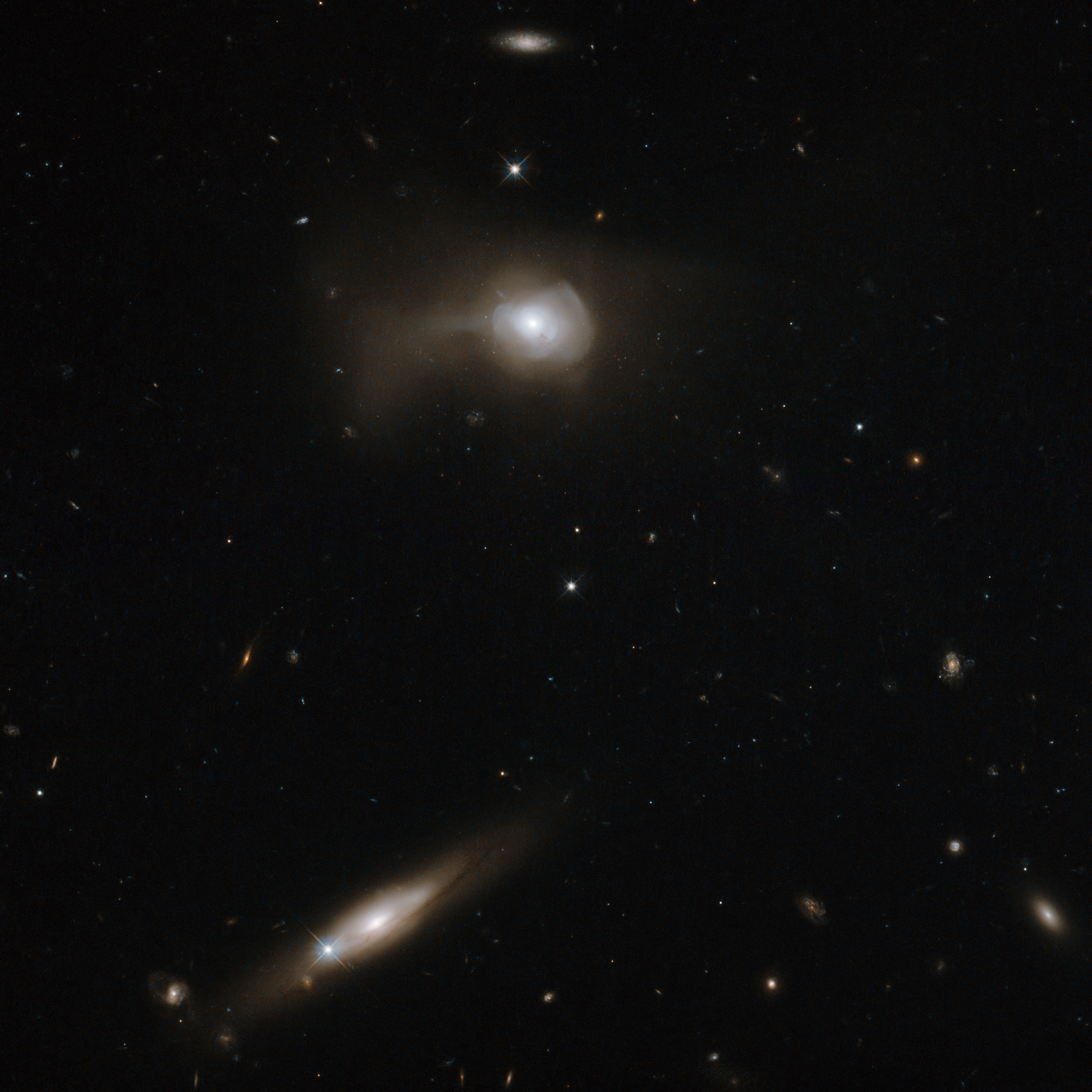
Markarian 779 – possible merger

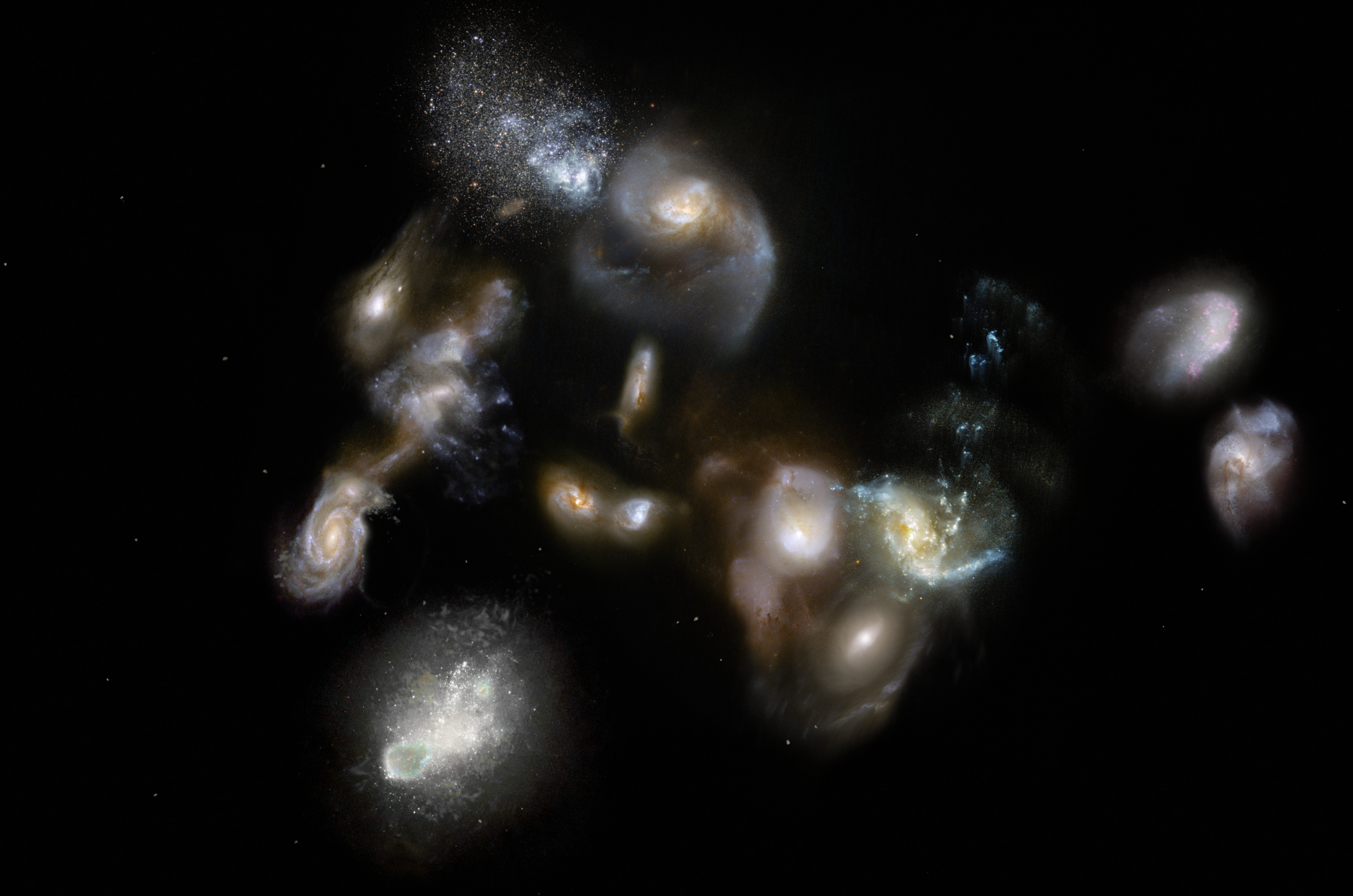
Ancient galaxy mega-merger (artist concept)

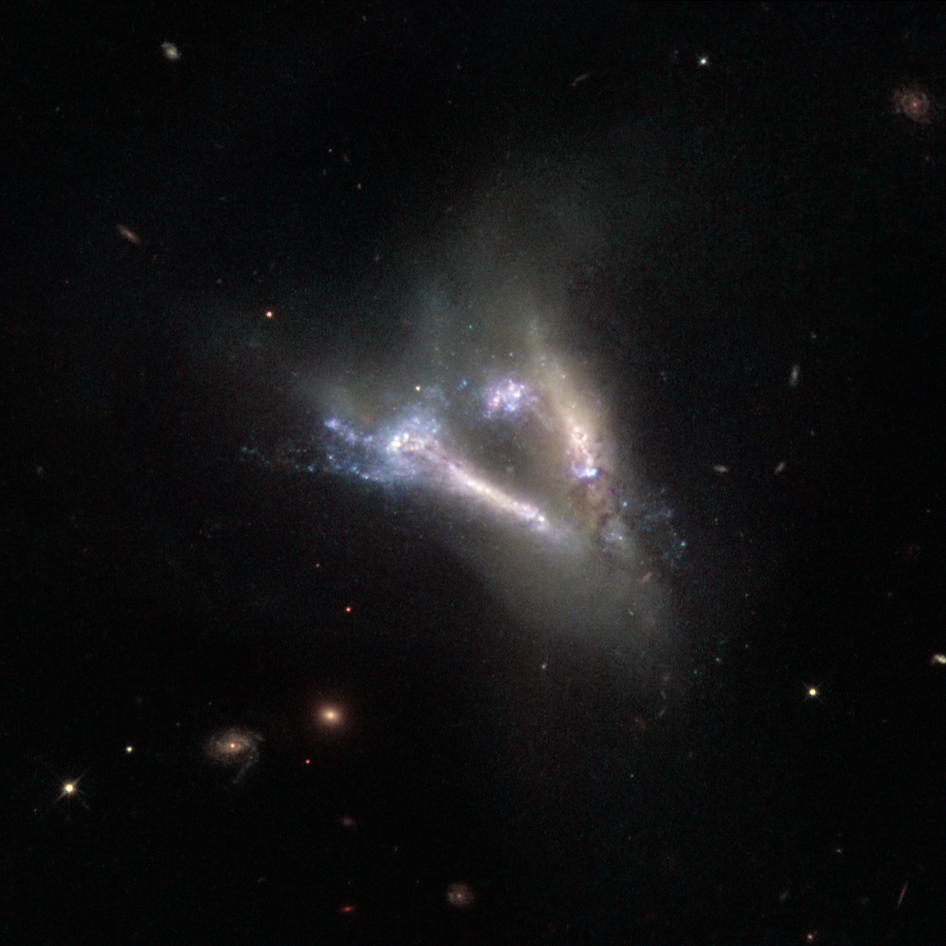
“Flying V” – two galaxies

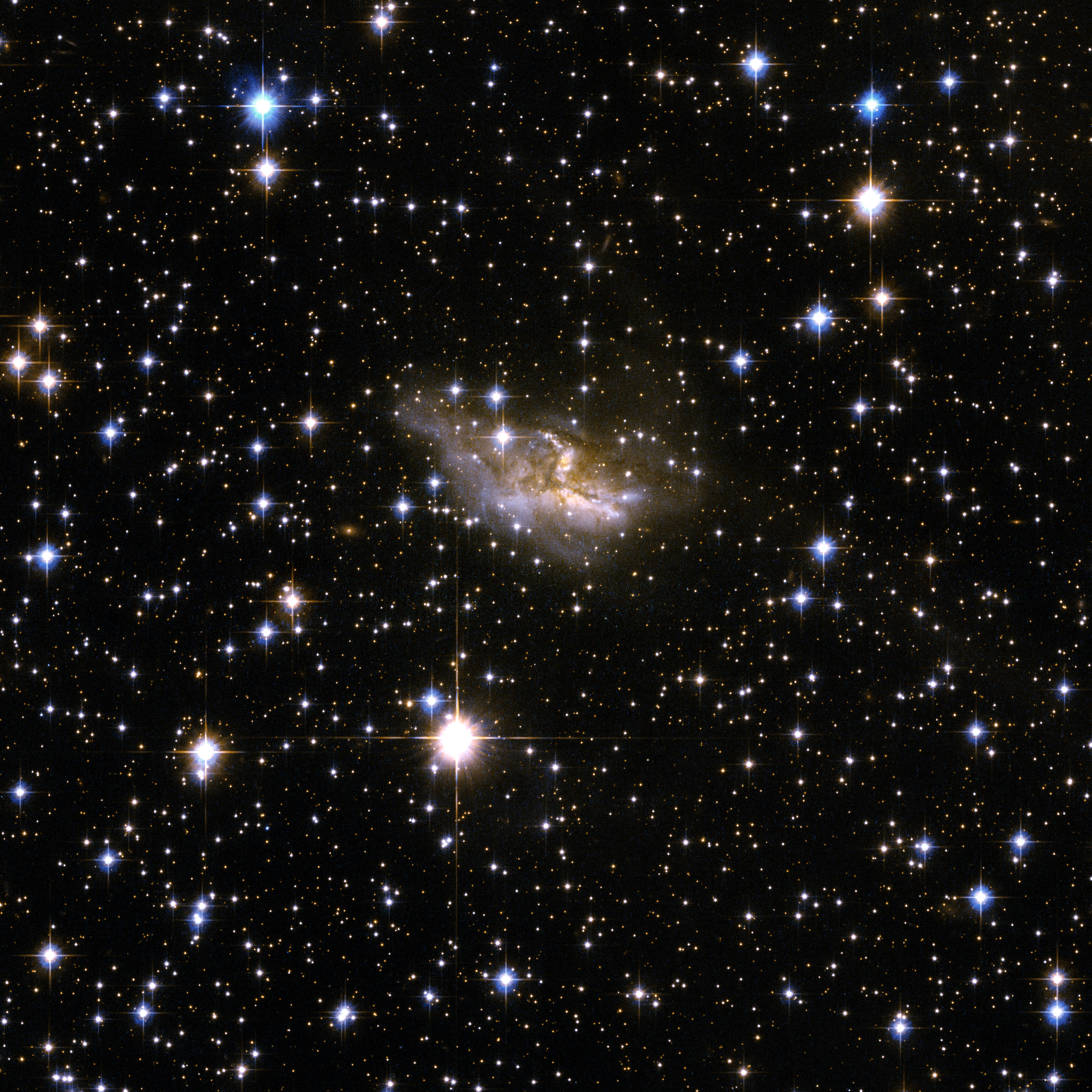
ESO 99-4, peculiar galaxy – possible merger

== See also ==
- Bulge (astronomy)
- List of stellar streams
- Mass deficit
- Pea galaxy
