= Mice Galaxies =

Galaxies in the constellation of Coma Berenices

NGC 4676A / 4676B
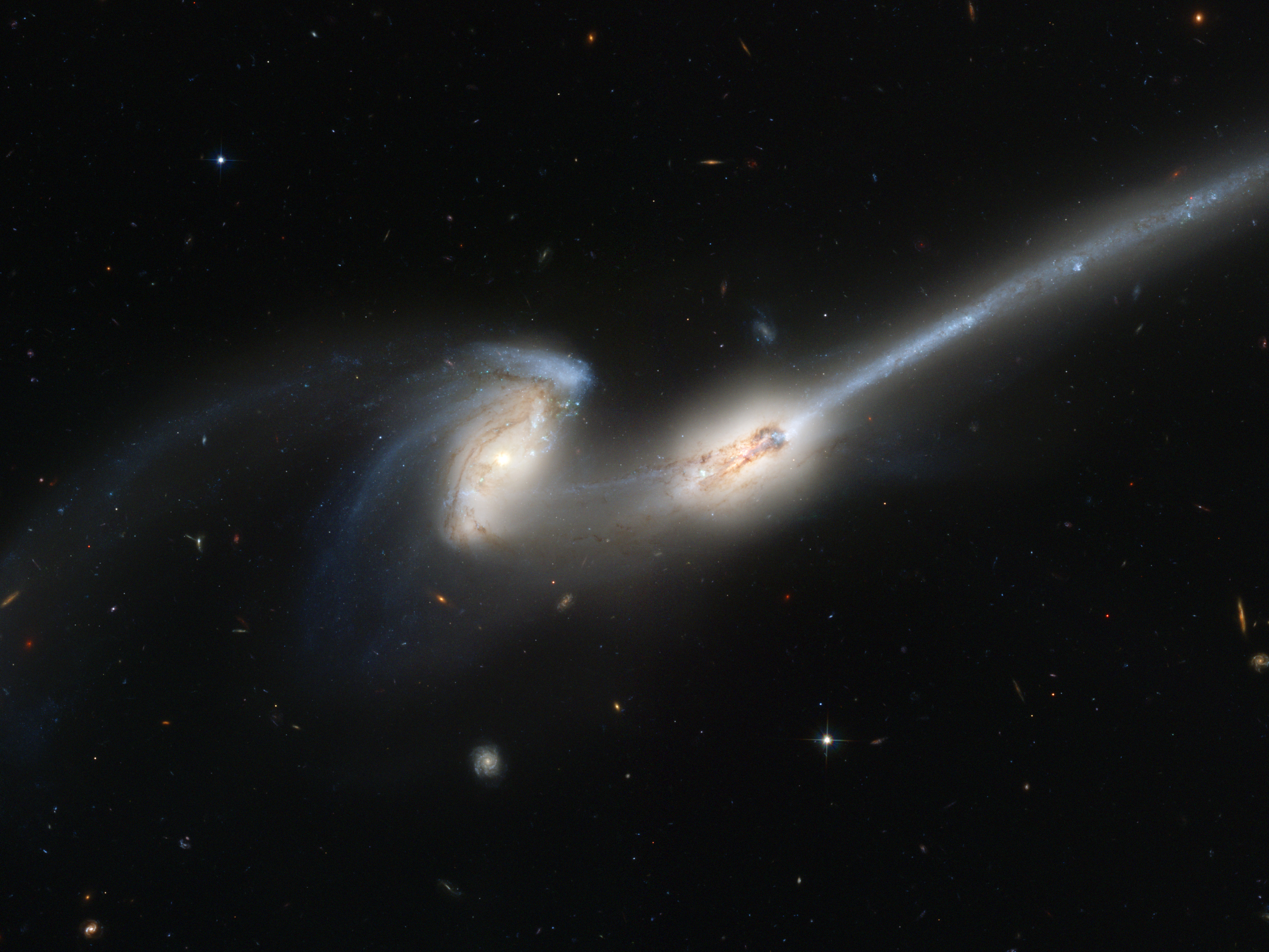
- The Mice Galaxies, NGC 4676A (right) / NGC 4676B (left)

Observation data (J2000 epoch)
- Constellation: Coma Berenices
- Right ascension: 12^{h} 46^{m} 10.08^{s}
- Declination: +30° 43′ 52.3″
- Redshift: 0.022049
- Heliocentric radial velocity: 6,610 km/s
- Galactocentric velocity: 6,626±1 km/s
- Distance: 345.1 ± 24.14 Mly (105.8 ± 7.4 Mpc)h^{−1}_{0.6774} (Comoving); 326 Mly (99.95 Mpc)h^{−1}_{0.6774} (Light-travel)
- Group or cluster: Coma Cluster
- Apparent magnitude (V): 14.1

Characteristics
- Type: Mult
- Size: 352,120 ly × 190,150 ly (107.96 kpc × 58.30 kpc) (diameter; "total" magnitude) (Note: The quoted diameter in this infobox was based on NED's provided scale "Virgo + GA + Shapley" of 513 parsec/arcsec multiplied with given angular diameters.)
- Notable features: Interacting galaxies

Other designations
- Mice Galaxies, IC 819 / 820, UGC 7938 / 7939, PGC 43062 / 43065, Arp 242

NGC 4676, or the Mice Galaxies, are two spiral galaxies in the constellation Coma Berenices. About 105.8 megaparsecs (345 million light-years) distant, they have begun the process of colliding and merging. Their "mice" name refers to the long tails produced by tidal action—the relative difference between gravitational pulls on the near and far parts of each galaxy—known here as a galactic tide. It is a possibility that both galaxies, which are members of the Coma Cluster, have experienced a collision, and will continue colliding until they coalesce.

The colors of the galaxies are peculiar. In NGC 4676A a core with some dark markings is surrounded by a bluish white remnant of spiral arms. The tail is unusual, starting out blue and terminating in a more yellowish color, despite the fact that the beginning of each arm in virtually every spiral galaxy starts yellow and terminates in a bluish color. NGC 4676B has a yellowish core and two arcs; arm remnants underneath are bluish as well.

The galaxies were photographed in 2002 by the Hubble Space Telescope. In the background of the Mice Galaxies, there are over 3000 galaxies, at distances up to 13 billion light-years.

== See also ==
- Antennae Galaxies
- NGC 7318
- List of galaxies

== Further readings ==
- Chien, Li-Hsin; Barnes, Joshua E.; Kewley, Lisa J.; Chambers, Kenneth, C. (May 2007). "Multiobject Spectroscopy of Young Star Clusters in NGC 4676". The Astrophysical Journal. 660 (2): L105–L108. arXiv:astro-ph/0703510. Bibcode:2007ApJ...660L.105C. doi:10.1086/518215. S2CID 119417388.
