= Bird (disambiguation) =

A bird is a feathered, winged, bipedal, warm-blooded, egg-laying, vertebrate.

Bird, BIRD, or the bird may also refer to:

== Armed forces ==
- The Bird, mascot of the U.S. Air Force Falcons

== Arts and entertainment ==
=== Fictional characters ===
- Tracy "Bird" Van Adams, in the Soul Food film and TV series
- Bird, of the Barksdale Organization in TV series The Wire
- Bird, in the TV series WordWorld
- Bird (The Dumping Ground character)
- Bird, in the TV series Bob the Builder

=== Film and television episodes ===
- Bird (1988 film), a film about Charlie "Bird" Parker
- Bird (2017 film), a Russian comedy-drama film
- Bird (2024 film), a drama film directed by Andrea Arnold
- The Birds (film), a 1963 horror-thriller film by Alfred Hitchcock
- "The Bird" (Steptoe and Son), a 1962 television episode

=== Music ===
==== Artists ====
- Charlie “Bird” Parker (1920–1955), a jazz saxophonist
- Bird (band)
- Bird (singer) (Yuki Kitayama, born 1975), a Japanese singer
- Bird Thongchai McIntyre (born 1958), Thai singer
- Bird (Yuan Zhang, born 1985), of Top Combine

==== Albums ====
- Bird (Lisbeth Scott album), 2015
- Bird (single album), by Namjoo, 2020
- Bird: The Complete Charlie Parker on Verve, a 1990 box set by Charlie Parker
- Bird, a 1988 album by B.A.L.L.
- Bird, an album by Gary Jules
- Bird, a 1996 album by Nilon Bombers

==== Songs ====
- "The Bird" (Jerry Reed song), 1982
- "The Bird" (The Time song), 1984
- "Bird", a song by Exo, 2019
- ”Bird”, a song by Bazzi from the 2022 album Infinite Dream
- "Bird", a song by Ha Sung-woon from the 2019 EP My Moment
- "Bird", a 2007 song by Mikuni Shimokawa
- "Bird", a song by Tristania from the 2005 album Ashes
- "The Bird", a composition by Charlie Parker, 1947
- "The Bird", a song by George Jones from the 1987 album Too Wild Too Long

=== Other arts and entertainment ===
- The Bird: The Life and Legacy of Mark Fidrych, a 2013 book by Doug Wilson
- Bird Opening, a chess opening
- Bird (mathematical artwork), bird-like mathematical artworks that are introduced by mathematical equations
- Bird (Botero), a sculpture by Fernando Botero

== Businesses and organisations ==
- Bird Global, an American scooter share company
- Bird College, a performing arts college in London, England
- BIRD Foundation, an Israel–U.S. R&D organisation
- Bird Machine Company, an American company from the 1900s
- Bangalore Initiative for Religious Dialogue, an Indian interfaith organization
- Ningbo Bird, a Chinese manufacturer of mobile phones
- Bird Technologies, an electronic manufacturing company for radio frequency communication
- Bird's, a brand name owned by Premier Foods

== Media ==
- News Bird, the former name of Japanese television news channel TBS News (channel)

== People ==
- Bird (surname)
- Bird (given name)
- Bird (nickname)
- Bird baronets, a title in the Baronetage of the United Kingdom

== Places ==
- Cape Bird, Ross Island, Antarctica
- Mount Bird, Ross Island, Antarctica, a volcano
- Bird, Manitoba, Fox Lake Cree Nation's primary reserve, Canada
  - Bird railway station
- Bird, a neighborhood of Anchorage, Alaska, U.S.
- Bird Key, an island (key) in Sarasota Bay, Florida, U.S.
- Bird Key (Miami), Florida, U.S.
- Bird Road, State Road 976 in Florida, U.S.

== Science and technology ==
- BIRD (satellite), an Indian Earth observation satellite
- Bird (technology), an interactive input device
- Bird Internet routing daemon
- ESO 593-8, a group of interacting galaxies also known as "The Bird"

== Transportation and ships ==
- Bird-class minesweeper, of the Royal New Zealand Navy
- Lapwing-class minesweeper, often called the Bird class, of the U.S. Navy
- Bird-class patrol vessel, of the Royal Navy
- Bird class, GWR 3300 Class steam locomotives
- Robertson B1-RD, an ultralight aircraft

== Other uses ==
- the bird, an obscene hand gesture

== See also ==
- Big Bird (disambiguation)
- Birdo, a character in Nintendo's Mario franchise
- Birds (disambiguation), including Bird's
- Birdy (disambiguation)
- Byrd (disambiguation)
- Birdsong (disambiguation)
- Birt (disambiguation)
- Bert (disambiguation)
