= NGC 6240 =

Galaxy merger remnant in the constellation Ophiuchus

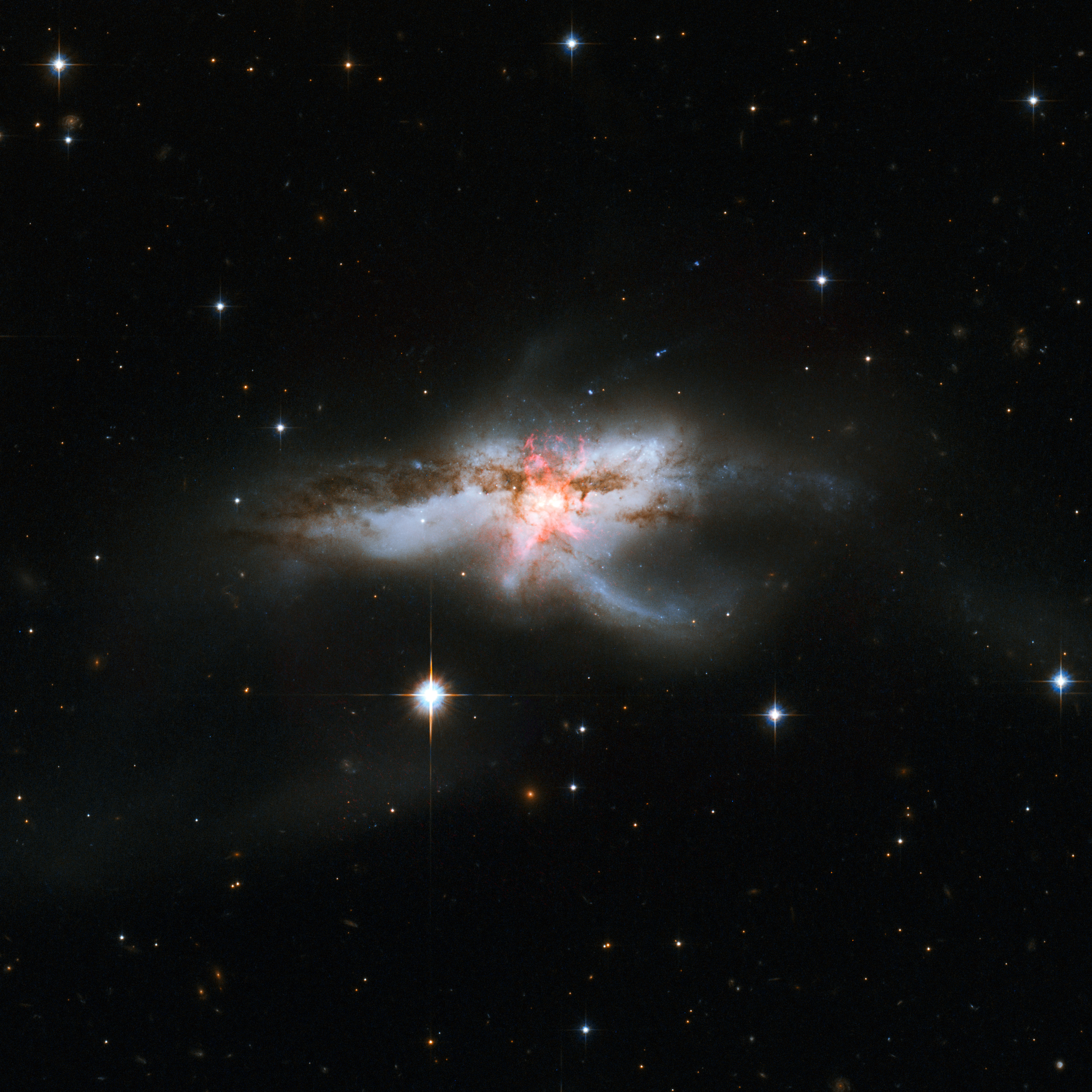
- NGC 6240 imaged by the Hubble Space Telescope. At the centre there are two supermassive black holes spiraling closer and closer to one another.

Observation data (J2000 epoch)
- Constellation: Ophiuchus
- Right ascension: 16^{h} 52^{m} 58.8708^{s}
- Declination: +02° 24′ 03.333″
- Redshift: 7287 ± 8 km/s
- Distance: 351.9 ± 24.7 Mly (107.90 ± 7.56 Mpc)
- Apparent magnitude (V): 12.8

Characteristics
- Type: I0 pec
- Size: ~242,900 ly (74.48 kpc) (estimated)
- Apparent size (V): 2.1′ × 1.1′
- Notable features: merger remnant

Other designations
- IRAS 16504+0228, IC 4625, UGC 10592, MCG +00-43-004, PGC 59186, CGCG 025-011, VV 617

NGC 6240, also known as the Starfish Galaxy, is a nearby ultraluminous infrared galaxy (ULIRG) in the constellation Ophiuchus. It was discovered by French astronomer Édouard Stephan on 12 July 1871.

The galaxy is the remnant of a merger between three smaller galaxies. The collision between the three progenitor galaxies has resulted in a single, larger galaxy with three distinct nuclei and a highly disturbed structure, including faint extensions and loops.

== Double nuclei ==
=== Star formation versus supermassive black holes ===
The power sources of ULIRGs in general has been greatly debated. Infrared light from galaxies generally originates from dust in the interstellar medium. ULIRGs are abnormally bright in the infrared. The infrared dust emission in ULIRGs is over one trillion times more luminous than the Sun (i.e. it has an infrared luminosity of 10^{12} L_{☉}). Astronomers have speculated that either intense star formation regions or active galactic nuclei (which contain supermassive black holes) may be responsible for the intense dust heating that produces this emission, although the general consensus is that both may be present in most ULIRGs. Studying the exact nature of ULIRGs has been difficult, however, because the dust in the centers of these galaxies obscures both visible and near-infrared starlight and because theoretical models of both starbursts and active galactic nuclei have demonstrated that they may look similar. Because NGC 6240 is a nearby example of such a ULIRG, astronomers have studied it intensively to understand its power source.

=== X-ray observations ===
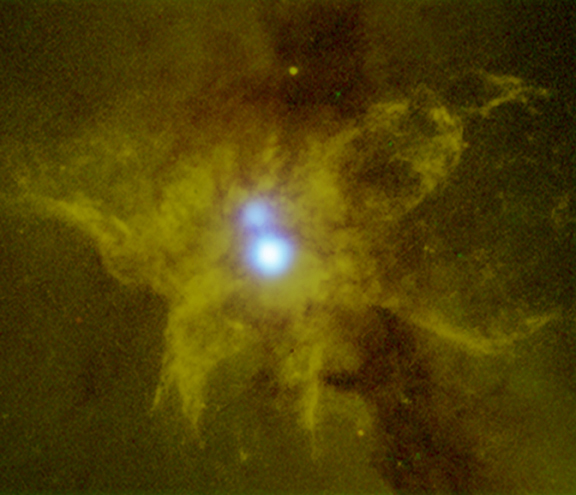
X-ray image of NGC 6240 taken with the Chandra X-Ray Observatory, superimposed on an optical image of the galaxy. The X-ray emission from the two active galactic nuclei can be seen as bright blue point sources. Credit: NASA

Observations performed by Stefanie Komossa and collaborators with the Chandra X-Ray Observatory have detected strong hard X-ray emission from two of the nuclei. The intensity of this emission and the presence of emission from lowly ionized or neutral iron indicate that both of these nuclei are active galactic nuclei. Presumably, these are the black holes that were originally at the centers of the merging galaxies. Over the course of millions of years, the black holes are expected to come closer together and form a binary supermassive black hole.

Recent studies by Wolfram Kollatschny and collaborators using the MUSE instrument on board the VLT have revealed that there are in fact three, not two, supermassive black holes at the core of this remnant. Their masses are suggested to be 90 million, 710 million, and 360 million solar masses. Two of the three black holes are active. The additional SMBH implies that three original galaxies are merging instead of two.

== Supernovae ==
Four supernovae have been observed in NGC 6240:

- SN 2000bg (Type IIn, mag. 17.4) was discovered by the Lick Observatory Supernova Search (LOSS) on 1 April 2000.
- SN 2010gp (Type Ia, mag. 17.5) was discovered by The CHilean Automatic Supernova sEarch (CHASE) on 14 July 2010.
- SN 2013dc (Type II-P, mag. 18.7) was discovered by Adam Block on 11 April 2013.
- PSN J16525760+0223367 (Type Ia, mag. 15.8) was discovered by Robert Gagliano, Jack Newton, and Tim Puckett on 23 April 2014.

== Final stages ==
A galaxy merger is a slow process lasting more than a billion years as two galaxies, under the inexorable pull of gravity, dance toward each other before finally joining together. After research done over the past few years, scientists have concluded that this galaxy has reached its last stages before colliding into one another. Photographic evidence proves that the two nuclei have been growing closer, and in that process, they have been emitting more gasses and stellar winds outward. Those winds evict about 100 solar masses in gases from the galaxy every year. This type of winds and growth of the black holes are known to occur during the last 10 to 20 million years of the merger; it is assumed that this is the amount of time left for the galaxy to finish its collision phase. After this phase, the merged galaxies will become one, becoming a post-merger object until if and when any tidal tails and plumes evaporate.

== Gallery ==
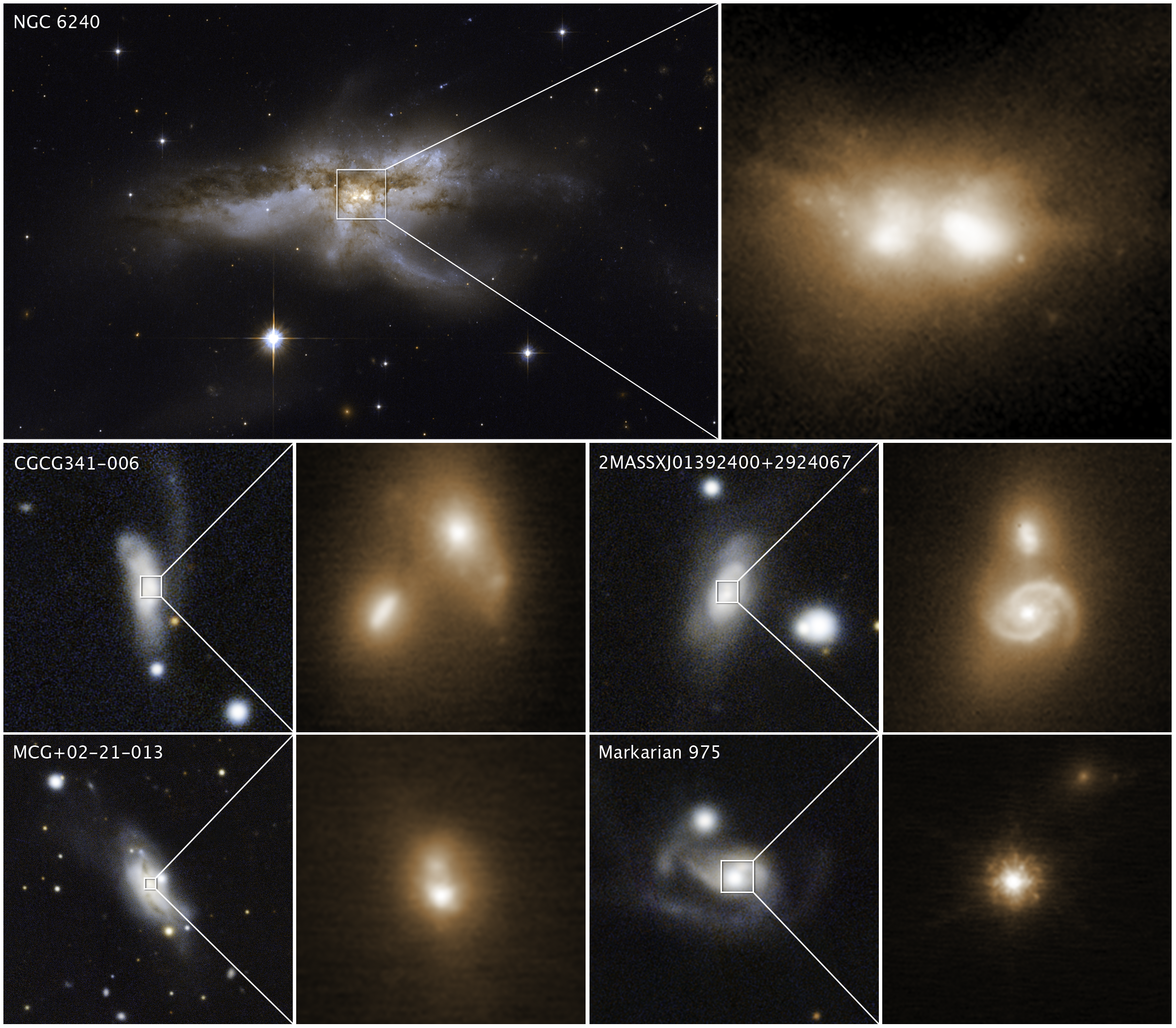
Hubble and Keck observatories uncover black holes coalescing.

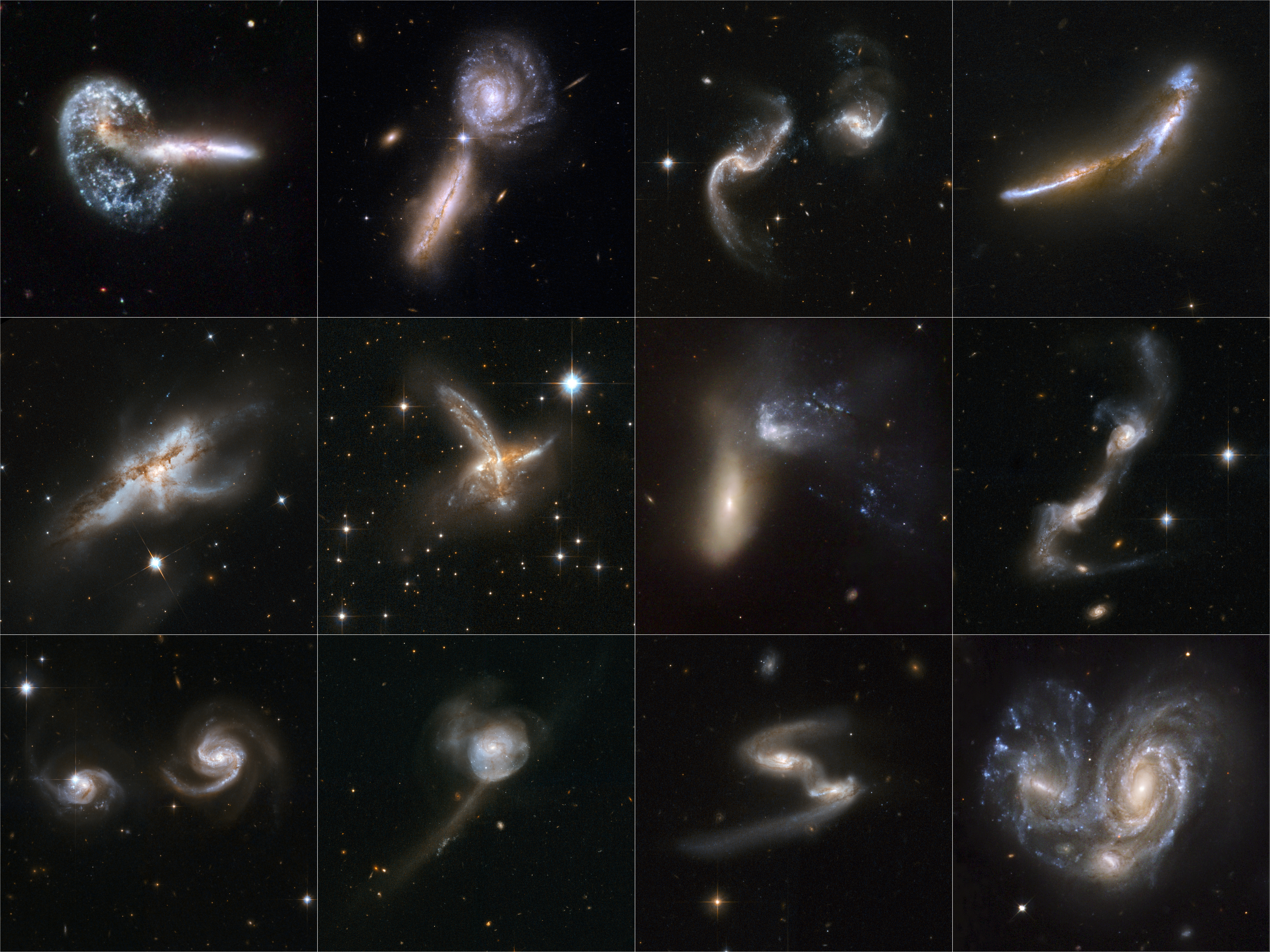
Arp 148, VV 340, Arp 256, NGC 6670, NGC 6240, ESO 593-8, NGC 454, UGC 8335, NGC 6786, NGC 17, ESO 77-14, Arp 272

NGC 6240 imaged by the Cerro Tololo Inter-American Observatory

== See also ==
- Arp 220 – another ultraluminous infrared galaxy and merger remnant
- Antennae Galaxies – a nearby pair of merging galaxies
- NGC 520 – another merger remnant
- Markarian 273 – an ultraluminous infrared galaxy with two active nuclei
- UGC 5101 – another ultraluminous infrared galaxy with active nucleus
