= Birds (disambiguation) =

Birds are feathered, winged, bipedal, warm-blooded, egg-laying animals.

Birds may also refer to:

== Literature ==
- The Birds (play), an ancient Greek play by Aristophanes
- The Birds (novel), a novel by Tarjei Vesaas
- "The Birds" (story), a 1952 story by Daphne du Maurier
- Birds, the magazine of the Royal Society for the Protection of Birds
- The Birds, a musical play by David Cerda and Pauline Pang

== Film and television ==
- The Birds (film), a 1963 Alfred Hitchcock film
- Birds (advertisement), a 2008 award-winning television commercial
- "Birds" (Life), 2009 episode of the BBC documentary series
- "Birds", a Series B episode of the television QI (2004)

== Music ==
- The Birds (band), a 1960s UK rhythm and blues band
- The Birds (Respighi) or Gli Uccelli, a suite for small orchestra by Ottorino Respighi

=== Albums ===
- Birds (Bic Runga album) (2005)
- Birds (North Sea Radio Orchestra album) (2008)
- Birds (Marius Neset album) (2013 album)

=== Songs ===
- "Birds" (Kate Nash song) (2007)
- "Birds" (Anouk song) (2013)
- "Birds" (Coldplay song) (2015)
- "Birds" (Imagine Dragons song) (2019)
- "Birds", a song by Deas Vail from Birds and Cages
- "Birds", a 2013 song by Death Grips from Government Plates
- "Birds", a song by Emiliana Torini from Me and Armini
- "Birds", a song by Guided by Voices from English Little League
- "Birds", a song by M83 from Dead Cities, Red Seas & Lost Ghosts
- "Birds", a song by Menahan Street Band from Make the Road by Walking
- "Birds", a song by Neil Young from After the Gold Rush, later covered by Linda Ronstadt
- "Birds", a song by Quasi from Featuring "Birds"
- "Birds", a song by Turnstile from Never Enough
- "The Birds", a 2011 song by Elbow from Build a Rocket Boys!
- "The Birds Pt. 1" and "The Birds Pt. 2", two songs by The Weeknd from Thursday

== Places ==
=== United States ===
- Birds, Illinois, an unincorporated community
- Birds, Texas, a ghost town in Tarrant County, Texas

== Sport ==
- Philadelphia Eagles or Birds, a National Football League team
- Baltimore Orioles or Birds, a Major League Baseball team

== Other uses ==
- The Birds (collection), a 1995 collection by British designer Alexander McQueen
- Birds (MDPI journal), established in 2020
- Birds (Royal Society for the Protection of Birds journal), established in 1966
- The Birds (sculpture)
- BIRDS Project, a multinational satellite program that started with Birds-1
- Bird's, a brand name owned by Premier Foods
- The Birds (painting), a painting by Georges Braque

== See also ==
- Bird (disambiguation)
- Birdz (disambiguation)
- Byrd (disambiguation)
- Birds of Tokyo (disambiguation)
- Bird's Opening, a chess opening
- The Byrds, an American band from the 1960s
- Die Vögel (opera) (The Birds), by Walter Braunfels
- Gli Uccelli (The Birds), a suite for small orchestra by Ottorino Respighi
