= Byrd =

Byrd commonly refers to:

- William Byrd (c. 1540 – 1623), an English composer of the Renaissance
- Richard E. Byrd (1888–1957), an American naval officer and explorer

Byrd or Byrds may also refer to:

== Other people ==
- Byrd (surname), including a list of people with the name
- Byrd Baylor (1924–2021), American children's writer
- Byrd Billings (died 2009), American murder victim
- Byrd Brown (1929–2001), American lawyer and Civil Rights activist
- Byrd D. Crudup (1897–1960), American football and basketball coach
- Byrd Spilman Dewey (1856–1942), American author and land investor
- Byrd Dickens (born 1971), Canadian former actor
- Byrd Douglas (1894–1965), American college baseball and football coach and judge
- Byrd Ficklin (born 2006), American football player
- Byrd Gibbens (1936–2023), American historian and professor
- Byrd Hill (1800–1872), American slave trader
- Byrd Leavell, American literary agent
- Byrd Lockhart (1782–1839), American surveyor, Alamo defender, courier, and Texian officer
- Byrd Lynn (1889–1940), American baseball player
- Byrd Mock (1876–1966), American writer, journalist, poet, publisher, and golfer
- Byrd Prillerman (1859–1929), American educator and school administrator
- Byrd Whigham (1933–2017), American minor league baseball player and college football coach
- Byrd White, American accountant and West Virginia government official

== Places ==
- Byrd, Alabama, United States
- Marie Byrd Land, Antarctica
  - Mount Byrd
  - Byrd Station, a former U.S. research station
- Byrd (lunar crater), on the Moon
- Byrd (Martian crater), on Mars

== Other uses ==
- The Byrds, an American rock band
- Byrd Amendment, the Continued Dumping and Subsidy Offset Act of 2000, an American legislative act
- Byrd Amendment (1971), to the U.S. Federal Strategic and Critical Materials Stock Piling Act
- Byrd Brand, knives from Spyderco
- Byrd Rule, governing reconciliation in the U.S. Congress
- Byrd Polar and Climate Research Center at Ohio State University, U.S.
- Byrd Stadium, now SECU Stadium, at the University of Maryland, U.S.

== See also ==
- Bird (disambiguation)
- Birds (disambiguation)
