= 4468 (disambiguation) =

4468 may refer to:

- LNER Class A4 4468 Mallard, a steam locomotive
- NGC 4468, a galaxy
- PGC 4468, a pair of interacting galaxies
- 4468 Pogrebetskij, a minor planet
