= UGC 5101 =

Galaxy in the constellation of Ursa Major

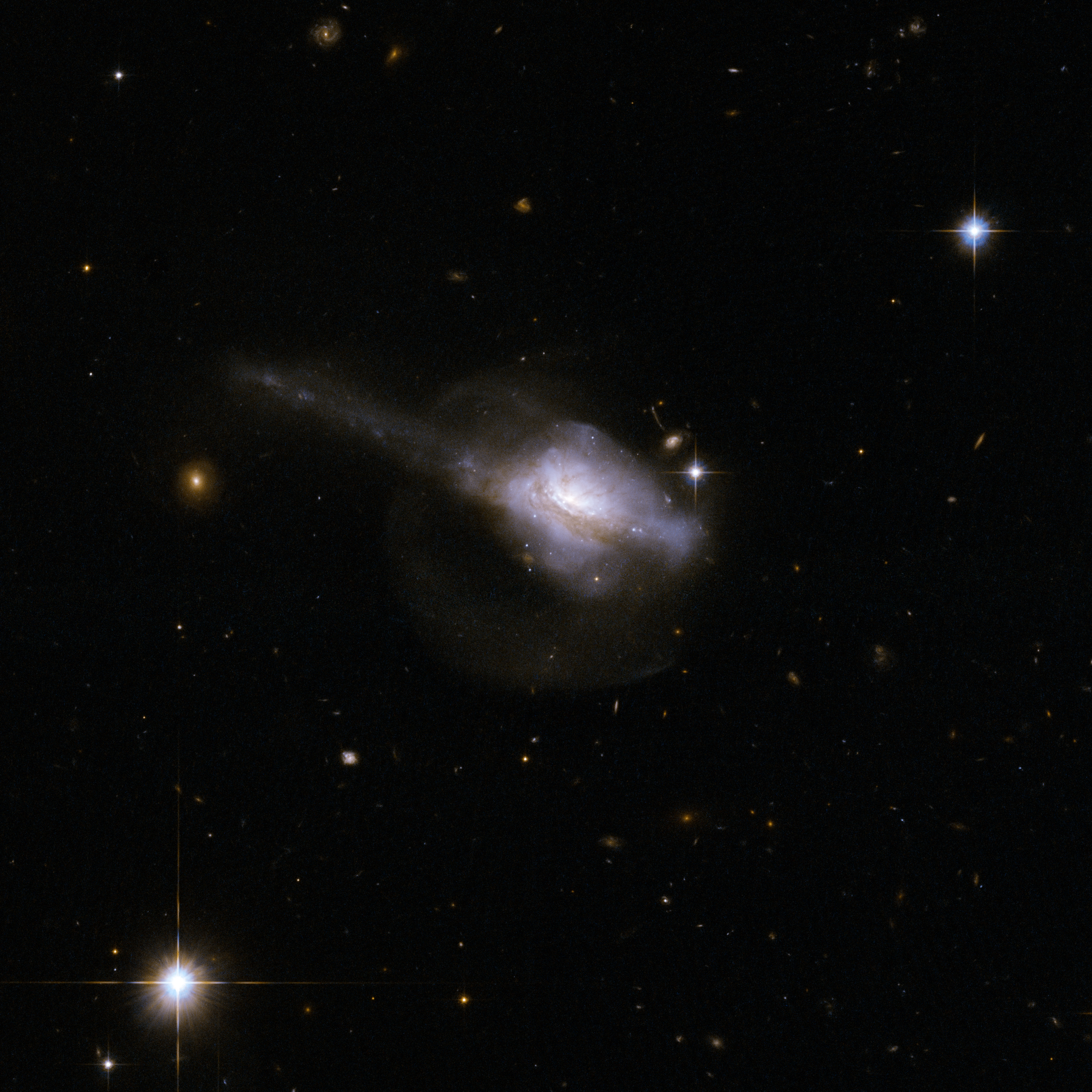
- UGC 5101 by the Hubble Space Telescope

Observation data (J2000 epoch)
- Constellation: Ursa Major
- Right ascension: 09^{h} 35^{m} 51.6^{s}
- Declination: +61° 21′ 11″
- Redshift: 0.039367 ± 0.000007
- Heliocentric radial velocity: 11,802 ± 2 km/s
- Distance: 528 Mly (162 Mpc)
- Apparent magnitude (V): 15.1

Characteristics
- Type: S?
- Apparent size (V): 0.83′ × 0.45′
- Notable features: Ultraluminous infrared galaxy

Other designations
- MCG +10-14-025, IRAS 09320+6134, PGC 27292

UGC 5101 is a galaxy merger located in the constellation Ursa Major. It is located at a distance of about 530 million light years from Earth. It is an ultraluminous infrared galaxy. The total infrared luminosity of the galaxy is estimated to be 10^{11.95} L_{☉} and the galaxy has a total star formation rate of 105 M_{☉} per year.

UGC 5101 has a single nucleus surrounded by spiral isophotes. The nucleus of UGC 5101 has been found to be active and it has been categorised as a type 1.5 Seyfert galaxy or a LINER based on the radio continuum. The most accepted theory for the energy source of active galactic nuclei is the presence of an accretion disk around a supermassive black hole. The mass of the black hole in the centre of UGC 5101 is estimated to be 10^{8.2} (160 million) M_{☉} based on stellar velocity dispersion. The galaxy also hosts a water megamaser, probably originating from the nucleus.

The nucleus emits hard X-rays, which are strongly absorbed, while there is also a soft X-rays component, which could originate from a hidden starburst region. Also NeV emission has been detected in the nucleus, indicating the presence of a hot gas in the coronal line region, while hot dust has been detected around the nucleus, as indicated by the presence of PAH emission and strong silicate absorption. The nucleus is surrounded by a dust torus with an opening angle larger than 41° which partly obstructs the nucleus with a column density of N^{H}_{LS} about 1.3×10^{24} cm^{−2}. The hole of the torus is covered with compton thin material. The integrated intensities of HCN to ^{13}CO indicate the gas in the torus is very dense. When observed with very-long-baseline interferometry the galaxy features a ridgeline that could be compact jets generated by the active nucleus.

The galaxy has a tidal tail, seen edge on, and a faint halo of stars that was created during the merger. A second tidal tail appears to loop around the nucleus, forming a ring.

== See also ==
- NGC 6240 and Markarian 273 - two other near ultraluminous infrared galaxies with active nuclei
