= Bird (given name) =

Bird is the given name of:

- Bird Stein Gans (1868–1944), American educator involved in parent education
- Bird Sim Coler (1867–1941), American Comptroller of Greater New York
- Bird Segle McGuire (1865–1930), American politician
- Bird Smith, a scouting leader in Malaysia in the 1920s and 1930s
- Bird Margaret Turner (1877–1962), American mathematician and university professor
- Bird J. Vincent (1880–1931), American soldier and politician

== See also ==
- Bird (surname)
- Bird (nickname)
