= NGC 4436 =

Lenticular or dwarf irregular galaxy in the constellation Virgo

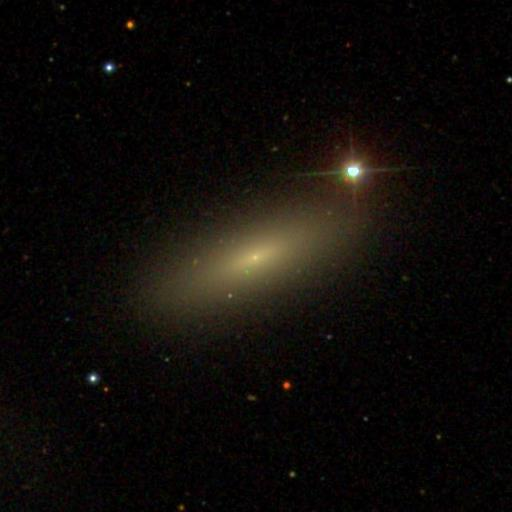
- SDSS image of NGC 4436.

Observation data (J2000 epoch)
- Constellation: Virgo
- Right ascension: 12^{h} 27^{m} 41.2^{s}
- Declination: 12° 18′ 57″
- Redshift: 0.003749/1124 km/s
- Distance: 51,832,772 ly
- Group or cluster: Virgo Cluster
- Apparent magnitude (V): 14.0

Characteristics
- Type: S0, dE6
- Size: ~ 31,500 ly (estimated)
- Apparent size (V): 1.91 x 0.67

Other designations
- PGC 40903, UGC 7573, VCC 1036

NGC 4436 is a lenticular or dwarf elliptical galaxy located about 60 million light-years away in the constellation of Virgo. NGC 4436 was discovered by astronomer William Herschel on April 17, 1784. The galaxy is a member of the Virgo Cluster.

== Interaction with NGC 4431 ==
NGC 4436 is undergoing a tidal interaction with a nearby dwarf elliptical galaxy known as NGC 4431. The two galaxies are separated by around 58,680 light-years (18 kpc).

== See also ==
- List of NGC objects (4001–5000)
- NGC 4468
