= Tom Smith (West Virginia politician) =

American highway engineer and politician

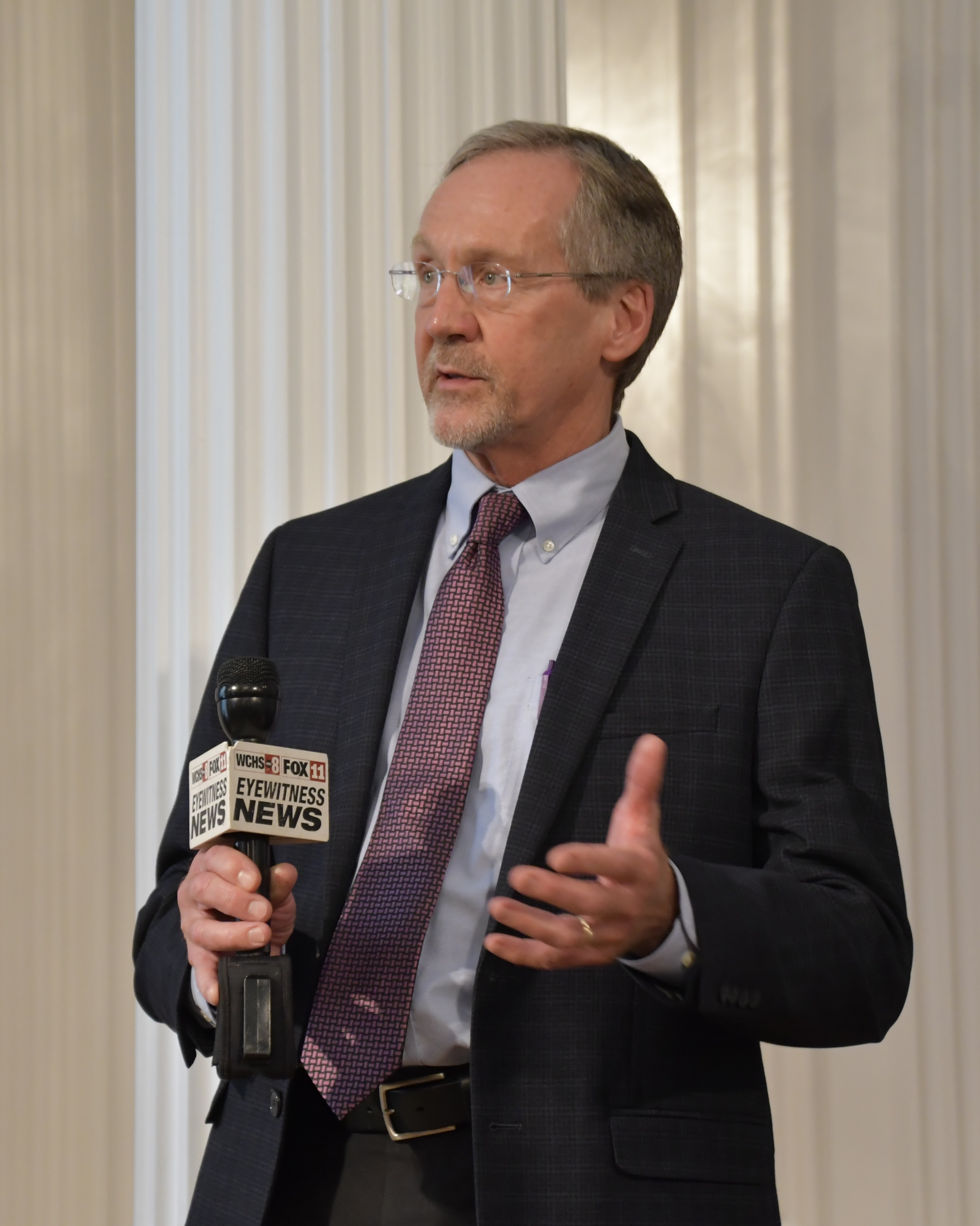

Secretary of Transportation of West Virginia
- In office January 14, 2017 – March 10, 2019
- Governor: Jim Justice
- Preceded by: [data missing]
- Succeeded by: Byrd White

Personal details
- Born: [data missing] [data missing]
- Political party: [data missing]
- Education: [data missing]

Tom Smith (Thomas J. Smith, P.E.) is an American highway engineer and former West Virginia state government official. He was fired on March 10, 2019 by Governor Jim Justice as West Virginia's Secretary of Transportation over a dispute about maintenance of secondary roads.

He was appointed to the position in 2017.

Smith's successor as secretary of transportation is Byrd White, who took office on March 26, 2019.
