= Bird (nickname) =

Bird or The Bird is a nickname for:

- Bird Averitt (1952–2020), American National Basketball Association and American Basketball Association player
- Charlie Parker (1920–1955), American jazz musician
- Ian Eagle (born 1969), American sportscaster
- Lady Bird Johnson (1912–2007), wife of US President Lyndon B. Johnson
- Mark Fidrych (1954–2009), American baseball pitcher
- Mutsuhiro Watanabe (1918–2003), Japanese World War II sergeant and war criminal
- George Yardley (1928–2004), American basketball player
- Kathleen York, American singer, songwriter and actress
- Claudio Cangia, Argentinian football player.

== See also ==
- Dodo (nickname)
- Bird (disambiguation)
- Bird (given name)
