= Birdz =

Birdz may refer to:

- Birdz (rapper) (born 1990), an Indigenous Australian rapper and record producer
- Birdz (TV series), a Canadian animated series broadcast from 1998 until 1999
- "Birdz", a song by Denzel Curry featuring Rick Ross from the 2019 album Zuu

== See also ==
- Birds (disambiguation)
