= Byrd Gibbens =

American historian and professor (born 1936)

- Born: Elizabeth Gibbens; June 5, 1936; Tyler, Texas, U.S.
- Died: December 20, 2023 (aged 87)
- Citizenship: American
- Occupations: Historian; professor
- Employers: University of New Mexico; University of Arkansas at Little Rock; University of New Orleans
- Known for: History of the American West

Elizabeth "Byrd" Gibbens (June 5, 1936 – December 20, 2023) was an American historian and professor.

== Life ==
Gibbens was born in Tyler, Texas, on June 5, 1936, and grew up in Baton Rouge, Louisiana. As a young woman, she became a nun in the Sisters of St. Joseph, leaving the religious order in 1977 to pursue higher education. She subsequently earned a PhD in literature and American Studies with an emphasis on folklore.

As of 2002 she was a professor of English at the University of New Mexico. She also taught at the University of Arkansas.

She died on December 20, 2023, at the age of 87.

== Selected publications ==
- This is a Strange Country: Letters of a Westering Family, 1880-1906 (1988, University of New Mexico Press: ISBN 9780826311078)
- Far from Home: Families of the Westward Journey by Lillian Schlissel, Byrd Gibbens, and Elizabeth Hampsten (2002, U of Nebraska Press: ISBN 9780803292956
