= Bird Key (Miami) =

Island in Miami, Florida, United States

Coordinates: 25°50′21.05″N 80°10′06.00″W

Bird Key is a small uninhabited island within the city of Miami, Florida. It is located in Biscayne Bay, just east of the Upper Eastside neighborhood and south of the 79th Street Causeway. It is one of only two naturally formed islands in the upper bay, and is the only privately owned, uninhabited island.

== Overview ==
Visiting the island without the owner's consent is considered trespassing. Trespassers disturb the colony of diverse, native birds that use the island as a rookery. For decades, the island eluded writers and historians, its history locked away in library microfiche and out-of-print books. But, in 2012, the Miami Herald published a feature on Bird Key recounting its storied past. At that time, Bird Key was awash in trash, which was later cleaned by employees of Pelican Harbor Seabird Station and a group of volunteers.

== Concern ==
In April 2024, Bird Key's owner, Finlay Matheson, put the island on the market for $31.5 million, worrying environmentalists due to the fact that Bird Key is zoned residential by Miami-Dade County and could, potentially, be developed with local governmental approval. As of May 2024, various state and environmental groups were reportedly working together to buy the island and preserve it as a rookery. The details of those negotiations are not yet known.

== See also ==
- Picnic Islands
