= NGC 6670 =

Interacting Galaxies in the constellation Draco

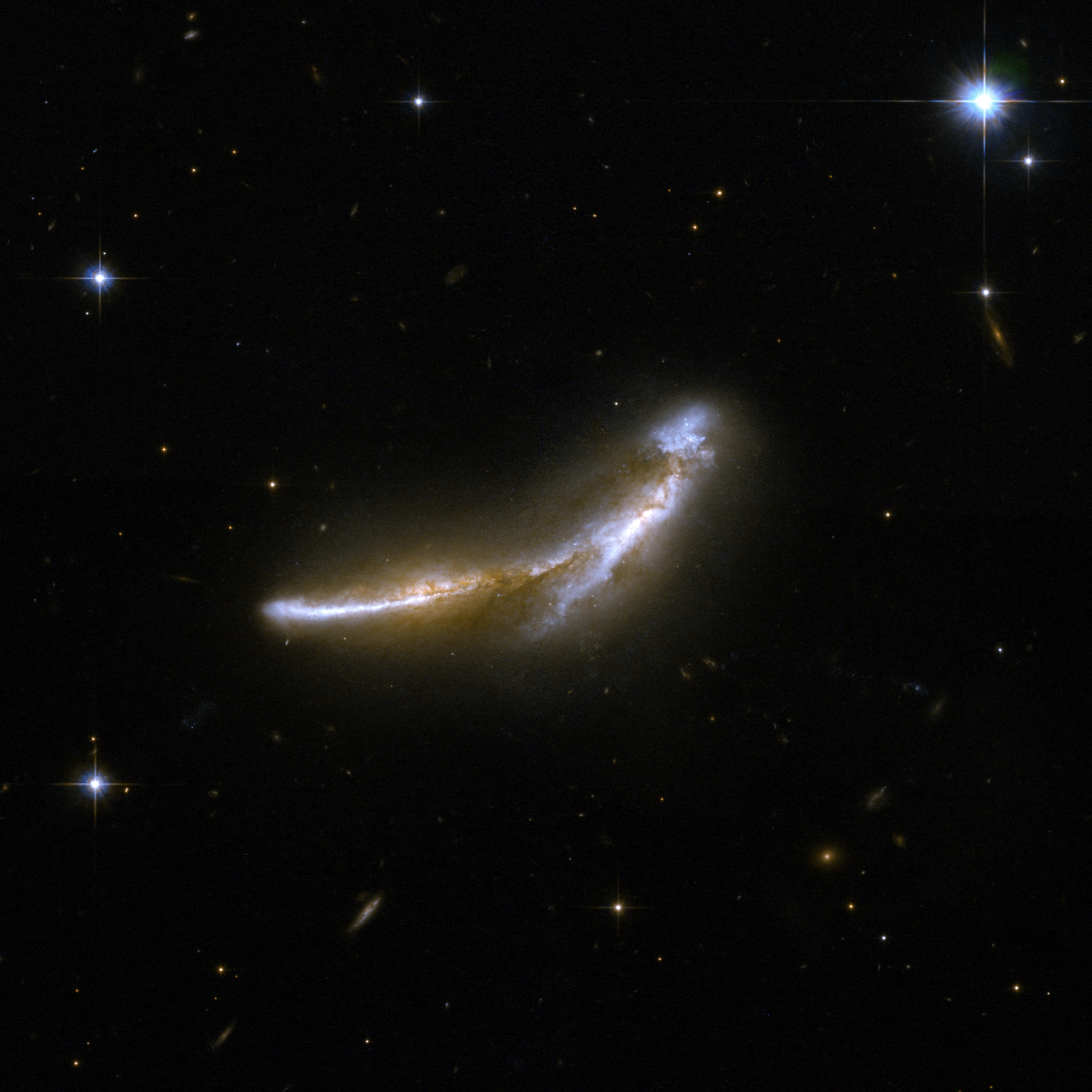
- NGC 6670 as seen by the Hubble Space Telescope

Observation data (J2000 epoch)
- Constellation: Draco
- Right ascension: 18^{h} 33^{m} 33.4^{s} (NGC 6670E) - 18^{h} 33^{m} 33.7^{s} (NGC 6670W)
- Declination: +59° 53′ 16″ (NGC 6670E) - +59° 53′ 23″ (NGC 6670W)
- Redshift: 8512 km/s
- Distance: 401 million
- Apparent magnitude (V): 14.3
- Apparent magnitude (B): 15.1

Characteristics
- Type: S
- Size: 1.0

Other designations
- IRAS 18329+5950, NGC 6670A, UGC 11284, MCG +10-26-044, PGC 62033, CGCG 301-31

NGC 6670 is a pair of interacting galaxies within the constellation Draco, which lie around 401 million light-years from Earth. Its shape resembles a leaping dolphin. NGC 6670 was discovered by Lewis A. Swift on July 31, 1886. NGC 6670 is a combination of two colliding disc galaxies which are known as NGC 6670E and NGC 6670W. The galaxy is 100 billion times brighter than the Sun. The galaxies have already collided once before and they are now moving towards each other again nearing a second collision. Its apparent magnitude is 14.3, its size is 1.0 arc minutes.

== NGC 6670E ==
NGC 6670E (also known as NGC 6670-1 and NGC 6670B) is a disc galaxy on the north-eastern side of NGC 6670. It has mostly been destroyed by its collision with NGC 6670W. It has a bright nuclear region with a luminosity of 18 L_{☉}/M_{bol} due to a large amount of star formation. Its star formation efficiency is at least four times higher than the Milky Way disc, and is approaching the starburst phase. This large amount of star formation is likely to be caused by its collision with NGC 6670W. To the south-east of the nucleus there is a bright and fuzzy area caused by dust extinction or a large concentration of blue stars. NGC 6670E is in-front of NGC 6670W and they are moving towards each other. The movement of the H I region of this galaxy has been disrupted by its collision with NGC 6670W.

== NGC 6670W ==
NGC 6670W (also known as NGC 6670-2 and NGC 6670A) is a disc galaxy on the south-western side of NGC 6670. It forms the larger part of NGC 6670. It has remained mostly intact after its collision with NGC 6670E. Its nuclear region is slightly dimmer than NGC 6670E, being measured at 11 L_{☉}/M_{bol}, but this number still indicates a higher than normal level of star production. Both the western and eastern sides of the disc are significantly curved. The H I region of NGC 6670W is a rotating ring. The western end of the galaxy has a stronger radio continuum peak indicating that it may be a recent star forming region.
