= Bird Margaret Turner =

American mathematician (1877–1962)

- Born: April 18, 1877; Moundsville, West Virginia
- Died: September 5, 1962 (aged 85); Moundsville, West Virginia
- Education: West Virginia University; Bryn Mawr College
- Occupations: Mathematician, educator

Bird Margaret Turner (April 18, 1877 – September 5, 1962) was an American mathematician and university professor from Moundsville, West Virginia. She was one of the relatively few American women who earned their PhDs in mathematics before World War II.

== Biography ==
Bird Margaret Turner was the second of five children born to Mary Jane Douglas and John Marion Turner, farmers in Moundsville.

In 1893, she graduated from the local Moundsville High School and went to work right away as an elementary school teacher. In 1900, she was hired to teach mathematics at her alma mater, Moundsville High School. During summer breaks until 1914, she took advanced level mathematics courses at West Virginia University (WVU), although in the summer of 1906, she studied at Harvard University, and during the summer break in 1908, she briefly attended Bethany College in West Virginia.

In 1913, she resigned from the high school faculty to take on a position at WVU as a student assistant in mathematics. There, she completed her BA degree in 1915 at 38 with majors in mathematics and physics.

In 1915, she returned to Moundsville High School as principal, even as she was beginning graduate school studies in mathematics at WVU. She received her master's degree in mathematics from WVU in 1917. The year before, she had moved to Bryn Mawr College and was awarded the President M. Carey Thomas European Fellowship based on her work during her first year of study.

At Bryn Mawr College, she was hired to be assistant director of the Phebe Anna Thorn Model School from 1917 to 1918. She worked as a part-time mathematics instructor until 1919, and for the following year was a Resident Fellow. She did her doctoral studies under the direction of mathematicians Charlotte Angas Scott, Anna Pell Wheeler, Matilde Castro, and Olive Hazlett. In 1920, she was awarded her PhD under Scott and Elizabeth Ruth Burke with her dissertation titled "Plane Cubics with a Given Quadrangle of Inflexions," which was published in the American Journal of Mathematics, Volume 44, October 1922.

After receiving her doctorate, she taught at the University of Illinois for three years before assuming the position of assistant professor of mathematics at West Virginia University. In 1925, she was named an associate professor and, in 1931, she was promoted to full professor. She taught at WVU for a total of 24 years before retiring from teaching in 1947 at the age of 70 as professor emeritus.

Four years later, she returned to Moundsville, where she made her last home. She died there on September 5, 1962, and was buried in the city's Mt. Rose Cemetery.

== Memberships ==
- American Mathematical Society
- Mathematical Association of America (charter member)
- American Association for the Advancement or Science
- Phi Beta Kappa

== Selected works ==
- Turner, Bird Margaret. "Plane cubics with a given quadrangle of inflexions." American Journal of Mathematics 44, no. 4 (1922): 261-278.
- Turner, Bird Margaret. "On the positions of the imaginary points of inflexion and critical centers of a real cubic," Annals of Mathematics, June 1922.
- Turner, Bird Margaret. "A configuration of thirteen pencils of cubics and cubics with three real inflexions. American Journal of Mathematics. 47:149-162. Reviews: JFM 51.0514.01 (W. Fr. Meyer); Rev. semestr. publ. math. 32, pt. 1: 2-3
