= UGC 8335 =

Pair of galaxies in Ursa Major

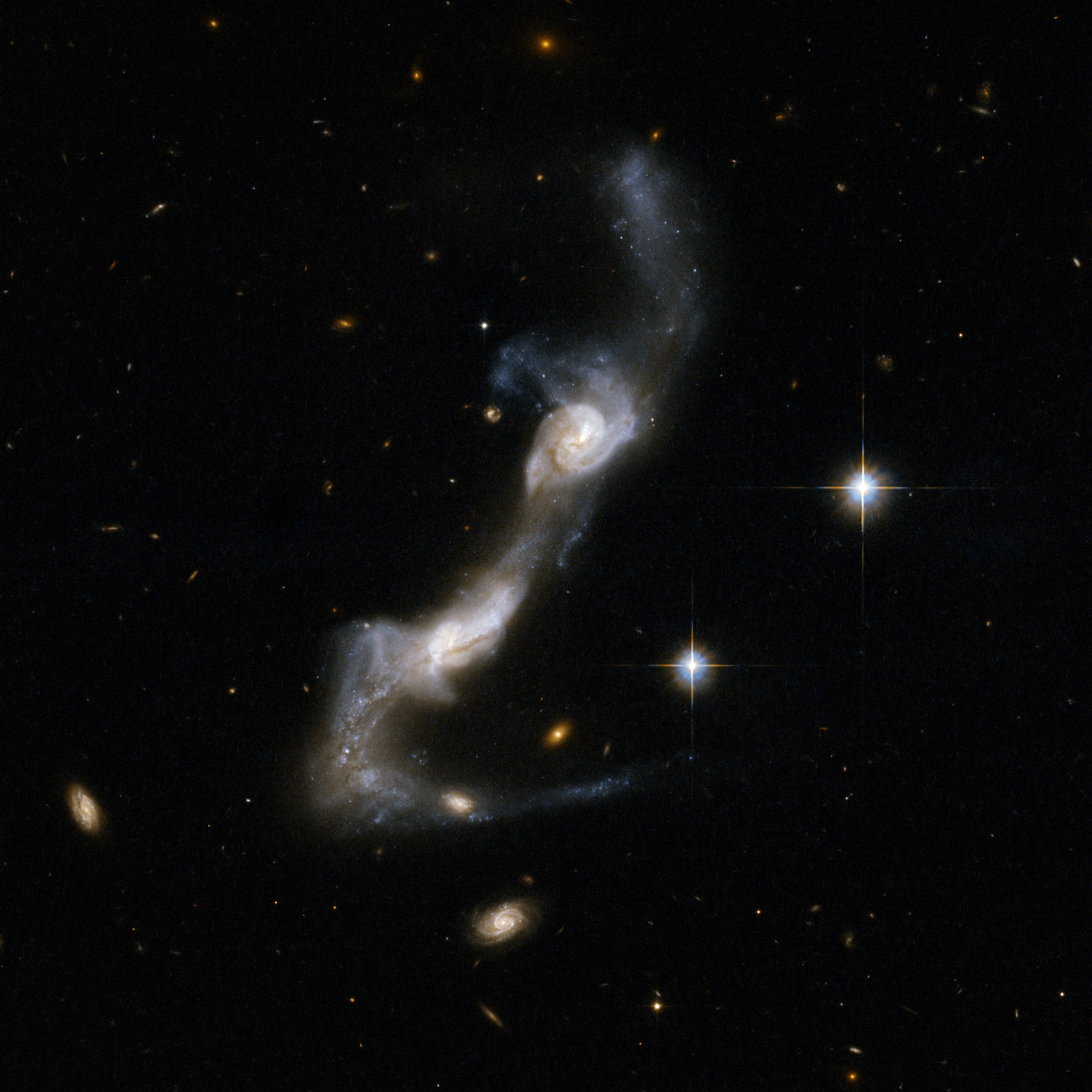
- An image of UGC 8335 taken in 2002 by the Hubble Space Telescope

Observation data (J2000 epoch)
- Constellation: Ursa Major
- Right ascension: 13^{h} 15^{m} 32.8^{s}
- Declination: +62° 07′ 37″
- Redshift: 0.030831 ± 0.000097
- Heliocentric radial velocity: 9243 ± 29 km/s
- Galactocentric velocity: 9364 ± 29 km/s
- Distance: 128.3 ± 9.0 Mpc (418 ± 29 Mly) h^{−1}_{0.73}
- Apparent magnitude (V): 14.4 ± 0.4
- Absolute magnitude (V): -21.19 ± 0.64

Characteristics
- Size: 65.05 kpc × 26.67 kpc (212.2 kly × 87.0 kly)
- Apparent size (V): 1.70′ × 0.70′

Other designations
- KPG 369, Arp 238, PGC 46133, VV 250

UGC 8335 (Arp 238) is a pair of strongly interacting spiral galaxies. They have been distorted by extreme tidal forces, creating prominent tidal tails and a bridge of gas and stars between the galaxies.

UGC 8335 is about 400 million light-years from Earth, in the constellation Ursa Major. It is the 238th object in Halton Arp's Atlas of Peculiar Galaxies.

== Supernova ==
On 25 April 2012, Doug Rich discovered supernova SN 2012by in UGC 8335. At the time of discovery, the supernova had a magnitude of 17.6. A peak magnitude measurement of 17.3 was recorded two days later, on April 27. SN 2012by was classified as a Type II supernova by Tomasella et al. at the Astronomical Observatory of Padova. The research group also found that its spectrum was similar to that of SN 1996as.
