= Byrd White =

Byrd White is a West Virginia accountant and state government official. He was appointed in March 2019 by Governor Jim Justice as West Virginia's Secretary of Transportation as a replacement for Tom Smith, who Justice had fired over a dispute about maintenance of secondary roads.

White is a former Raleigh County Commissioner and highway construction company executive.
