= Birds of Tokyo (disambiguation) =

Birds of Tokyo are an Australian alternative rock band from Perth.

Birds of Tokyo may also refer to:

- Birds of Tokyo (album), their eponymous 2010 album
- Birds of Tokyo (EP), their eponymous 2005 EP

== See also ==
- List of birds of Japan
