= Nilon Bombers =

British Pop band

- Origin: Cheltenham, England
- Genres: Power pop, Britpop
- Years active: 1992–1996
- Label: Almo Sounds
- Past members: Drew Norton; Gareth Ballard; Kim Dorman; Martin Williams

Nilon Bombers were a Britpop band from Cheltenham, formed in 1992. They split up in November 1996.

The line-up was Drew Norton (vocals, guitar), Gareth Ballard (guitar, vocals, bouzouki, keyboards and violin), Martin Williams (drums), and Kim Dorman (bass).

They released an album titled Bird on Almo Sounds in 1996 which was produced by Kim Fowley. It was described by Roy Wilkinson in Select as combining "Mega City Four's Transit-frequenting worthiness with the everyman rock of Ian McNabb...stultifyingly competent". Their most successful single, "Superstar", reached no. 96 on the UK Singles Chart in May 1996. The band's final single, "I'm Not Built for This", was described by Tania Branigan in Melody Maker as "Two years too late for New Wave of New Wave".

In July 1996 they were a last-minute addition at the T in the Park festival at Strathclyde Country Park where they were first on in the King Tuts Wah Wah tent.

After the band split up, Williams went on to form Silverman.

== Discography ==
=== Albums ===
- Nilon Bombers (1995), Almo Sounds
- Bird (1996), Almo Sounds

=== Singles ===
- "Cleo" (1995), Almo Sounds
- "Cracked" (1995), Almo Sounds
- "Superstar" (1996), Almo Sounds – UK no. 96
- "I'm Not Built for This" (1996), Almo Sounds
