= The Birds (painting) =

Painting by Georges Braque

- Artist: Georges Braque
- Year: 1952-1953
- Medium: ceiling decoration
- Dimensions: 270 cm × 212 cm (110 in × 83 in)
- Location: Louvre, Paris

The Birds or The Two Birds (French: Les Oiseaux) is a monumental 1952–1953 ceiling painting by Georges Braque in the Salle Henri II in the Louvre, which had to be renovated at that time. He was commissioned by Georges Salles, director of the museums of France. It was unveiled in 1953. The artist succeeded in scaling an intimate theme dear to him up to a monumental scale. He resolved the problem posed by the vast canvas by using large blocks of colour, giving the work as a whole strength and simplicity.

== Birds in Braque's work ==
Braque began introducing the theme of the bird into his Ateliers series in 1949 with Atelier IV (oil on canvas, private collection). He worked on this theme from 1952 until his death, digging deeper and deeper into the bird concept and multiplying the references to flight. The artist went to observe a bird reserve in Camargue where he admired the flight of pink flamingos:

... I saw large birds passing by. From this vision, I drew aerial shapes. Birds inspired me .... The very concept, after the shock of inspiration, made them rise in my mind; this concept must fade to bring me closer to what concerns me: the construction of the pictorial fact.

Braque stylized the flat shapes and simplified them to the extreme in the following years. Les Oiseaux noirs (1956–57 or 1960 depending on the sources, Adrien Maeght collection) are representative of the bird concept, as are À tire d'aile (1956–1961, Center Pompidou Paris). In the painting The Birds (1960) the concept is reduced to signs, almost abstract, playing with light. Braque kept The Bird and its nest (oil and sand on canvas, Center Georges Pompidou) until his death.

== Production ==
The project was an enormous task for the painter who was then seventy years old. Braque examined the place at length and declared that he would decide whether to accept the commission only after asking his wife's opinion. Although Madame Braque advised that he was much too old to start making ceilings, Braque ultimately declared himself ready to do the decoration. Reconnecting with his first job as a painter and decorator, Georges Braque announced the chosen theme and the compensation he would require. Braque's price was accepted immediately, but Georges Salles questioned the novelty of the motif—he had hoped for a "tailor-made Braque" which the painter did not want. Braque remained firm and first created several models to define his colors. He directed his assistant Pierre Pallut to climb to the top of a large ladder with pieces of sky to judge the chromatic effect.

The models were then reproduced on large canvases which constitute the decorative panels. These models were gouaches on paper, part of which was presented at the Georges Braque 2013 exhibition at the Galeries nationales du Grand Palais, Paris. Several options were studied by the artist: Study for the ceiling of the Louvre (1953, gouache on paper), with a single bird on a yellow and blue background; Study for the ceiling of the Louvre (1953, gouache on paper), with a single bird on a yellow background and two black birds outlined in yellow on a blue background; and Study for the ceiling of the Louvre (1953, gouache on paper), with two black birds surrounded by white on a blue background, and the appearance of two stars and the crescent moon. These three studies are at the Musées de Belfort, donated by Maurice Jardot.

Three other studies, all entitled Study for the ceiling of the Louvre 1, 2 and 3, are part of a private collection. They are identical in size: 30 by 18.5 centimetres (11.8 in × 7.3 in). Study 3 is dedicated to Georges Salles and dated January 4, 1953; it has neither moon nor star and one of the birds is blue on a lighter blue background. Study 2 is close to the final painting with stars and moon. Study 1 presents a single bird on a white and blue background

== Reception ==
Sometimes criticized, sometimes praised, this monumental painting and especially its theme, The Two Birds, immediately gave rise to conceptually similar creations, and art collectors developed a particular interest in Braque's paintings from the bird period. Duncan Phillips, who could not finance the purchase of one of the works exhibited at the Aimé Maeght gallery in 1956, asked Braque for authorization to reproduce one of the birds in bas-relief. Braque granted it to him for reasonable remuneration. Pierre Bourdelle, son of the sculptor Antoine Bourdelle, created this bird in brown granite which is in the Phillips collection. A few years later, Duncan Phillips bought the bird for the Phillips collection of which it became the emblem: L'Oiseau (Bird, 1956, oil on canvas, The Phillips Collection.

The Birds of the Louvre also fascinated Alfred Hitchcock, who commissioned a mosaic replica applied to a wall for his garden in Scott Valley in the Santa Cruz Mountains, California. The filmmaker hoped that the artist would come and install it in person.

For the chapel of the Maeght Foundation, Aimé Maeght commissioned a stained glass window replica of the two birds also entitled Les Deux oiseaux.

== Bibliography ==
- Collectif RMN (2013). Braque, l'expo. Paris: Réunion des musées nationaux et du Grand Palais des Champs-Élysées. ISBN 978-2-7118-6109-5.
- Danchev, Alex (2013). Georges Braque, le défi silencieux (in French). Éditions Hazan. ISBN 978-2-7541-0701-3. (First edition, 2005, Penguin Books, in English; translated into French by Jean-François Allain.)
- Ferrier, Jean-Louis; Le Pichon, Yann (1988). L'Aventure de l'art au xxe siècle (in French). Préface by Pontus Hultén. Paris: Chêne-Hachette. ISBN 2-85108-509-3.
- Leymarie, Jean (1967), Braque : f (in Italian), Geneva: Skira-Fabbri, p. 134
- Verdet, André (1988) [1956]. Kister, René (ed.). Georges Braque (in French). Geneva: Éditions Galilée. ISBN 978-2-7186-0099-4.
- Worms de Romilly, Nicole (1982). Braque, le cubisme : fin 1907–1914 (in French). Paris: Adrien Maeght. ISBN 2-85587-100-X.
- Zurcher, Bernard (1988). Braque vie et œuvre (in French). Fribourg: Office du livre. ISBN 2-09-284742-2.
