= Arp 256 =

Interacting galaxies in the constellation Cetus

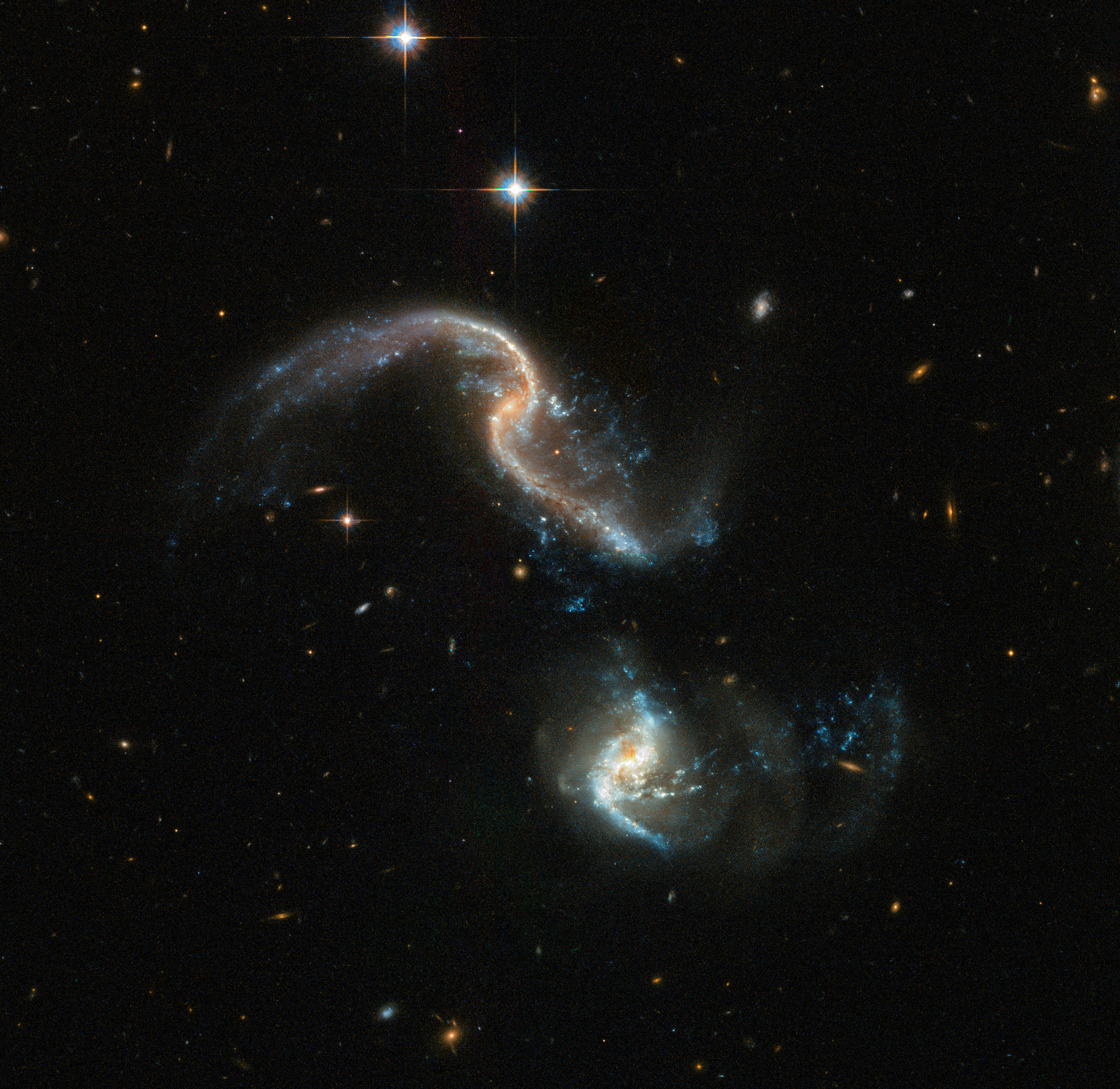
- Image taken by Hubble Space Telescope.

Observation data (J2000 epoch)
- Constellation: Cetus
- Right ascension: 00^{h} 18^{m} 50.898^{s}
- Declination: −10° 22′ 36.49″
- Redshift: 0.027
- Heliocentric radial velocity: 7985 km/s
- Distance: 380 Mly (115 Mpc)
- Apparent magnitude (V): S: 14.33; N: 13.60
- Apparent magnitude (B): S: 14.81; N: 13

Characteristics
- Type: S: SB(s)b pec? N: SB(s)c pec
- Apparent size (V): S: 1.1′ × 0.6′ N: 1.1′ × 0.8′
- Notable features: Interacting galaxies

Other designations
- Arp 256S: MCG-02-01-051, PGC 1224; Arp 256N: MCG-02-01-052, PGC 1221

Arp 256 is a pair of interacting barred spiral galaxies located 380 million light years away from Earth in the constellation of Cetus. Arp 256 (also Arp 256S) refers to the southern galaxy; the northern galaxy is Arp 256N.

Both galaxies are undergoing intense star formation as seen from the many blue dots in them. Arp 256N has two long ribbon shaped spiral arms full of gas, dust and stars.

== Supernova ==
One supernova has been observed in Arp 256N:

- SN 2010hp (Type II, mag. 17.1) was discovered by the Infrared Supernova Search in Starburst Galaxies on 21 July 2010.
