= The Bird: The Life and Legacy of Mark Fidrych =

2013 book by Doug Wilson

- Author: Doug Wilson
- Language: English
- Publisher: Thomas Dunne Books a division of St. Martin's Press
- Publication date: 2013
- Publication place: United States
- Media type: Print (Hardcover)
- Pages: 306
- ISBN: 978-1-250-00492-5
- Dewey Decimal: 796.357

The Bird: The Life and Legacy of Mark Fidrych is a 2013 book that documents the life of Mark Fidrych a former professional baseball player who was known for his exceptional ability as a pitcher, his joyous attitude, and his on-field idiosyncrasies. The author, Doug Wilson, is an ophthalmologist and a member of the Society for American Baseball Research.

== Book summary ==
The book is divided into nine chapters.

Chapter 1. Northboro. Fidrych was born and raised in Northborough, Massachusetts. As a child and young adult, Fidrych excelled in athletics to include baseball, football, and basketball. He attended Algonquin Regional High School where, in addition to his athletic skills, was well known for his extroverted personality and friendly demeanor. While a student, Fidrych also played American Legion Baseball where he continued to burnish his reputation as one of the area's star pitching prospects.

Chapter 2. Bristol. In 1974, Fidrych was drafted by the Detroit Tigers, signed a contract that included a $3,000 signing bonus and reported to Bristol, Virginia where he played for Detroit's single-A minor league team, the Bristol Tigers. While at Bristol, his habit of talking to the baseball and patting down the pitcher's mound was first noticed by professional coaches. Bristol was also where Fidrych acquired his nickname "The Bird". The name was given to Fidrych by Jeff Hogan, one of the team's assistants who thought the tall pitcher with his floppy, curly blond hair reminded him of the Sesame Street character Big Bird. At the season's end, Fidrych was considered to be a major league prospect.

Chapter 3. Lakeland, Montgomery, and Evansville. Fidrych spent the 1975 baseball season being promoted through the Tiger's minor league system, finally reaching the triple-A level, one step below Major League Baseball when he was assigned to the Evansville Triplets, the Tiger's AAA franchise.

Chapter 4. Detroit In March 1976, Fidrych reported to the Tigers' spring training facility in Lakeland, Florida as a non-roster invitee. Fidrych enjoyed a successful spring training and the team's general manager Jim Campbell and team manager Ralph Houk decided to select Fidrych for the Tigers. On May 15, Fidrych made his first start as a pitcher and pitched a complete two hit game, defeating the Cleveland Indians by a score of 3–1. He also attracted the attention of media for his habits of talking the baseball and personally grooming the pitcher's mound between innings.

Chapter 5. Birdmania. Fidrych emerged on the national scene when he pitched in a network-televised baseball game of the week on June 28, 1976, defeating the New York Yankees. Over 50,000 fans attended the game, held in Detroit's Tiger Stadium. Over the next several weeks, Fidrych pitched in front of sold out stadiums both at home and on the road. At mid-season, Fidrych was selected to pitch in the all-star game. Fidrych finished the 1976 season with a 19–9 record and won the American League Rookie of the Year Award.

Chapter 6. "Slow-Down". During the baseball off season, Fidrych was in high demand and made numerous personal appearances. During the 1977 Tiger spring training session, he injured his knee while shagging fly balls, a duty often given to pitchers. Subsequently, his knee was operated on to remove and repair damaged cartilage. During his recovery, he published an autobiography which was panned by critics. Fidrych recovered from his surgery and made his first start on May 27, pitching a complete game but losing by a 2–1 score. He continued to pitch well until July 4, when his arm was injured in a game against the Baltimore Orioles. Although it would not be properly diagnosed until 1985, Fidrych had torn his rotator cuff, effectively ending his career.

Chapter 7. The Long Road Back. Fidrych enjoyed a successful 1978 spring training and regular season start, but his arm injury soon affected his ability to throw and the Tigers sent him back to the minor leagues. However, he was unable to pitch effectively at the lower level and was placed on the injured list for the remainder of the season. During his period of inactivity he was examined by the country's top doctors, none of whom could properly diagnose the injury. At the time, arthroscopic examinations and diagnosis had not yet become popular. Fidrych was ineffective in 1979, the last year of his Tiger contract. Nonetheless, he was invited to spring training in 1980, but continued to struggle in the minor leagues during the 1980 and 1981 seasons.

Chapter 8. Pawtucket. Fidrych attempted to restart his career in the Boston Red Sox organization and signed a minor league contract to pitch for the Pawtucket Red Sox. He finished the season with a 6–8 record but still drew sold out crowds. He returned in 1983, but his struggles continued and he voluntarily retired on June 28, 1983.

Chapter 9. Northboro Redux. After his baseball career ended, Fidrych retired to Northboro and worked on his 123 acre farm that he had purchased with his baseball earnings. His popularity remained and was the subject of many media features and interviews. In 1985, friends referred him to a young physician, Dr. James Andrews, who was pioneering the use of arthroscopy to examine joint injuries. During Fidrych's examination, Andrews discovered two severe tears in his rotator cuff. Andrews repaired the injuries and for the first time in eight years, Fidrych was pain-free. Unfortunately, at the age of 32, he was beyond the point of making a return to professional baseball. In the years following, Fidrych married, had children, and established himself as a successful business man, operating his farm and working as an independent construction contractor. He also volunteered for and worked with a number of charities. On April 13, 2009, he died in an accident while repairing one of his trucks on his farm.

In the book's epilogue, Wilson discusses Fidrych's career with former teammates. The last portion of the book is Wilson's acknowledgements.

== Reviews ==
The book has garnered many positive reviews by critics who enjoyed taking the trip back to the mid-1970s when Fidrych's performance electrified the world of professional baseball.

"[Byrd] ... is paid handsome tribute by Wilson, whose prose is mostly clear and straightforward, who has talked to just about everybody (though apparently Fidrych’s widow and daughter declined to cooperate), and he has come up with one wonderful quotation after another. “The Bird” is the funniest and most touching baseball book to come my way in a long time, and it gets the 2013 season off to a splendid start."

"Wilson deftly reminds us of the moribund state of baseball back then, the backlash palpable as the monster salaries of free agency shocking and appalling fans while the rise of football’s popularity pushed the national pastime into secondary status. Into this social milieu of young versus old, rich versus poor, tradition versus modern came the unexpected emergence of Fidrych and his innocence and joy that captured hearts and imaginations for the entire Bicentennial summer.

"Wilson is not the most graceful prose stylist, but he has clear affection for the star-crossed Fidrych, and that passion, not to mention the built-in interesting story, overcomes some clunky writing. Fidrych, whose post-baseball career showed a man truly contented with life and with a deep passion for giving back to the world, died in 2009. Fidrych transfixed the country, albeit too briefly. This book serves as a reminder of why."
