= Murders of Byrd and Melanie Billings =

2009 shooting in Pensacola, Florida, United States

- Byrd and Melanie Billings
- Location: Pensacola, Florida, U.S.
- Date: July 9, 2009; 17 years ago
- Weapon: Gun
- Deaths: 2
- No. of participants: 8
- Motive: home invasion
- Accused: see Perpetrators
- Charges: first-degree murder and home invasion robbery

The murders of Byrd and Melanie Billings occurred on or around July 9, 2009, in Pensacola, Florida, United States. Byrd Billings, 66, and his wife, Melanie, 43, were found shot to death on July 9, 2009. The suspects, dressed in "ninja garb," stole a safe and other items during the break-in at the sprawling Billings home west of Pensacola. Nine of their children were home at the time, but were not hurt by the intruders. The family's attorney said that the safe contained jewelry, family papers, and prescription medications.

== Victims ==
Byrd Starling Billings divorced his second wife Cynthia Reeve Billings in January 1993. Four months later, he married his third wife, Melanie Anne Billings (née Brock) who already had two biological children from previous relationships, Ashley Markham and Nicole "Nikki" Billings (died in 2008). Melanie was 17 years old when she gave birth to Ashley and 19 years old when she gave birth to Nikki.

Byrd Billings reportedly had two biological children also (not with Melanie Billings).

They had a total of 16 children, including each other's stepchildren and adoptive children. (Note: Other sources report the Billings had 15 children (2 biological, 13 adopted) or 17 children (4 biological, 13 adopted).) One source said 13 of the children were adopted. Before the couple's murder, three of their adopted children, many of whom had special needs, had died.

At the time of their death, Melanie Billings owned a used car lot and Byrd Billings had a company named Worldco Financial Services. Byrd Billings was also a used car dealer and former strip club owner.

== Trials and sentencing ==
Seven men were charged with first-degree murder and home invasion robbery, and an eighth suspect was charged with being an accessory after the fact.

In October 2010, Leonard Patrick Gonzalez Jr. was on trial for first-degree murder facing a possible death sentence in Escambia County Circuit Court in Pensacola. The Billings had 16 cameras located around the residence to help them observe their children, and some of the video footage was shown in court. Gonzalez was identified in one video by Frederick Thornton, one of his accomplices, as the person who shot Byrd Billings.

On February 17, 2011, it was announced that Gonzalez was to be sentenced to death for the first-degree murders. On April 10, 2014, Gonzalez's conviction and sentence of death were affirmed on direct appeal by the Florida Supreme Court.

== Perpetrators ==
A total of eight people were convicted for planning and participating in the crimes. The five criminals who entered the Billings' home, the two criminals who drove the getaway vehicles, and the criminal who helped dispose of the stolen property, were all found/pled guilty and received the following sentences:

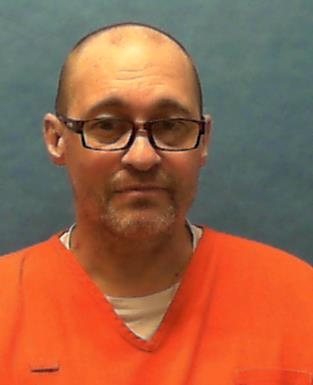
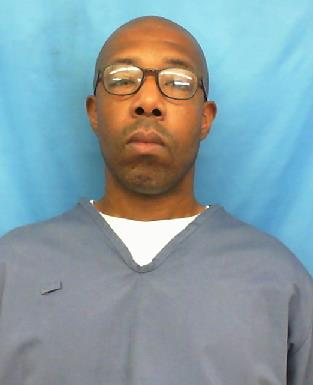
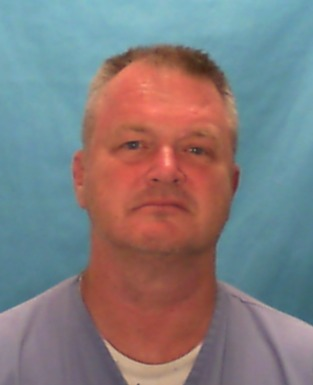
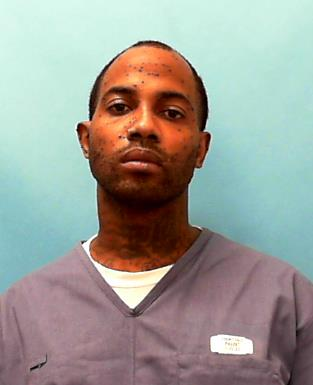
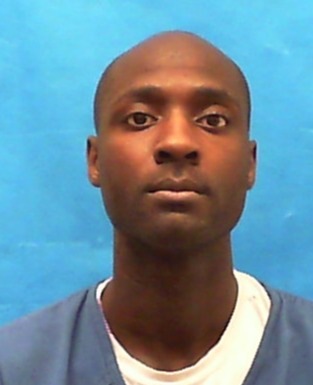
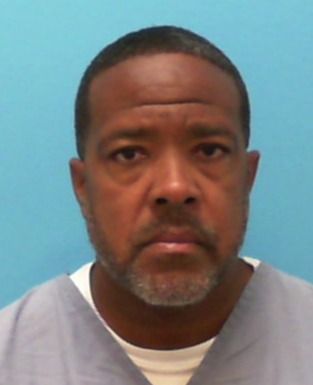
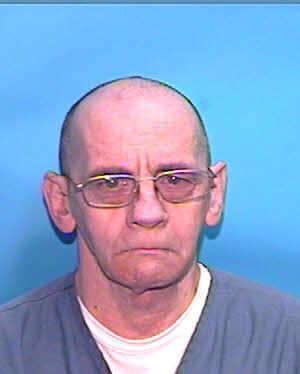
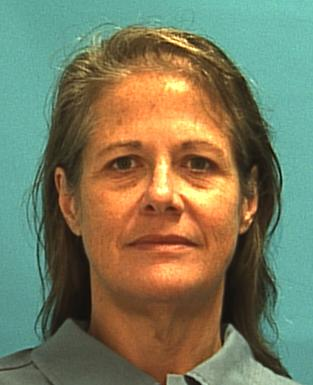
- Top left: Leonard Patrick Gonzalez Jr,
- Top right: Donnie Stallworth
- Second left: Wayne Coldiron
- Second right: Frederick Thornton
- Third left: Rakeem Florence
- Third right: Gary L. Sumner Jr
- Bottom left: Leonard Patrick Gonzalez Sr.
- Bottom right: Pamela Long-Wiggins
- Leonard Patrick Gonzalez Jr. – jury conviction of two death penalties for two counts of first-degree murder and a life sentence for one count of home invasion robbery with a firearm.
- Donnie Stallworth – two consecutive life sentences for two counts first-degree murder, lengthy prison sentence for one count of home invasion robbery with a firearm (effectively permanent life in prison).
- Wayne Coldiron – two consecutive life sentences for two counts first-degree murder, lengthy prison sentence for one count of home invasion robbery with a firearm (effectively permanent life in prison).
- Frederick Thornton – plea agreement, and testified against co-defendants, resulting in two concurrent 40-year sentences for two counts second-degree murder, concurrent 22-year sentence for one count of home invasion robbery with a firearm (totals 22 years in prison then 18 years' probation).
- Rakeem Florence – plea agreement, and testified against co-defendants, resulting in two concurrent 45-year sentences for two counts second-degree murder, concurrent 24-year sentence for one count of home invasion robbery with a firearm (totals 24 years in prison then 21 years' probation).
- Gary Sumner – back of house getaway driver, plea agreement resulting in two concurrent 20-year sentences for two counts second-degree murder, concurrent 20-year sentence for one count of home invasion robbery with a firearm.
- Leonard Patrick Gonzalez Sr. – front of house getaway driver, plea agreement resulting in two concurrent 17 1/2-year sentences for two counts second-degree murder, concurrent 17 1/2-year sentence for one count of home invasion robbery with a firearm. Leonard Gonzalez Sr. died on June 13, 2015, in prison.
- Pamela Long-Wiggins – jury conviction resulting in concurrent 28-year and 12-year sentences for two counts of accessory after the fact to a felony. Pamela Wiggins died in prison July 23, 2015.
