= Bird Stein Gans =

American educator

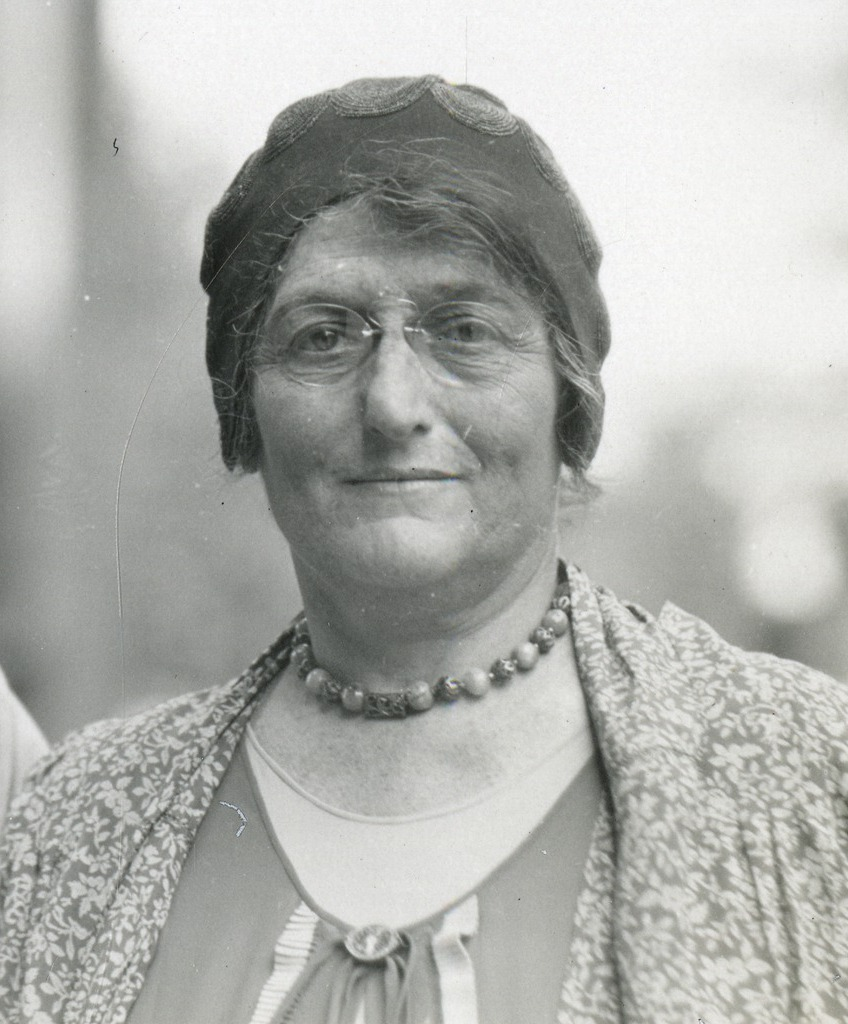
- Gans c. 1940

Bird Stein Gans (May 29, 1868 – December 29, 1944) was an American educator involved in parent education. Born in Allegheny City, Pennsylvania, she studied at Columbia University, the New School for Social Research, and New York University. She was founder and president of the Society for the Study of Child Nature from 1897 to 1938. She was a cousin to author Gertrude Stein.
