= Elizabeth Hampsten =

American historian and author (1932–2025)

Elizabeth Grace Hampsten (March 21, 1932 – June 16, 2026) was an American historian, academic and author. She was the Chester Fritz Distinguished Professor of English, emeritus, at the University of North Dakota. Hampsten died on June 16, 2026, at the age of 94.

== Bibliography ==
- Mother's Letters
- Read This Only to Yourself: The Private Writings of Midwestern Women, 1880-1910
- Settlers' Children: Growing Up on the Great Plains
- The Ballad of Johnny Sosa
- Far from Home: Families of the Westward Journey
- Day In, Day Out: Women's Lives in North Dakota
