= Bird (technology) =

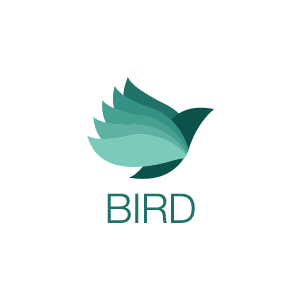
- Developer: MUV Interactive
- Type: Active human sensing
- Generation: 1
- Released: October 2015
- Website: muvinteractive.com (archived from August 11, 2020)

Bird is an interactive input device designed by Israel-based startup, MUV Interactive, which develops technology for wearable interfaces. Bird connects to computers to make any surface an interactive 3D environment. The device features remote touch, touchpad swipe control, gesture control, touchscreen capabilities, voice command recognition, a laser pointer, and other advanced options.

== History ==
Rami Parham, CEO and founder of MUV Interactive, established the company in 2011 with his brother and aimed to create an advanced way of interacting with connected devices. Parham founded MUV Interactive in Herzliya, Israel with COO Yuval Ben-Zeev.

In 2013, MUV Interactive raised seed funding from investors, including the OurCrowd funding platform, for the development of Bird. Pre-orders for Bird began in 2015, and the device shipped to thousands worldwide the following year. Bird is currently used in corporate, educational, and personal settings.

== Technology ==
Bird is a device that is worn on the index finger and allows users to engage and interact with their digital content. The wearable device uses motion sensing technology to turn a TV or projected image into an interactive display – from up close like a touchscreen or remotely. Up to five Bird devices can be used on the same surface. The device operates through ten different sensors, including accelerometer, motion, and proximity sensors. Algorithms analyze the data including the wearer's position in space, pointing direction, hand posture, voice commands, and pressure levels from the sensors in real time. Bird's sensors accurately detect data up to 100 feet away from the interactive area.

Bird's various features allow the user to interact with the display in diverse ways. Remote touch is used to control content remotely like a remote mouse from up to 100 feet away. The device's touchpad allows the user to scroll up, down, left, and right. Bird's gesture control allows a user to control content using large hand gestures to make presentations more engaging. The touch feature turns any surface into a touchscreen. Bird can also be used as a smart controller for smart appliances including smart light bulbs and thermostats and as a control for drones using gestures.
