= Picnic Islands =

Islands in Florida, United States

Coordinates: 25°47′54.27″N 80°10′36.64″W

The Picnic Islands are a small group of islands within the city of Miami, Florida, United States. They are located just north of Biscayne Island in Biscayne Bay, just east offshore from the Edgewater and Upper Eastside districts of the city. The islands are uninhabited, but several of the group have beaches where boaters and picnickers frequent.

They are generally named for the mainland city parks that they are located next to in the bay. The southernmost one is Pace Picnic Island, located off Pace Park. There are also Morningside Picnic Islands Park and Legion Picnic Islands Park located directly off of Morningside Bayfront Park and Legion Park, respectively.
