= Birds, Texas =

- Ghost town
- Country: United States
- State: Texas
- County: Tarrant
- Time zone: UTC-6 (Central (CST))
  - Summer (DST): UTC-5 (CDT)
- GNIS feature ID: 2034617

Birds is a ghost town in Tarrant County, located in the U.S. state of Texas.
