= Markarian 273 =

Galaxy in the constellation of Ursa Major

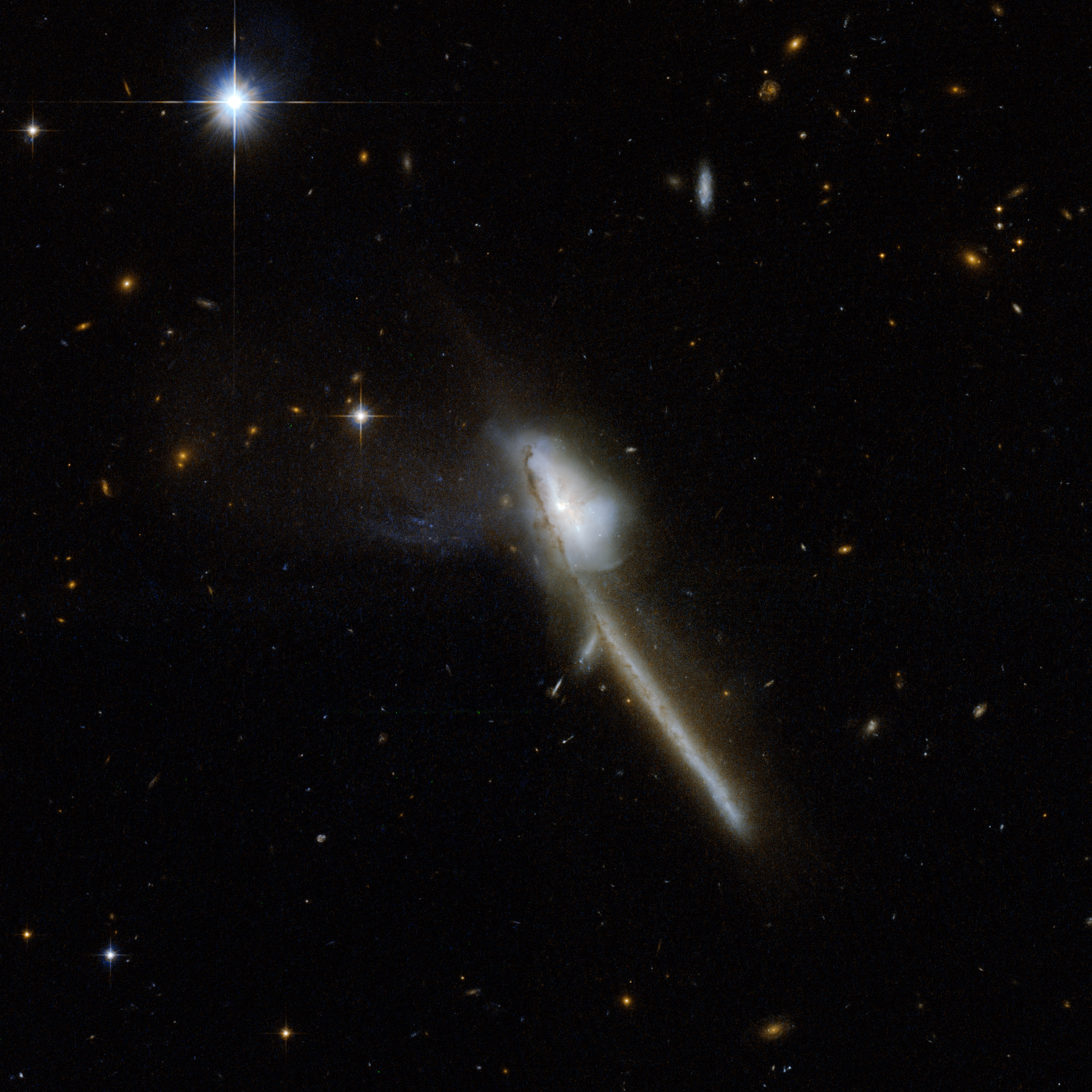
- Mrk 273 by the Hubble Space Telescope

Observation data (J2000 epoch)
- Constellation: Ursa Major
- Right ascension: 13^{h} 44^{m} 42.1^{s}
- Declination: +55° 53′ 13″
- Redshift: 0.037340 ± 0.000008
- Heliocentric radial velocity: 11,194 ± 2 km/s
- Distance: 502 Mly (154 Mpc)
- Apparent magnitude (V): 14.8

Characteristics
- Type: Pec
- Apparent size (V): 0.72′ × 0.40′
- Notable features: Ultraluminous infrared galaxy, Seyfert galaxy

Other designations
- UGC 8696, VV 851, I Zw 071, MCG +09-23-004, PGC 48711

Markarian 273 is a galaxy merger located in the constellation Ursa Major. It is located at a distance of about 500 million light years from Earth, which, given its apparent dimensions, means that Markarian 273 is about 130,000 light years across. It is an ultraluminous infrared galaxy and a Seyfert galaxy.

== Characteristics ==
Markarian 273 is a galaxy merger, the result of two or more galaxies colliding. When observed in mid infrared, two nuclei are visible, with a projected separation of about 0.75 kiloparsec. The southwest nucleus is known to be active, due its X-ray emission, while the northeast nucleus too displays a heavily absorbed X-ray spectrum, indicating that is also active. The optical emission of the southwest nucleus corresponds to a type II Seyfert galaxy while the north one of a LINER. A third component in the nuclear region is visible at the southeast in the radiowaves and could be a star cluster.

The galaxy experiences a starburst, with a star formation rate of 139 M_{☉} per year. This activity makes the galaxy shine bright in the infrared and it is categorised as ultra-luminous infrared galaxy, with total infrared luminosity of the galaxy is estimated to be 10^{12.1} L_{☉}. The startburst takes place in a rotating disk with a radius 120 pc and a total mass of 2.6×10^{9} M_{☉} which surrounds the north nucleus. It has been suggested that this is the location of compact luminous supernovae remnants and radio supernovae. The startburst is fed by large amounts of cold molecular gas. The gas has complex kinematics due to the presence of outflows. A kiloparsec scale outflow is visible towards the north in CO imaging, with the flow rate of 600 M_{☉} per year. The outflows reach about 5 kpc from the nucleus. There is also evidence of a bipolar superbubble.

The merger has a tidal tail extending southwards for 40 kiloparsecs, that is seen edge-on. Also south of the galaxy lies a giant X-ray nebula, measuring 40 by 40 kiloparsecs in size, that isn't closely related with the tidal tail. The gas temperature of the nebula is estimated to be 7 million K, possibly heated by galactic outflows. Filaments and clumps of ionised gas visible in OIII are extending about 23 kpc to the east. A warm gas ionised halo extends about 45 kpc from the nucleus, and is probably tidal debris from the merger. When observed in radiowaves the galaxy has two large plumes, one to the south, extending to about 100 kpc, and one dimmer to the north, extending to about 190 kpc.

== See also ==
- Arp 220 - the closest ultraluminous infrared galaxy to Earth
- NGC 6240 - galaxy merger and ultraluminous infrared galaxy
