= NGC 6786 =

Galaxy in the constellation Draco

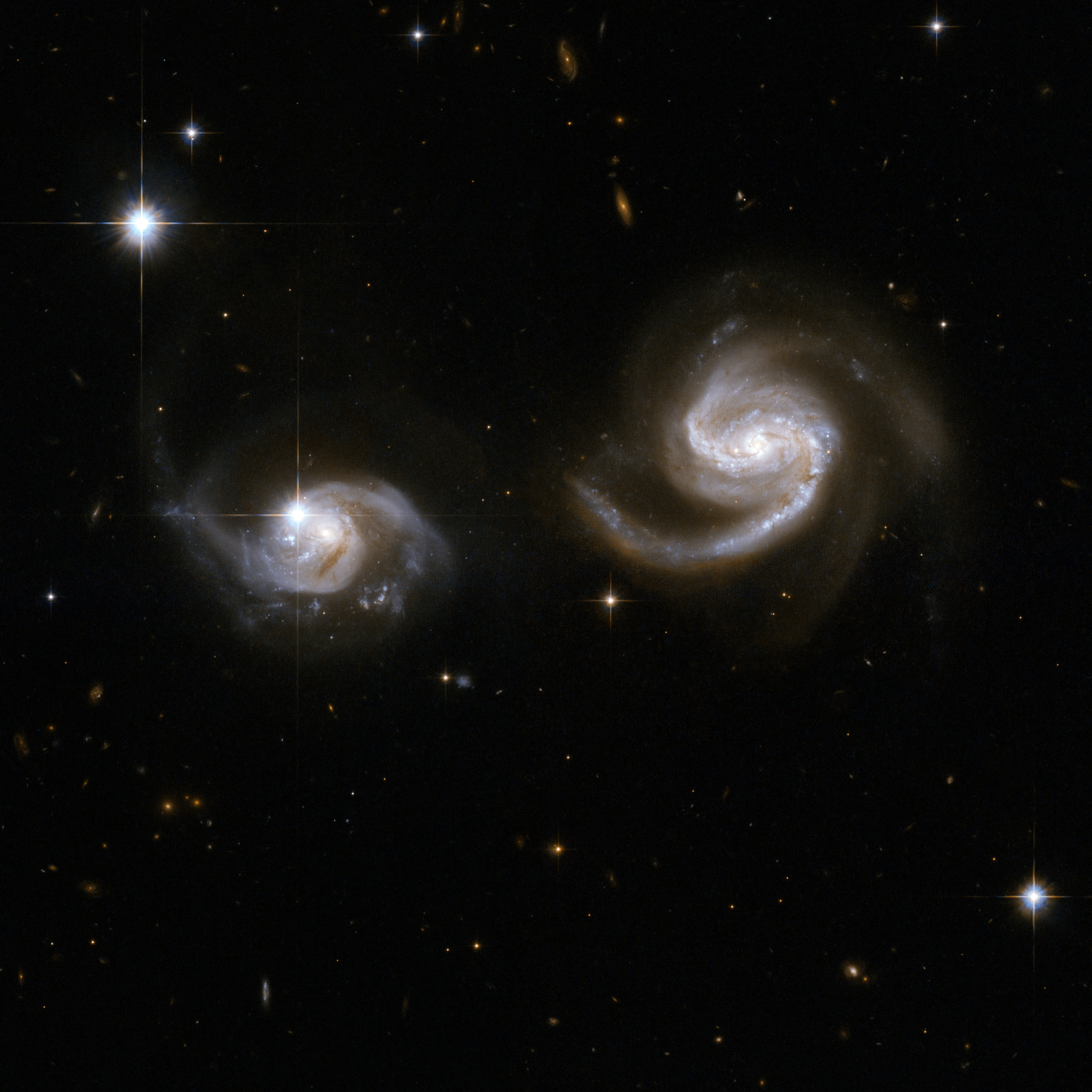
- NGC 6786 (right) and UGC 11415 (left) imaged by the Hubble Space Telescope

Observation data (J2000 epoch)
- Constellation: Draco
- Right ascension: 19^{h} 10^{m} 53.8692^{s}
- Declination: +73° 24′ 36.834″
- Redshift: 0.025244±0.000026
- Distance: 359.5 ± 25.2 Mly (110.22 ± 7.72 Mpc)
- Apparent magnitude (V): 12.80

Characteristics
- Type: SB?
- Size: ~131,000 ly (40.15 kpc) (estimated)
- Apparent size (V): 1.1′ × 0.9′

Other designations
- UGC 11414, PGC 62864, CGCG 341-019, VV 414W

NGC 6786 is an interacting spiral galaxy in the constellation of Draco. Its velocity with respect to the cosmic microwave background is 7,473±10 km/s, which corresponds to a Hubble distance of 359.5 ± 25.2 Mly (110.22 ± 7.72 Mpc). It was discovered by American astronomer Lewis Swift on 3 October 1886.

NGC 6786 is currently interacting with the neighboring galaxy known as UGC 11415, and, being the larger galaxy, it is likely that NGC 6786 will absorb UGC 11415 in the future. Both galaxies appear to be undergoing a starburst, a phenomenon commonly seen among interacting and merging galaxies.

One supernova has been observed in NGC 6786: SN 2004ed (Type IIn, mag. 17.4) was discovered by Tom Boles and Mark Armstrong on 2 September 2004.

== See also ==
- Interacting galaxies
- List of NGC objects (6001-7000)
