= Bird (Botero) =

Sculpture by Fernando Botero in Singapore

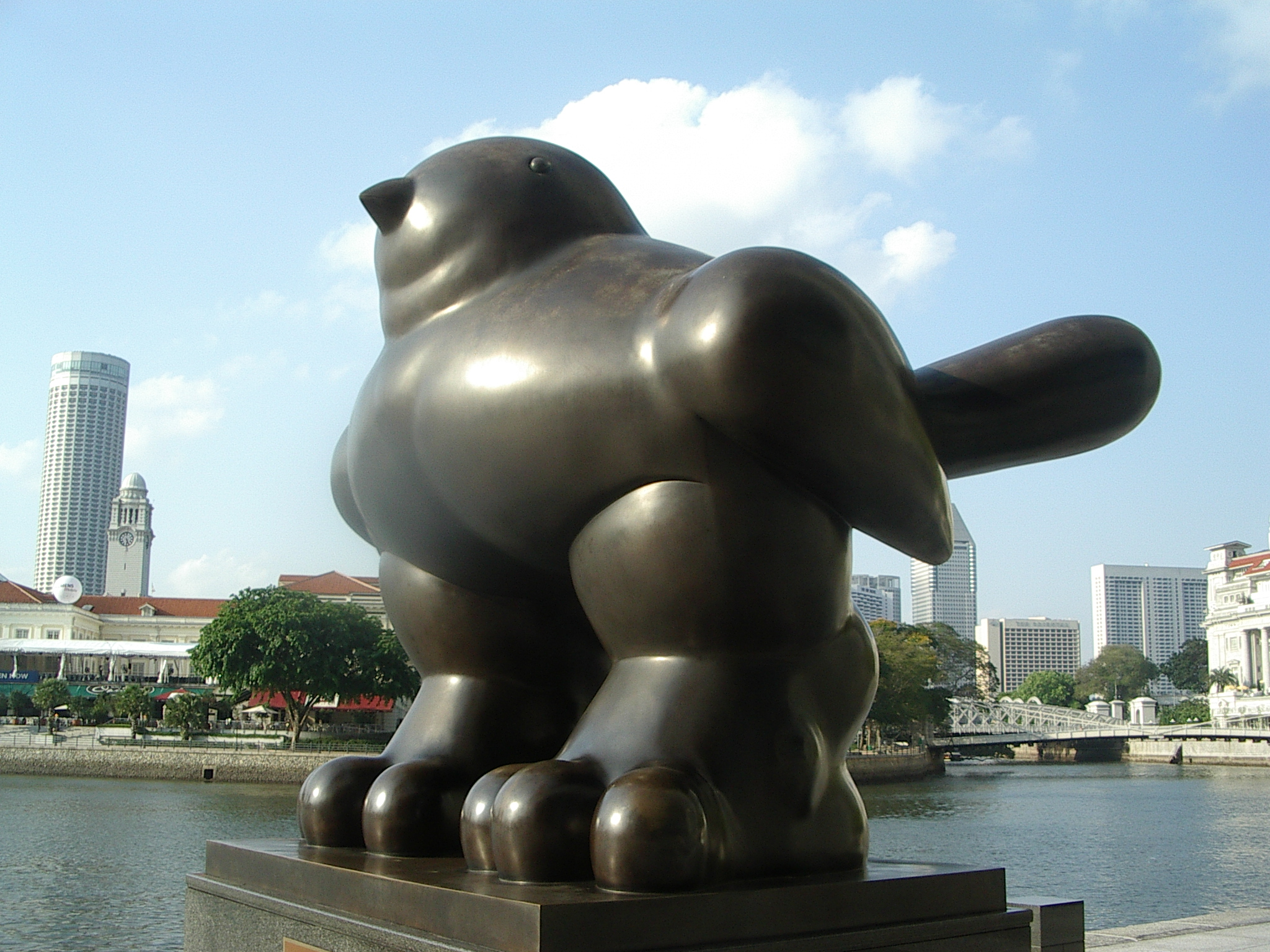
- The sculpture in 2004
- Artist: Fernando Botero
- Location: 1.28576°N 103.85127°E

Bird is a sculpture by Fernando Botero, installed in Singapore.
