= Big Bird (disambiguation) =

Big Bird is a character in Sesame Street.

Big Bird may also refer to:

== Songs ==
- A 1968 song by Eddie Floyd
- A 1983 song by The B-52s from the album Whammy!
- A 2011 song by Andrew Jackson Jihad from the album Knife Man

== People ==
- Larry Robinson, former hockey defenceman
- Mark Fidrych, nicknamed "The Bird" after Big Bird
- Joel Garner, West Indian cricketer, or his successor Curtly Ambrose

== Others ==
- A high-energy cosmic neutrino by IceCube Neutrino Observatory in 2013
- Tokyo International Airport Terminal 1 (commonly known as Haneda Airport), in Ota, Tokyo
- KH-9 "Hexagon", a spy satellite
- NokScoot (call sign: Big Bird), a Thailand-based airline
- Big Bird (finch), a species of Darwin's finches
- Operation Big Bird
- Suwon World Cup Stadium, in Suwon
