= Bird (mathematical artwork) =

Mathematical artwork

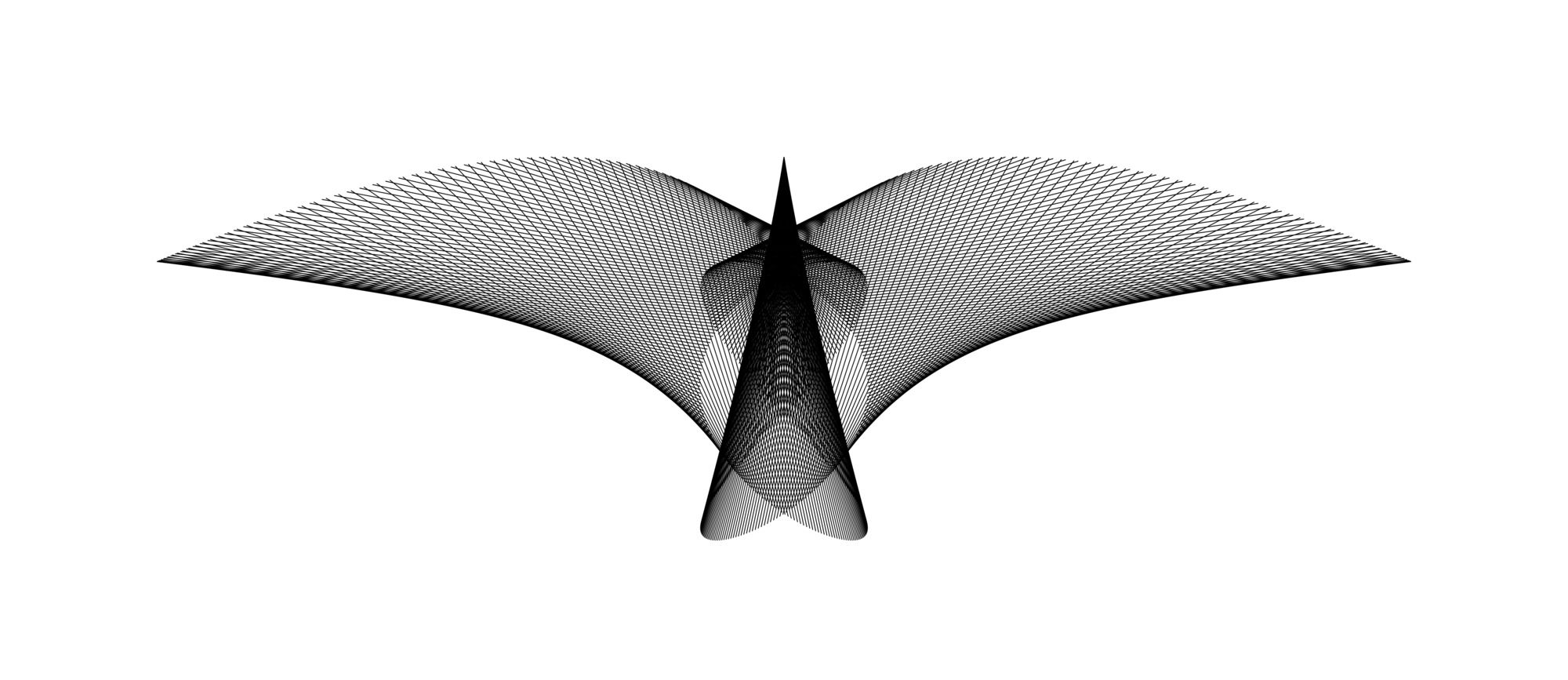
A version of A Bird in Flight by Hamid Naderi Yeganeh made up of 500 line segments

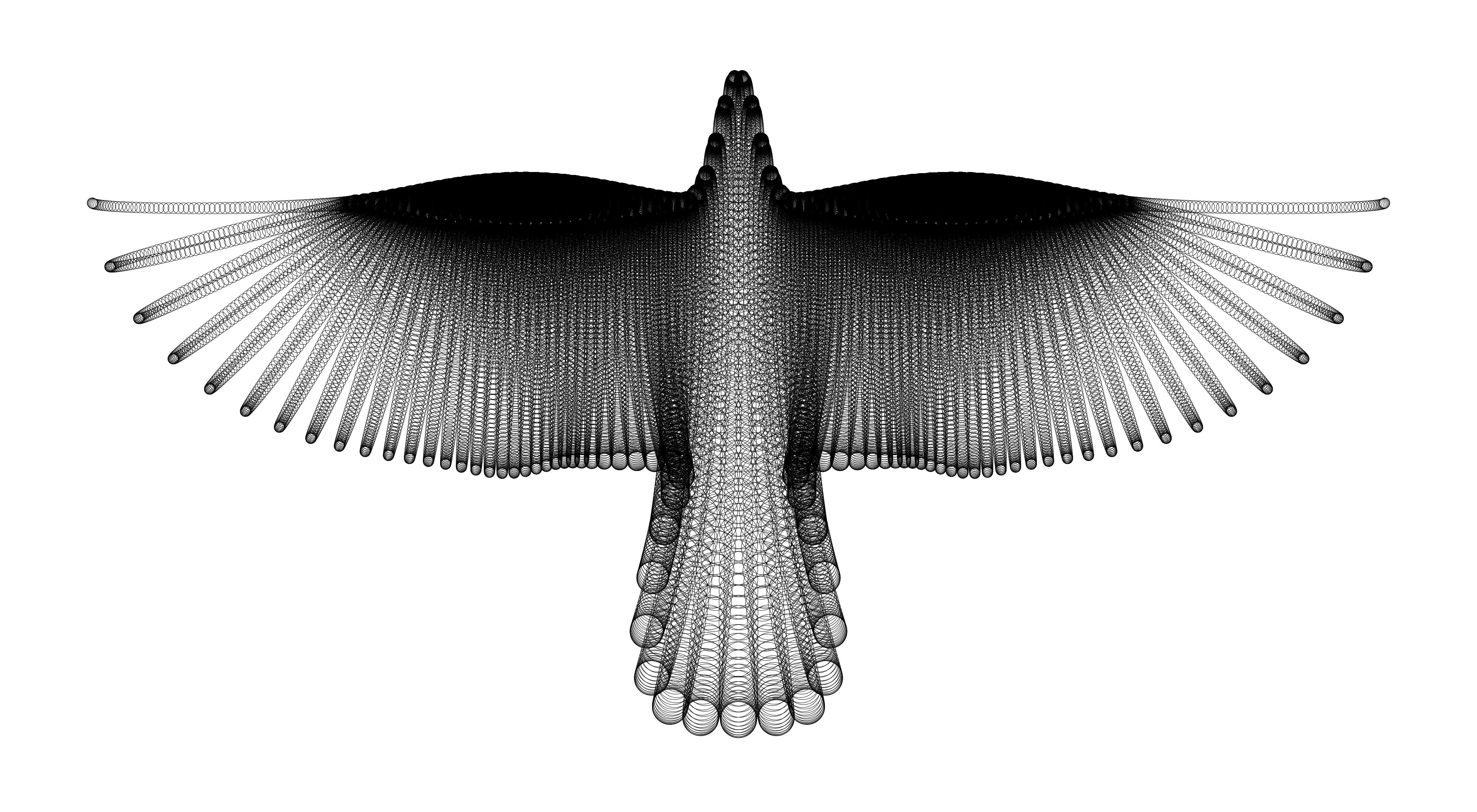
Another version of A Bird in Flight by Hamid Naderi Yeganeh made up of 20,001 circles

Bird, also known as A Bird in Flight refers to bird-like mathematical artworks that are introduced by mathematical equations. A group of these figures are created by combing through tens of thousands of computer-generated images. They are usually defined by trigonometric functions. An example of A Bird in Flight is made up of 500 segments defined in a Cartesian plane where for each $k=1, 2, 3, \ldots , 500$ the endpoints of the $k$-th line segment are:

$$\left(\frac{3}{2}\sin^7\left(\frac{2\pi k}{500}+\frac{\pi}{3}\right),\,\frac{1}{4}\cos^{2}\left(\frac{6\pi k}{500}\right)\right)$$

and

$$\left(\frac{1}{5}\sin\left(\frac{6\pi k}{500}+\frac{\pi}{5}\right),\,\frac{-2}{3}\sin^2\left(\frac{2\pi k}{500}-\frac{\pi}{3}\right)\right)$$.

The 500 line segments defined above together form a shape in the Cartesian plane that resembles a bird with open wings. Looking at the line segments on the wings of the bird causes an optical illusion and may trick the viewer into thinking that the segments are curved lines. Therefore, the shape can also be considered as an optical artwork. Another version of A Bird in Flight was defined as the union of all of the circles with center $\left(A(k), B(k)\right)$ and radius $R(k)$, where $k=-10000, -9999, \ldots , 9999, 10000$, and

$$A(k)=\frac{3k}{20000}+\sin\left(\frac{\pi }{2}\left(\frac{k}{10000}\right)^7\right)\cos^6\left(\frac{41\pi k}{10000}\right)+\frac{1}{4}\cos^{16}\left(\frac{41\pi k}{10000}\right)\cos^{12}\left(\frac{\pi k}{20000}\right)\sin\left(\frac{6\pi k}{10000}\right),$$
$$\begin{align} B(k)= & -\cos\left(\frac{\pi}{2}\left(\frac{k}{10000}\right)^7\right)\left(1+\frac{3}{2}\cos^6\left(\frac{\pi k}{20000}\right)\cos^6\left(\frac{3\pi k}{20000}\right)\right)\cos^6\left(\frac{41\pi k}{10000}\right) \\ & +\frac{1}{2}\cos^{10}\left(\frac{3\pi k}{100000}\right)\cos^{10}\left(\frac{9\pi k}{100000}\right)\cos^{10}\left(\frac{18\pi k}{100000}\right), \\ \end{align}$$
$$R(k)=\frac{1}{50}+\frac{1}{10}\sin^2\left(\frac{41\pi k}{10000}\right)\sin^2\left(\frac{9\pi k}{100000}\right)+\frac{1}{20}\cos^2\left(\frac{41\pi k}{10000}\right)\cos^{10}\left(\frac{\pi k}{20000}\right).$$

The set of the 20,001 circles defined above form a subset of the plane that resembles a flying bird. Although this version's equations are a lot more complicated than the version made of 500 segments, it has a better resemblance to a real flying bird.
