= NGC 454 =

Pair of interacting galaxies in the constellation Phoenix

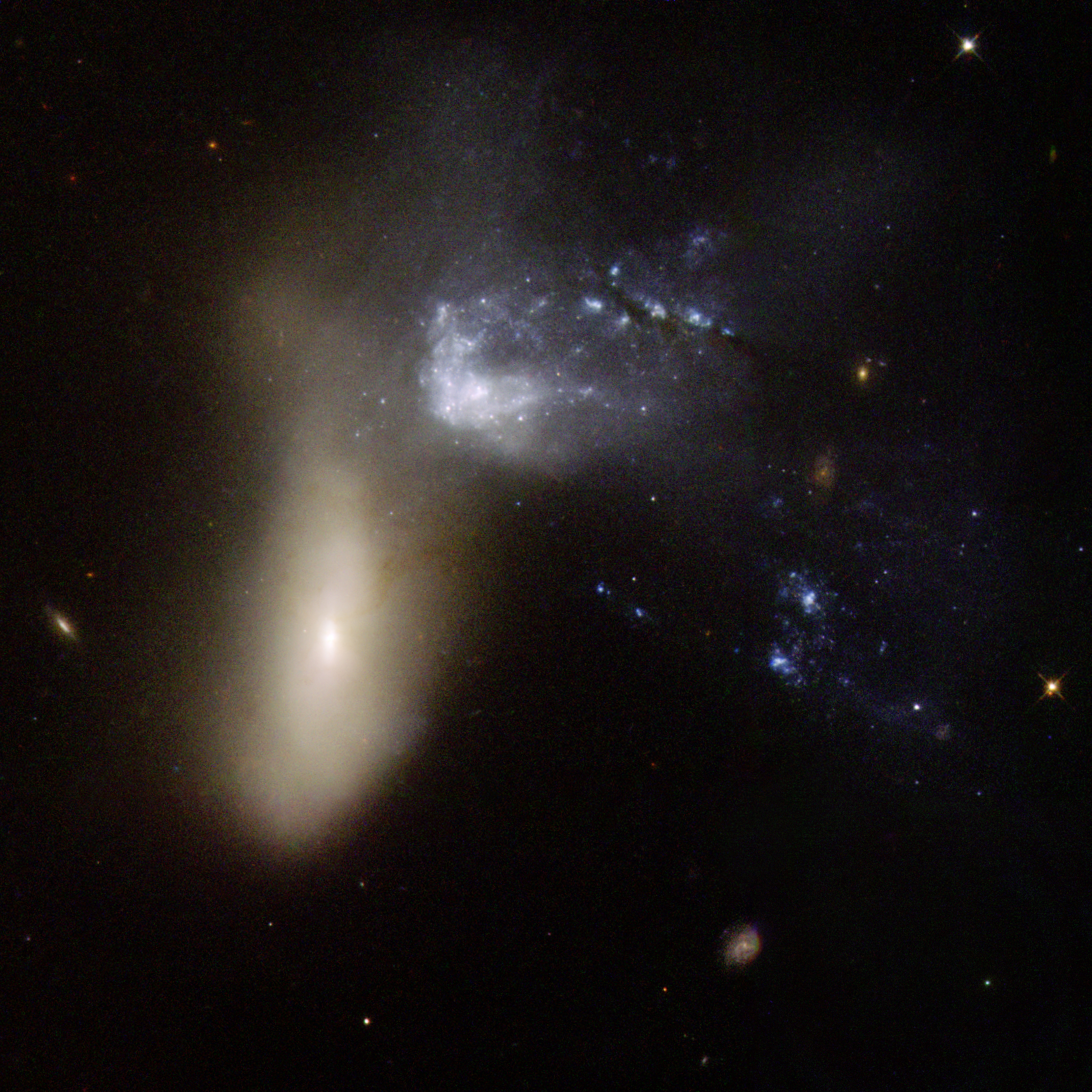
- NGC 454 as seen by the Hubble Space Telescope

Observation data (J2000 epoch)
- Constellation: Phoenix
- Right ascension: 01^{h} 14^{m} 22.5^{s}
- Declination: −55° 23′ 55″
- Redshift: 0.012158
- Heliocentric radial velocity: 3,645 km/s
- Apparent magnitude (V): 13.12
- Absolute magnitude (V): -20.31

Characteristics
- Type: Irr pec? (PGC 4461) and S0 pec? (PGC 4468)
- Apparent size (V): 1.8' × 1.8'

Other designations
- IRAS F01123-5539, PGC 4468

NGC 454 is a pair of interacting galaxies located 150 million light years away in the constellation Phoenix. John Herschel discovered it on October 5, 1834. It was described by Dreyer as "very faint, small, round, brighter middle." NGC 454 consists of a large elliptical galaxy that had been destroyed by the merging. And the pair also contains a bluish gas-rich irregular galaxy. The irregular galaxy may also have caused a trail of hot blue stars in the right of the image. The elliptical galaxy is on the left and the irregular galaxy is on the right. The trail is also located on the right.
