= NGC 4468 =

Galaxy in the constellation Coma Berenices

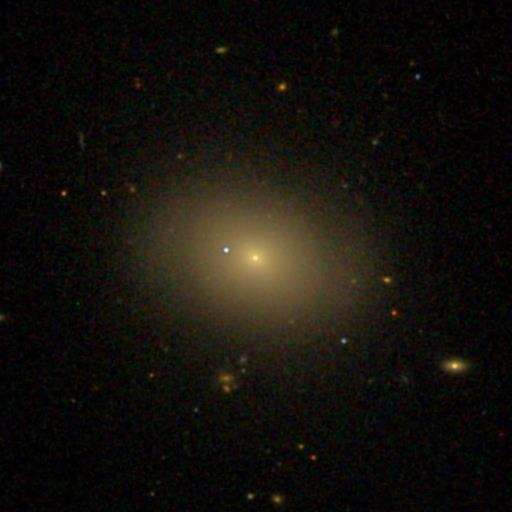
- SDSS image of NGC 4468.

Observation data (J2000 epoch)
- Constellation: Coma Berenices
- Right ascension: 12^{h} 29^{m} 30.9^{s}
- Declination: 14° 02′ 57″
- Redshift: 0.003032/909 km/s
- Distance: 55,100,000 ly
- Group or cluster: Virgo Cluster
- Apparent magnitude (V): 13.7

Characteristics
- Type: E, SA0-?
- Size: ~22,700 ly
- Apparent size (V): 1.45 x 0.96

Other designations
- PGC 41171, UGC 7628, VCC 1196

NGC 4468 is a dwarf elliptical galaxy located about 55 million light-years away in the constellation of Coma Berenices. The galaxy was discovered by astronomer William Herschel on January 14, 1787. It is a member of the Virgo Cluster.

== See also ==
- List of NGC objects (4001–5000)
