= ESO 593-8 =

Pair of interacting galaxies in Sagittarius

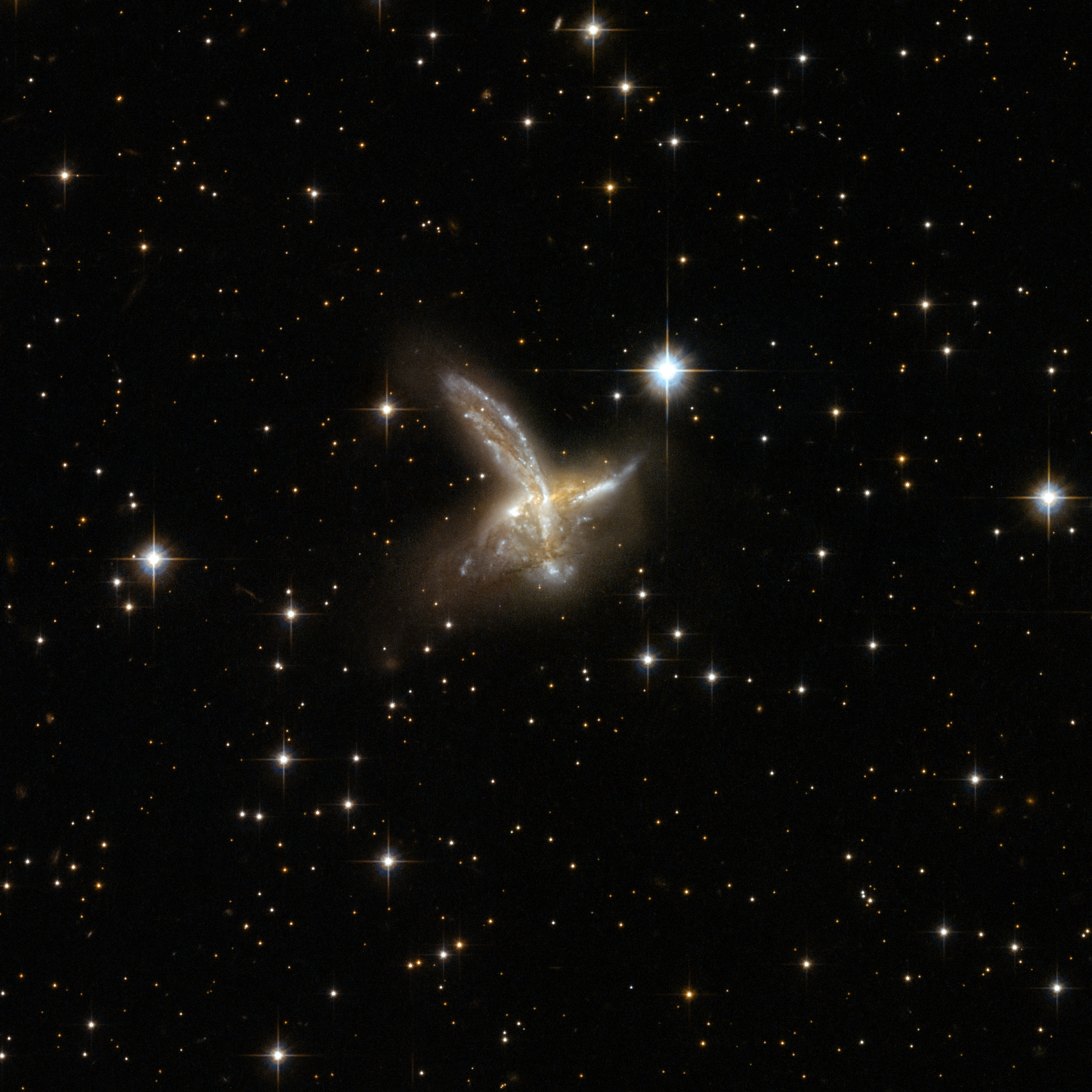
- HST image of ESO 593-8

Observation data (J2000 epoch)
- Constellation: Sagittarius
- Right ascension: 19^{h} 14^{m} 31.135^{s}
- Declination: −21° 19′ 09.00″
- Redshift: 0.048727
- Heliocentric radial velocity: 14252 km/s
- Distance: 650 Mly (200 Mpc)

Other designations
- The Bird, PGC 62946

ESO 593-8, which is known simply as 'The Bird' (also ESO 593-IG 008 or IRAS 19115–212), is group of interacting galaxies located in the constellation of Sagittarius, 650 million light-years away from Earth. It was created by a merger of two spiral galaxies and an irregular dwarf-galaxy. The resulting galaxy has a size similar to the Milky Way: around 100,000 light years. The galaxies were imaged by the Hubble Space Telescope and released in April 2008. The European Southern Observatory has also used the Very Large Telescope to resolve fine details of the galaxy with the use of adaptive optics.
