= J120011.1+680924.8 =

Elliptical galaxy located in the constellation Draco

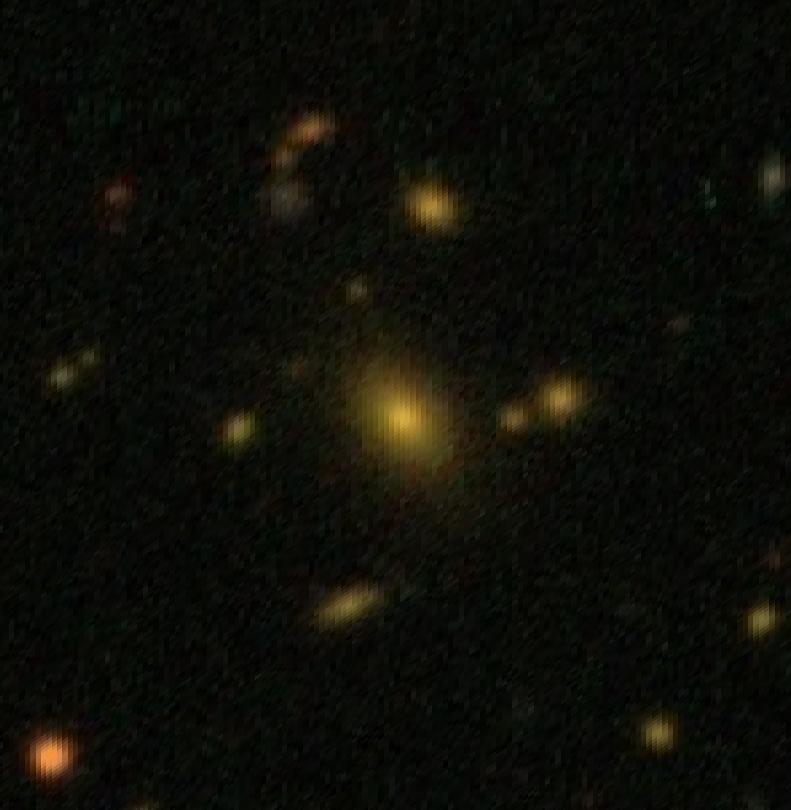
- SDSS image of J120011.1+680924.8

Observation data (J2000.0 epoch)
- Constellation: Draco
- Right ascension: 12^{h} 00^{m} 11.10^{s}
- Declination: +68° 09′ 24.80″
- Redshift: 0.262741
- Heliocentric radial velocity: 78,768 ± 13 km/s
- Distance: 3,795.2 ± 265.7 Mly (1,163.61 ± 81.45 Mpc)
- Group or cluster: [BVH2007] 136
- magnitude (J): 14.86

Characteristics
- Type: BrClG
- Size: ~681,000 ly (208.7 kpc) (estimated)

Other designations
- 2MASX J12001112+6809250, [BHF2008] 13, LEDA 2713000, GMBCG J180.04632+68.15690 BCG, OGC 103, SDSS J120011.11+680924.8, WHL J120011.1+680925 BCG

J120011.1+680924.8 also known as OGC 103 and SDSS J120011.11+680924.8, is a massive elliptical galaxy located in the constellation of Draco. The redshift of the galaxy is estimated to be (z) 0.262 and it is the brightest cluster galaxy of the galaxy cluster called [BVH2007] 136.

== Description ==
J120011.1+680924.8 is an elliptical galaxy with an R-band luminosity of 12.7 based on the luminosity estimation made by Sloan Digital Sky Survey (SDSS). It is one of the most massive galaxies known, with an R-band absolute magnitude of -24.07 and an R-band size of 1.18 kiloparsecs.

The galaxy is categorized as an intermediate early-type galaxy whose effective radius is approximately 4.69 parsecs based on a best Sersic fit technique. The dynamical mass of the galaxy is 12.22 M_{☉}. The stellar mass is 10.2 × 10^{11} M_{☉} with the galaxy itself being surrounded by a dark matter halo, with the dark matter component displaying a contribution of 6%. The total projected half-light radius is estimated to be 16.2 kiloparsecs based on a fit measurement to its de Vaucouleurs profile.

The galaxy has a rounded appearance and is located in the center of the cluster, with its inner profile best described by a shallow core, and has a calculated velocity dispersion of 383 kilometers per seconds. The de Vaucouleurs luminosity of the galaxy is estimated to be -24.47 magnitude, with a high ellipticity of 0.32. The bulge-to-total ratio is 0.72, while the bulge and disk radius is 10.35 and 13.44 kiloparsecs respectively based on an estimation of its de Vaucouleurs bulge plus an exponential disk model. Dust features are not present.
