= 2MASX J09194427+5622012 =

Elliptical galaxy in the constellation Ursa Major

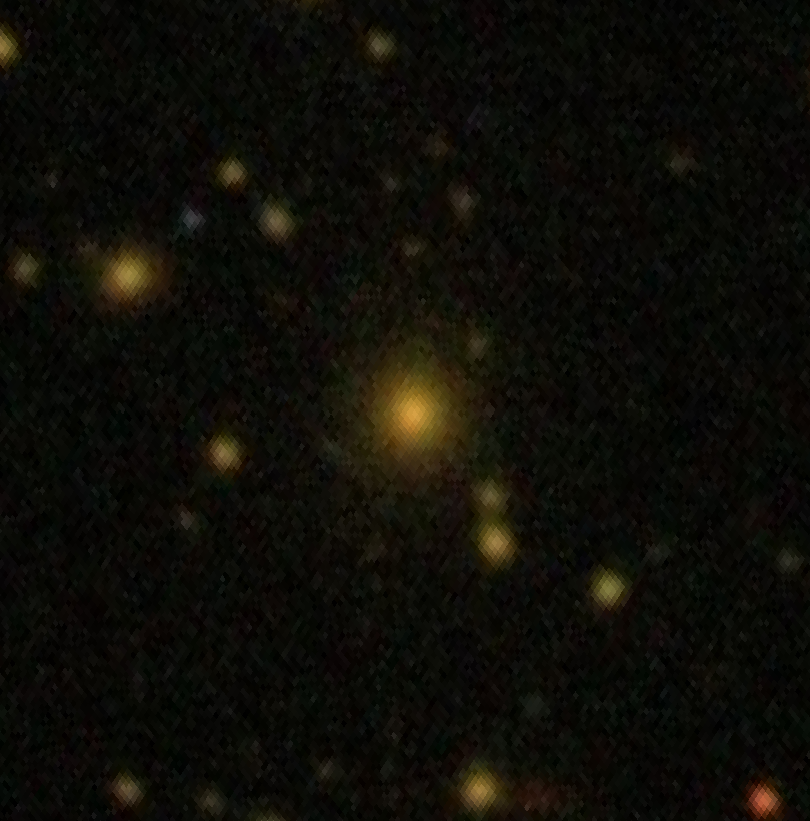
- SDSS image of 2MASX J09194427+5622012

Observation data (J2000.0 epoch)
- Constellation: Ursa Major
- Right ascension: 09^{h} 19^{m} 44.27^{s}
- Declination: +56° 22′ 01.31″
- Redshift: 0.277783
- Heliocentric radial velocity: 83,277 ± 15 km/s
- Distance: 4,013.9 ± 280.9 Mly (1,230.68 ± 86.13 Mpc)
- Group or cluster: WHL J091944.3+562201
- Magnitude (J): 14.94

Characteristics
- Type: BrClG
- Size: ~527,000 ly (161.5 kpc) (estimated)

Other designations
- [BHF2008] 05, OGC 0195, GALEXMSC J091944.40+562200.7, [LHC2018] J139.93443+56.36705, NVSS J091944+562200, SDSS J091944.27+562201.1, WHL J091944.3+562201 BCG, LEDA 3341782

2MASX J09194427+5622012 also known as OGC 195 and [BHF2008] 05, is a massive elliptical galaxy located in the constellation of Ursa Major. The redshift of the galaxy has been estimated to be (z) 0.277.

== Description ==
2MASX J09194427+5622012 is an elliptical galaxy of Type E residing as the brightest cluster galaxy of the WHL J091944.3+562201 galaxy cluster with 45 confirmed galaxy member candidates. The R-band magnitude of the galaxy is calculated to be 16.92 magnitude while the R-band absolute magnitude is found to be -23.96.

It is also an early-type galaxy with an effective radius of 4.97 parsecs based on a best fit Sérsic technique and has a total dynamical mass of 12.37 M_{☉}. The ellipticity of the galaxy is 0.198 ± 0.020. The velocity dispersion is 371 kilometers per seconds, with the galaxy's inner profile best described by its shallow core.

The total stellar mass of the galaxy has been estimated as 12.6 × 10^{11} M_{☉} and it is surrounded by a dark matter halo, whose dark matter component is shown to contribute at least 6%. The projected half-light radius is 16.9 kiloparsecs while its velocity dispersion is 356 kilometer per seconds. The de Vaucouleurs luminosity is -24.40 whereas the bulge and disk radius is calculated to be 16.90 and 22.23 kilometers respectively. There is no presence of any dust features.

A study published in 2016, has found the galaxy has a presence of a depleted core. Based on results, the core-Sersic break radius has a surface brightness of 18.04^{+0.06}_{−0.01} magnitude per square arcsecond while the break radius itself is estimated to be 0.55 kiloparsecs in total. The supermassive black hole located in the center of the galaxy is found to be 10.6^{+8.4}_{−8.1} × 10^{9} M_{☉}.
