= Sérsic =

Sérsic may refer to:

- José Luis Sérsic (1933–1993), Argentine astronomer
- Sérsic profile, a mathematical model of galaxy brightness
- 2691 Sérsic, an asteroid
