= Antoinette de Vaucouleurs =

French American astronomer

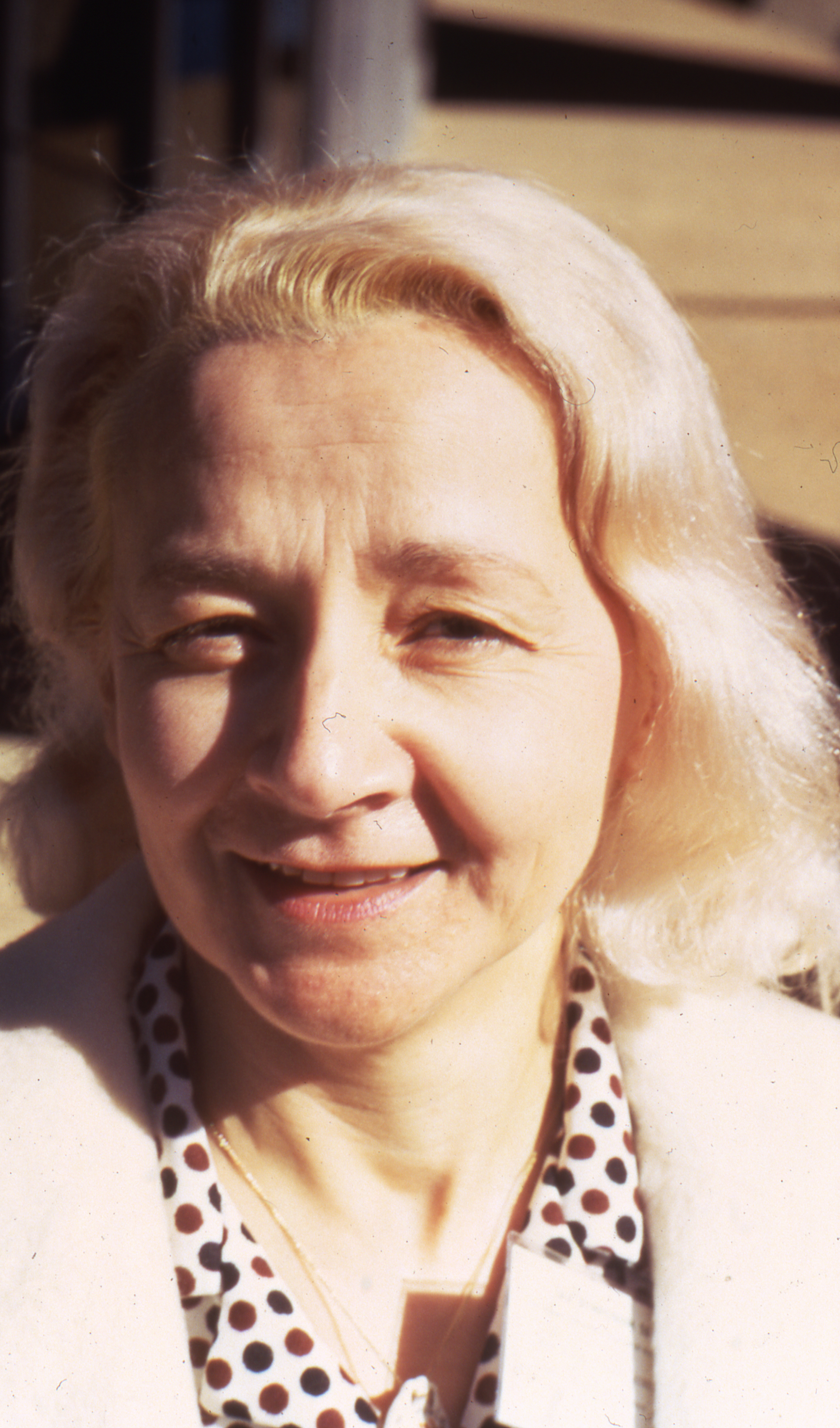
- de Vaucouleurs in 1973
- Born: Antoinette Piétra; November 14, 1921; Paris, France
- Died: August 27, 1987 (aged 65)
- Education: Sorbonne
- Scientific career
- Fields: Astronomy
- Workplaces: University of Texas at Austin

Antoinette de Vaucouleurs (French pronunciation: [ɑ̃twanɛt də vokulœʁ]; November 14, 1921, Paris, France-August 29, 1987, Austin, Texas, USA) was an astronomer who worked in the Astronomy Department of the University of Texas at Austin for 25 years (1961–1986) when few women worked in the field. In addition to ongoing collaborations with her husband, Gérard de Vaucouleurs, she carried out her own research in spectroscopy. Her contributions (and Gérard's) were recognized in a festschrift in 1988, entitled The World of Galaxies.

== Early life and education ==
Antoinette Piétra was born on November 14, 1921, in Paris, France. She married Gérard de Vaucouleurs on October 31, 1944.

De Vaucouleurs studied mathematics, physics, and astronomy at the Sorbonne from 1944 to 1948.

== Career ==
De Vaucouleurs worked as a laboratory spectroscopist at the Institut d'Astrophysique de Paris from 1948 to 1949.

From 1950 to 1951, she acted as a voluntary assistant at the University of London Observatory (ULO)'s Mill Hill Observatory. There she measured spectra from the 24-inch Wilson reflector, a gift to the observatory from J. G. Wilson in 1925.

De Vaucouleurs moved to Canberra, Australia in 1951, where she worked as an assistant to Richard Woolley, director of the Commonwealth Observatory at Mount Stromlo. During this time, she worked on the spectrophotometry of southern bright stars and of the planet Mars.

In 1957, the de Vaucouleurs were invited to Lowell Observatory in Flagstaff, Arizona. In 1958 they moved to the Harvard Observatory in Cambridge, Massachusetts, where they remained from 1958 to 1960.

In 1960, the de Vaucouleurs moved to the University of Texas at Austin which was forming a Department of Astronomy. There de Vaucouleurs held an official position as a Research Scientist Associate from 1961 to 1986 and was able to work with the McDonald Observatory. She also served on the Chancellor's Council of the University of Texas from 1980 onwards.

In 1962, de Vaucouleurs became a naturalized American citizen.

== Research ==
During her time in Paris, de Vaucouleurs discovered new spectroscopic doublets and perturbations in the secondary series of the infrared spectrum of potassium. She and Gérard used the Chalonge microphotometer to study the surface photometry of galaxies, leading to the formulation of "De Vaucouleurs's law" for the surface brightness of an elliptical galaxy in 1948.

In Australia, de Vaucouleurs worked first on Greenwich-style spectrophotometric gradients in the continua of southern bright stars and of the planet Mars. She and Gérard were the first to take Harold Johnson's UBV photometric system for classifying stars according to their color and magnitude, and adapt it to the photoelectric-photometry of galaxies. She later published a photometry catalogue of galaxies with Giuseppe Longo (1983).

In 1957, De Vaucouleurs submitted her work on Spectral Types and Luminosities of B, A and F Southern Stars to the Royal Astronomical Society in London. It was the first quantitative spectral and luminosity classification of the 366 stars of the Morgan-Keenan system. It was considered one of the best classifications for MK types of southern stars.

De Vaucouleurs reportedly noticed variability in the centers of some Seyfert galaxies in 1958, but was discouraged from following up on the idea by her husband. Her suspicions were later confirmed by the discoveries of others.

De Vaucouleurs was an active participant in her husband's extragalactic research. Between 1960 and 1978 she helped with the radial velocity surveys done at the McDonald Observatory using the 82 inches (2.1 m) Struve reflector. She took over much of the tedious and painstaking work of reducing the data from the observation runs.

De Vaucouleurs was a partner in her husband's early studies of the dimensions and structure of the Large Magellanic Cloud, including the first quantitative analysis of the spectral composition of a galaxy from its spectrum. They used the strength of its absorption lines to determine the stellar population of the bar of the Large Magellanic Cloud.

For fifteen years, Antoinette and Gerard de Vaucouleurs compiled and systematized the Reference Catalogue of Bright Galaxies (RCBG), one of the major catalogues of galaxies to be published after 1960. It built upon the work of Harlow Shapley and Adelaide Ames in the Shapley-Ames Catalogue of Bright Galaxies and of others. The first Reference Catalogue was published in 1964. It contained 2,599 objects, double the size of the original Shapley-Ames catalogue. The Second Reference Catalogue of Bright Galaxies (RC2), published by the de Vaucouleurs and Harold G. Corwin, Jr. in 1976, included 4,364 objects and considerably expanded the data provided about them. The Third Reference Catalogue of Bright Galaxies (RC3) included 23,022 objects, from a database of 73,197 galaxies at Lyons Observatory. In addition, the Southern Galaxy Catalogue (1985) was completed by Harold Corwin with lesser levels of help from Antoinette and Gérard de Vaucouleurs. Throughout this work, de Vaucouleurs was well known for her attention to and memory for detail and her ability to discover and correct errors.

The de Vaucouleurs are also known for their pioneering work on superclusters. In 1953, on the basis of their joint work, Gerard put forth the controversial claim that the Milky Way was in fact part of a larger flattened system of galaxies since known as the Local Supercluster, They developed a supergalactic coordinate system based on the orientation of the Local Superclustor and other clusters, which has been used extensively to describe the distribution of nearby galaxies. De Vaucouleurs was active in studying galaxy redshift movement.

De Vaucouleurs died of bone marrow cancer on August 29, 1987. She continued to work until 10 weeks before her death.

== Recognition ==
The University of Texas at Austin established the Antoinette de Vaucouleurs Memorial Lectureship and Medal to be awarded annually to "an outstanding astronomer in recognition of a lifetime of dedication to astronomy".

== Publications ==
- de Vaucouleurs, Gérard; de Vaucouleurs, Antoinette (1964). Reference catalogue of bright galaxies being the Harvard survey of galaxies brighter than the 13th magnitude of H. Shapley and A. Ames, revised, corrected and enlarged, with notes, bibliography and appendices. Austin, Texas: University of Texas Press.
- de Vaucouleurs, Gérard; de Vaucouleurs, Antoinette; Corwin, Harold G. Jr. (1976). Second reference catalogue of bright galaxies, containing information on 4,364 galaxies with references to papers published between 1964 and 1975. Austin: University of Texas Press. ISBN 978-0-292-75507-9.
- de Vaucouleurs, Gérard; de Vaucouleurs, Antoinette; Corwin, Harold G. Jr.; Buta, Ronald J.; Paturel, Georges; Fouque, Pascal (1991). Third reference catalogue of bright galaxies. New York: Springer-Verlag. ISBN 978-0-387-97549-8.
- Longo, Giuseppe; de Vaucouleurs, Antoinette; Corwin, Harold G. Jr. (1983). General catalogue of photoelectric magnitudes and colors in the U, B, V system of 3,578 galaxies brighter than the 16-th V-magnitude (1936-1982). Austin: Dept. of Astronomy, University of Texas at Austin. ISBN 978-0-9603796-2-0.
- Corwin, Harold G.; de Vaucouleurs, Antoinette; de Vaucouleurs, Gérard (1985). Southern galaxy catalogue: a catalogue of 5481 galaxies south of declination -17 degrees found on 1.2-m U.K. Schmidt IIIa-J plates. Austin: Dept. of Astronomy, University of Texas at Austin. ISBN 978-0-9603796-3-7.
