= J10405643–0103584 =

Galaxy in the constellation Sextans

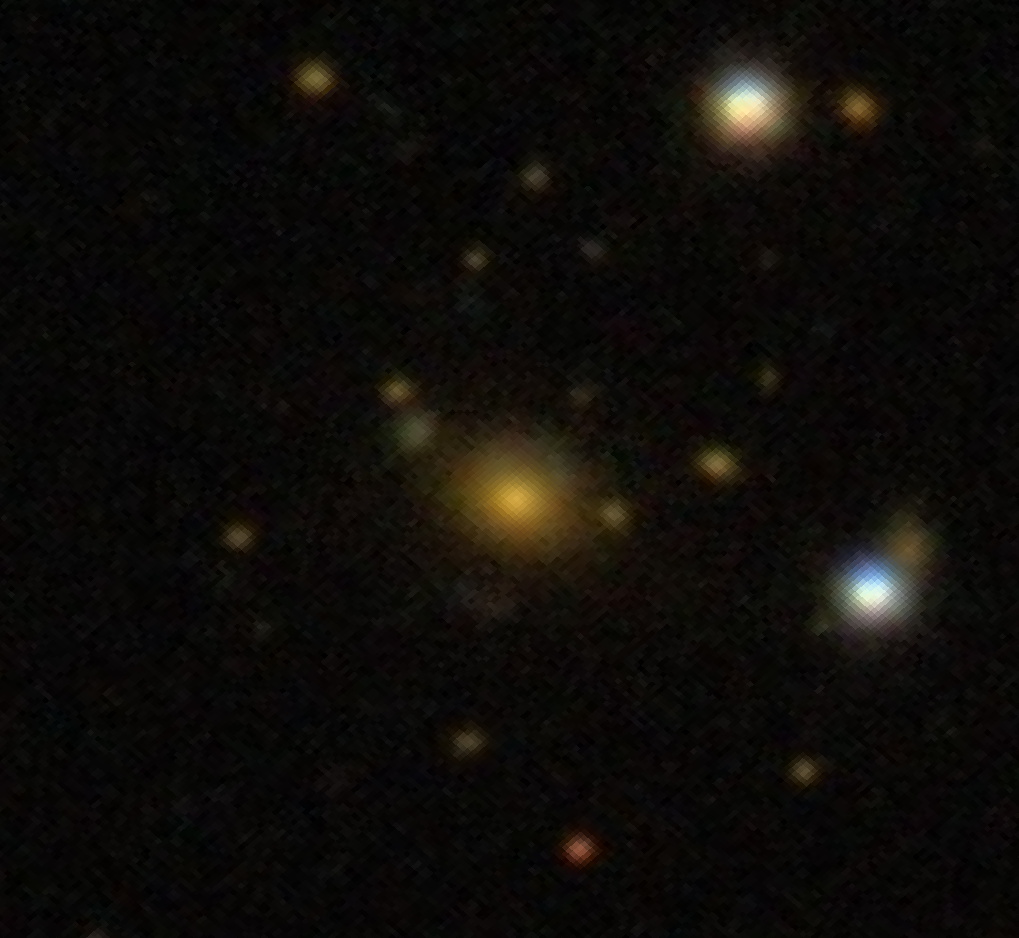
- SDSS image of J10405643–0103584

Observation data (J2000.0 epoch)
- Constellation: Sextans
- Right ascension: 10^{h} 40^{m} 56.42^{s}
- Declination: −01° 03′ 58.65″
- Redshift: 0.250242
- Heliocentric radial velocity: 75,021 ± 10 km/s
- Distance: 3,622.5 ± 253.6 Mly (1,110.67 ± 77.75 Mpc)
- Group or cluster: SDSS CE J160.241898–01.069106
- magnitude (J): 14.66

Characteristics
- Type: BrCIG
- Size: ~656,800 ly (201.39 kpc) (estimated)

Other designations
- 2dFGRS N294Z024, 2MASX J10405643–0103584, [BHF2008] 23, LEDA 1127620, OGC 0073, SDSS J104056.42–010358.7, WHL J104056.4–010358 BCG

J10405643–0103584 also known as 2MASX J10405643–0103584 is a massive lenticular galaxy in the constellation of Sextans. The redshift of the galaxy has been estimated as (z) 0.25 and it is the brightest cluster galaxy (BCG) in the center of a low-mass galaxy cluster called SDSS CE J160.241898–01.069106.

== Description ==
The galaxy is described as one of the most massive galaxies known, with a measured absolute R-band magnitude of -24.27 and an R-band size that is approximately 1.30 kiloparsecs. It is classified as a supermassive early-type elliptical galaxy whose inner profile is best described by a shallow core, with a velocity dispersion calculated as 424 kilometers per second. The total bulge and disk radius has been estimated as 29.34 and 18.75 kiloparsecs respectively based on its de Vaucouleurs bulge and exponential disk model. The disk of the galaxy itself has an inclination of 2° at a position angle of 74° and a measured disk exponential scale length of 12.43.

The galaxy has a symmetric morphology. Several satellite galaxies of low masses surround it, and it is also bulge-dominated, with a bulge fraction ratio roughly estimated as B/T = 0.66, making this the highest known when studied, suggesting it transitioned into a lenticular galaxy from an elliptical galaxy when its galactic disk was reformed via galaxy mergers. The total star formation is estimated to be 9.3 M_{☉} per year with a total stellar mass of 4.7 × 10^{11} M_{☉} based on a study published in 2018. It is offset by 15.5 kiloparsecs from the X-ray peak of the cluster.
