= Abell 2280 BCG =

Type-cD galaxy in the constellation of Draco

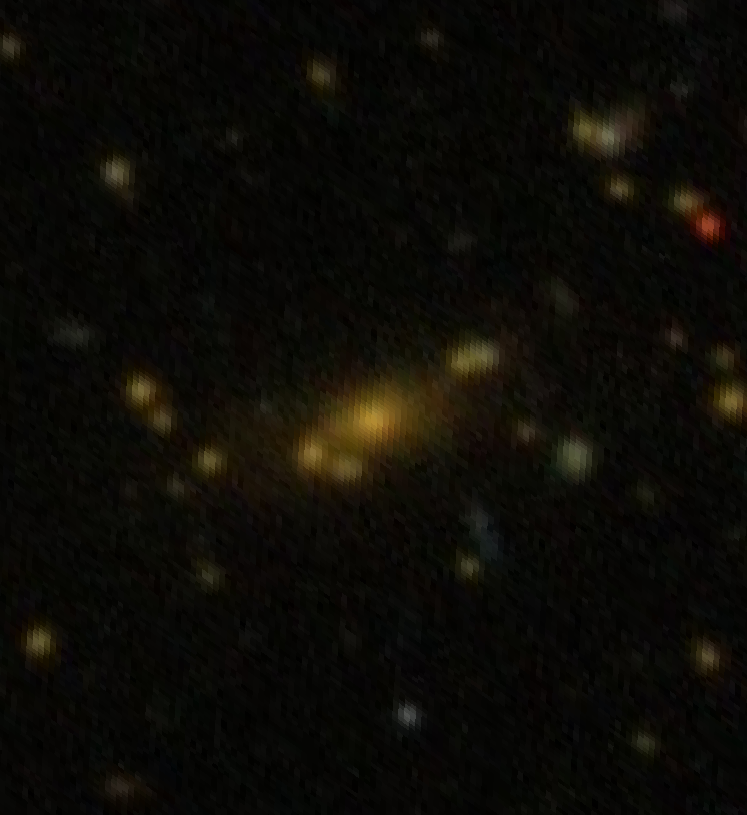
- SDSS image of Abell 2280 BCG

Observation data (J2000.0 epoch)
- Constellation: Draco
- Right ascension: 17^{h} 43^{m} 30.46^{s}
- Declination: +63° 41′ 41.34″
- Redshift: 0.331000
- Heliocentric radial velocity: 99,231 ± 300 km/s
- Distance: 4,770.6 ± 334.6 Mly (1,462.66 ± 102.58 Mpc)
- Group or cluster: Abell 2280
- Magnitude (J): 15.61

Characteristics
- Type: cD
- Size: ~507,000 ly (155.4 kpc) (estimated)

Other designations
- 2MASX J17433050+6341412, NEP 2420:[BGF2006] A, SDSS J174330.38+634141.6, WISEA J174330.46+634141.3, 1RXS J174328.1+634140, LEDA 2659751

Abell 2280 BCG (Short for Abell 2280 Brightest Cluster Galaxy) is a massive Type-cD elliptical galaxy located in the constellation of Draco. The redshift of the galaxy is (z) 0.331 and such is found to dominate the center of a luminous galaxy cluster Abell 2280 which is also known as WHL J174330.4+634142 with 41 cluster member galaxies.

== Description ==
Abell 2280 BCG is categorized as a central dominant galaxy of Abell 2280. It is found to have a galactic halo with several companions embedded within it. There is a presence of a gravitational lens arc feature that is located by 14 arcseconds in northwest direction from the BCG's central region with further evidence that the arc's curvature radius is also coincident within the BCG's position. The arc has an R-band magnitude of 22.9 ± 0.2 while the surface brightness is measured to be 25.0 arcseconds per magnitude square. This arc has also has a radial half-light thickness of less than 0.45 arcseconds and has a length of 7.9 arcseconds. The X-ray emission peak is associated with the BCG within an area of 15 arcseconds.

The R-band absolute magnitude of the BCG is estimated to be -24.23 while the ellipticity is 0.38. The position angle of the BCG has been calculated to be 114.7°. The total R-band magnitude is found to be 17.16.

A study published in 2006 has found the BCG is a radio galaxy containing a radio source called NEP 2420 A. Based on studies, the source is found to be a triple with a straight appearance and has a linear size that is measured to be 116.8 kiloparsecs in extent. There is a presence of a central component, interpreted as a radio core with radio lobes that are shown to be orientated in perpendicular direction of the radio source's axis. The central component has a flux density of 0.31 mJy while the eastern and western components have flux densities of 2.72 and 3.39 mJy respectively.
