= Abell 521 BCG =

Galaxy in the constellation Eridanus

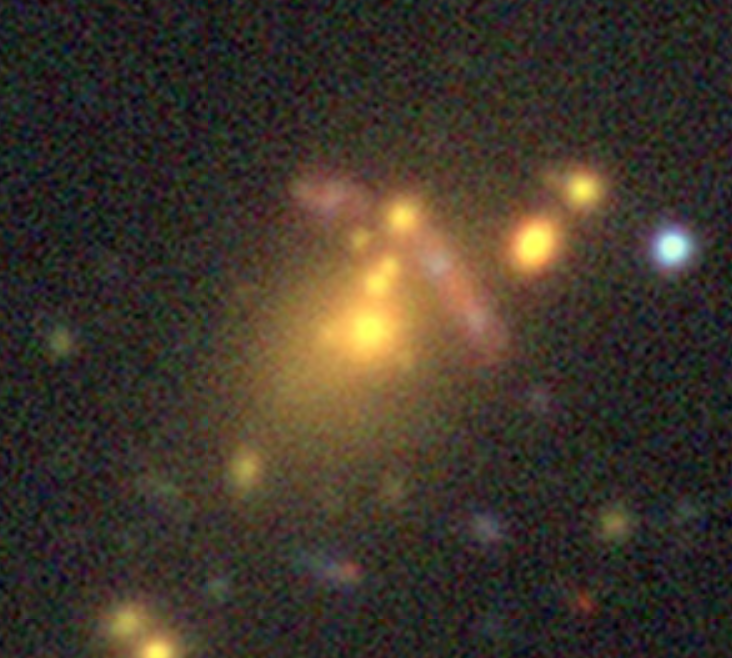
- DESI Legacy Surveys image of Abell 521 BCG

Observation data (J2000.0 epoch)
- Constellation: Eridanus
- Right ascension: 04^{h} 54^{m} 06.92^{s}
- Declination: −10° 13′ 24.57″
- Redshift: 0.248085
- Heliocentric radial velocity: 74,374 ± 47 km/s
- Distance: 3,562.8 ± 249.4 Mly (1,092.36 ± 76.47 Mpc)
- Group or cluster: Abell 521
- Magnitude (J): 14.89

Characteristics
- Type: Early-Type
- Size: ~560,000 ly (171.6 kpc) (estimated)

Other designations
- 2MASX J04540687−1013247, ABELL 0521:[BHB2008] BCG, LEDA 980855, ABELL 0521:[FMC2003] 065, GMRT J0454-1013b

Abell 521 BCG (Short for Abell 521 Brightest Cluster Galaxy) is a massive elliptical galaxy residing as the brightest cluster galaxy (BCG) of a young rich merging Bautz-Morgan Class type III galaxy cluster called Abell 521. The redshift of the galaxy is (z) 0.248 and it is located in the constellation of Eridanus.

== Description ==
Abell 521 BCG is an early-type galaxy containing an unresolved radio source with a radio flux density of 0.47 mJy at 610 MHz frequencies and a radio power of 22.92 W Hz^{−1}. It has presence of multiple nuclei that is made up of a secondary nucleus and three others depicted as small and faint inside the inner regions. One of the nuclei is shown having a measured peculiar motion of -413 ± 57 kilometer per seconds, with further evidence of it having distorted isophote, indicating an interaction. The multiple nuclei are suggested to be remains of galaxies that have merged with the BCG though galactic cannibalism.

There are also bright extended knot features that is superposed on an arc-like structure of the BCG. Three of these knots are gravitationally bounded to the BCG and have a measured mass of 7.97 × 10^{10} M_{☉}. The arc-like structure is measured to have a curvature of approximately 7.5 arcseconds and is centered nearly on the BCG's position. The total length of the BCG is found to be extend more than 20 × 30 arcseconds with the total surface brightness between 22 and 27 arcsec^{−2} based on a de Vaucouleurs profile. The total stellar mass of the BCG has been estimated as 0.55 × 10^{12} M_{☉}.

The core of the BCG is found to have a red appearance based on the inner color profile shape. The BCG is also found to have an offset peak of 32.8 kiloparsecs from the cluster and also located in the X-ray northern group region. Four blob features are also found inside the arc-like structure within 24 kiloparsecs of the BCG's center. The BCG has absence of both hydrogen-alpha emission and optical emission lines.
