= NGC 1266 =

Galaxy in the constellation Eridanus

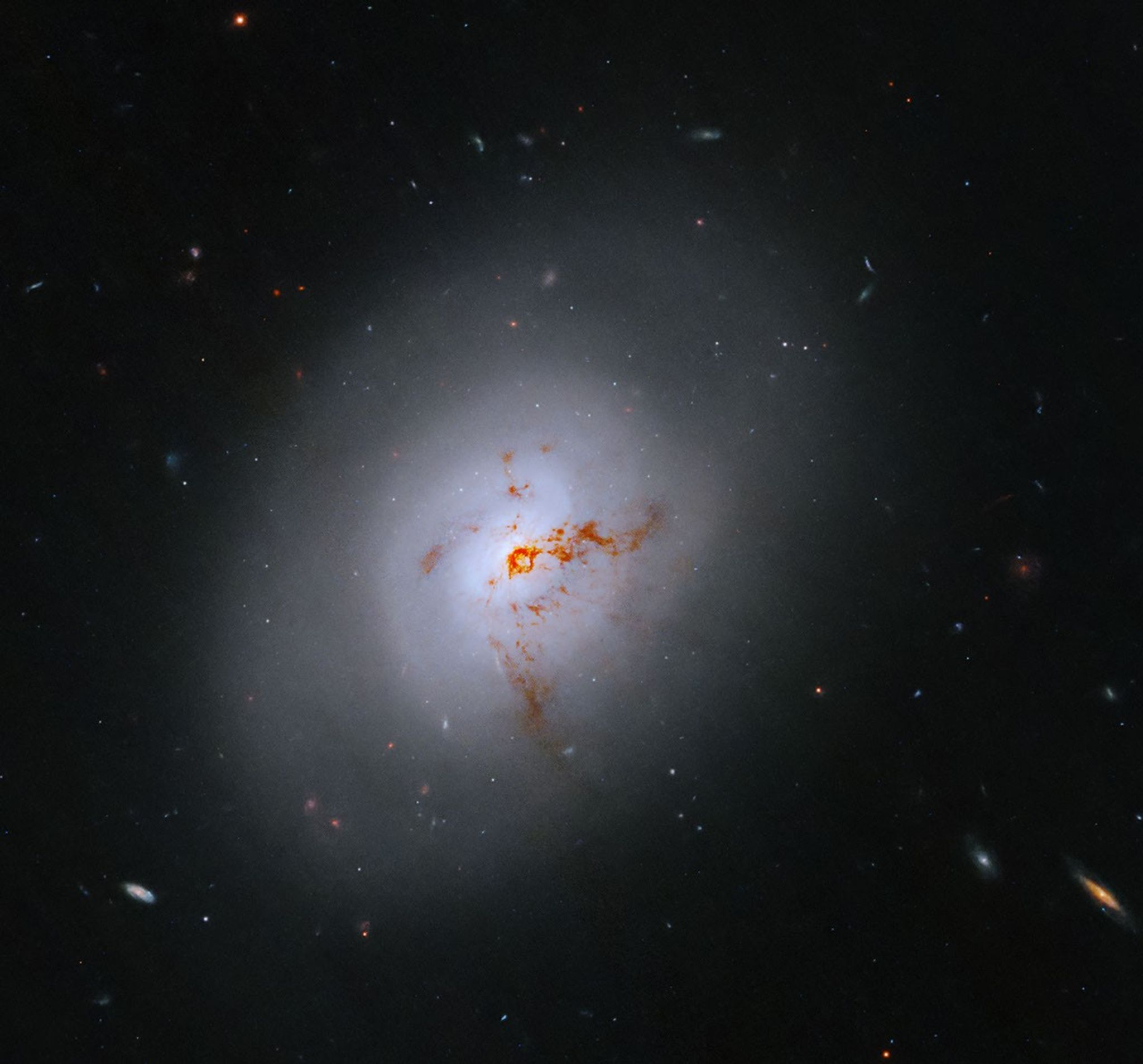
- NGC 1266 imaged by Hubble Space Telescope

Observation data (J2000 epoch)
- Constellation: Eridanus
- Right ascension: 03^{h} 16^{m} 00.7^{s}
- Declination: −02° 25′ 38″
- Redshift: 0.007238 ± 0.000017
- Heliocentric radial velocity: 2170 ± 5 km s^{−1}
- Distance: 29.9 Mpc

Characteristics
- Type: S0
- Half-light radius (physical): 2.96 kpc
- Half-light radius (apparent): 20.4"
- Notable features: AGN, molecular outflow, suppressed SFR

Other designations
- PGC 12131

NGC 1266 is a lenticular galaxy in the constellation Eridanus. Although not currently starbursting, it has undergone a period of intense star formation in the recent past, ceasing only ≈500 Myr ago. The galaxy is host to an obscured active galactic nucleus.

A massive molecular outflow, with 2.4 × 10^{7} M$_{\odot}$ of hydrogen, is present from the nucleus of the galaxy, at a rate of 110 M$_{\odot}$ yr^{−1}. Less than 2% of the gas (2 M$_{\odot}$ yr^{−1}) is escaping the galaxy. Momentum coupling to the jet of the AGN is likely driving the outflow.

The current observed star-formation rate (SFR) of ~0.87 M$_{\odot}$ yr^{−1} is significantly lower than expected for a galaxy of its properties, suppressed by a factor of 50 to 150. Authors have put forth several hypotheses to explain these observations. The most likely scenario is that the AGN-driven molecular outflow is injecting turbulence into the nuclear regions, preventing gravitational collapse of molecular clouds. NGC 1266 is the first known intermediate-mass galaxy to show AGN-driven suppression of star formation.

Two hypotheses exist to explain NGC 1266's nuclear activity and excessive far-IR emission. Either a heavily obscured ultracompact starburst is present in the nuclear regions, or a powerful buried AGN is present, beyond what has been inferred from other observations. Neither scenario is without problems. The black hole at the center of the galaxy is likely growing according to the M–sigma relation, and eventually the outflow will result in the removal of the majority of the gas from the nucleus.
