= K Velorum =

The Bayer designations k Velorum and K Velorum are distinct. Due to technical limitations, both designations link here. For the star

- k Velorum, see HD 79940 (sometimes called k^{2} Velorum)
- k^{1} Velorum, see HD 79807
- K Velorum, see HD 80456

== See also ==
- κ Velorum (Kappa Velorum)
