= ZwCl 5247 BCG =

Brightest cluster galaxy in the constellation of Virgo

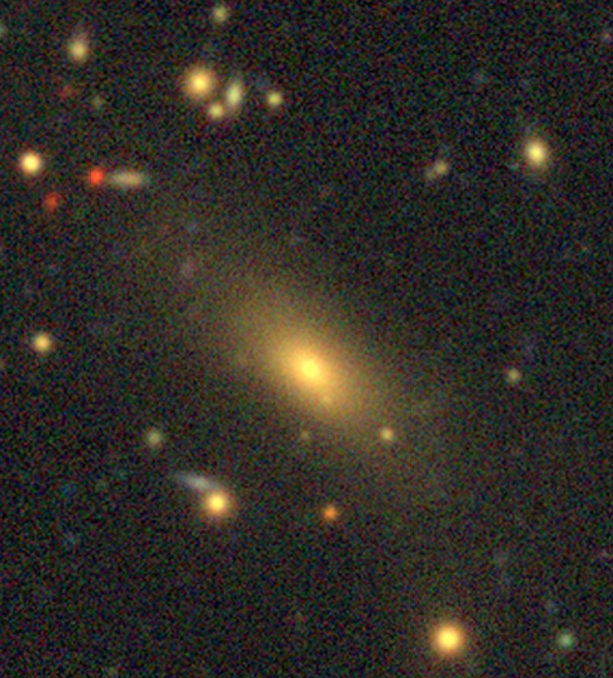
- DESI Legacy Surveys image of ZwCl 5247 BCG

Observation data (J2000.0 epoch)
- Constellation: Virgo
- Right ascension: 12^{h} 34^{m} 17.46^{s}
- Declination: +09° 45′ 58.38″
- Redshift: 0.230558
- Heliocentric radial velocity: 69,119 ± 16 km/s
- Distance: 3,322.2 ± 232.5 Mly (1,018.58 ± 71.30 Mpc)
- Group or cluster: ZwCl 5247
- magnitude (J): 14.68

Characteristics
- Type: BrClG
- Size: ~592,000 ly (181.5 kpc) (estimated)

Other designations
- 2MASX J12341746+0945577, [BCB2018] BCG 00024, LEDA 1369756, OGC 0090, GMBCG J188.57277+09.76624 BCG, ZwCl 1231.4+1007:[CAE99], SDSS J123417.46+094558.3, WHL J123417.5+094558 BCG

ZwCl 5247 BCG (Short for Zwicky Cluster 5247 Brightest Cluster Galaxy) and also known as OGC 90, is a massive elliptical galaxy located in the constellation of Virgo. The redshift of the galaxy is (z) 0.230 and it is the brightest cluster galaxy of a rich galaxy cluster, ZwCl 5247 which is known as ZwCl 1231.4+1007.

== Description ==
ZwCl 5247 BCG is an elliptical galaxy with an r-band luminosity of 12.9 magnitude based on an r-band luminosity estimation made with the Sloan Digital Sky Survey (SDSS). It is also a central dominant galaxy, with its optical spectrum lacking any emission lines. The effective radius is 4.4 arcseconds, with the BCG itself having a boxy morphology. The total infrared luminosity of the BCG in i-band is 21.94 × 10^{10} L_{☉}.

The BCG also contains a weak radio source, with the radio core contributing a total flux density of less than 0.15 mJy and less than 0.13 at 10 GHz frequencies. The diffused aging component, interpreted as a non-core, contributes less than 3 mJy at 1 GHz. The total radio power is less than 23.55 W Hz^{−1} at 1.4 GHz, making it a radio-quiet BCG. There is no detection of hydrogen-alpha emission.

The BCG has a total stellar mass of 0.40 × 10^{12} M_{☉}. The J–K magnitude is 1.28.
