= SDSS J095418.15+471725.1 =

Galaxy in the constellation Ursa Major

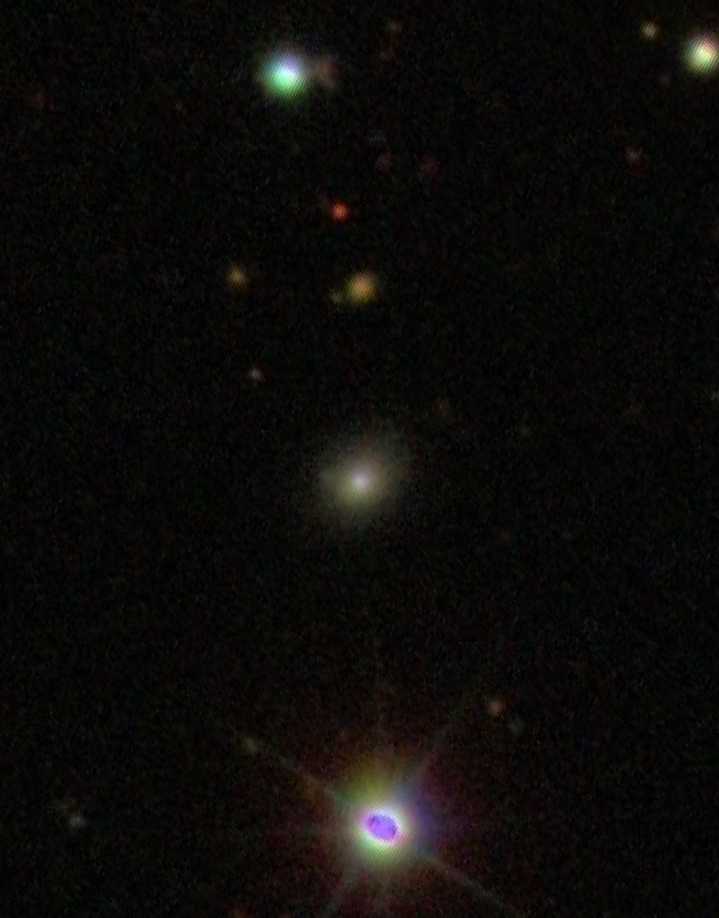
- The dwarf galaxy, SDSS J095418.15+471725.1.

Observation data (J2000 epoch)
- Constellation: Ursa Major
- Right ascension: 09^{h} 54^{m} 18.15^{s}
- Declination: +47° 17′ 25.09″
- Redshift: 0.032660
- Heliocentric radial velocity: 9791 ± 3
- Distance: 472.2 ± 33.0 Mly (144.77 ± 10.13 Mpc)
- magnitude (J): 15.58

Characteristics
- Size: ~47,000 ly (14.5 kpc) (estimated)

Other designations
- 2MASX J09541809+4717246, SDSS J095418.16+471725.1, LEDA 2295658, NSA 125318, ASK 697104.0, [RGG2013] 011

SDSS J095418.15+471725.1 also known as RGG 11 or J0954+47 is a dwarf galaxy located in the constellation of Ursa Major. The redshift of the galaxy is (z) 0.032 and it was first discovered in a study of dwarf galaxies which are shown to contain active black holes in 2013.

== Description ==
SDSS J095418.15+4717255.1 is classified as a dwarf lenticular galaxy with a type S0 morphology. It contains traces of classical structures, with the inner component being described as having a round appearance and a half-light radius estimated at about 0.13 kiloparsecs. There is also an outer component that closely resembles a classic exponential disk but is also one of the largest features shown. The central supermassive black hole mass of the galaxy is estimated to be 4.9 M_{☉} and the total star formation is 1.90 M_{☉} per year. It lacks spiral arms based on imaging made by the Hubble Space Telescope (HST).

Studies published in 2019 have found the galaxy contains the presence of an active galactic nucleus (AGN). The AGN is also driving the outflows from the galaxy with velocities reaching 719 ± 9.6 kilometers per second. Another study published in 2024, has found there are also absorption features that are blueshifted. A single ionized helium emission line has also been detected. The galaxy also appears to contain no major star formation and is transitioning from a star-forming blue galaxy to a passive red dead galaxy.

A study has found one of the velocity components is blueshifted in respect of the systemic velocity with a line width that is estimated to be reaching a velocity of 1100 kilometers per second. This suggests the component is connected with fast outflows. Strong signatures of X-ray emission have been detected in the galaxy of around 9.77 × 10^{39} erg s^{−1}.
