= IC 2402 =

Galaxy in the constellation of Cancer

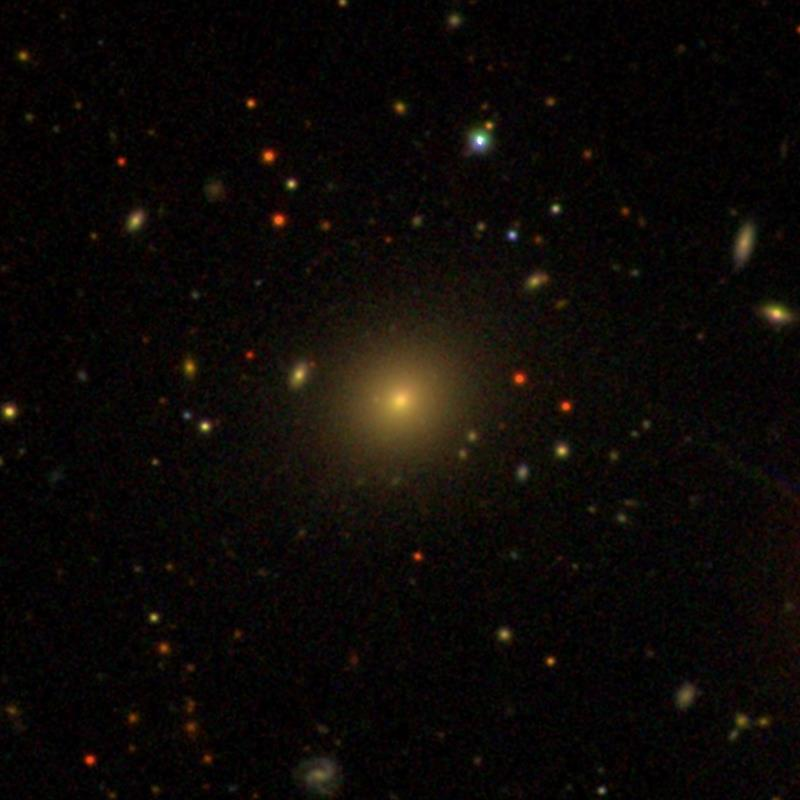
- The elliptical galaxy IC 2402.

Observation data (J2000 epoch)
- Constellation: Cancer
- Right ascension: 08^{h} 47^{m} 59.0448^{s}
- Declination: +31° 47′ 08.463″
- Redshift: 0.067306
- Heliocentric radial velocity: 20,178 km/s
- Distance: 938 Mly (287.59 Mpc)
- Group or cluster: ZW 0844.5+3208
- Apparent magnitude (V): 14.7

Characteristics
- Type: E
- Size: ~376,700 ly (115.51 kpc) (estimated)
- Notable features: Radio galaxy

Other designations
- 4C +31.32, PGC 24720, B2 0844+31B, MCG +05-21-010, TXS 0844+319, ConFIG 032, 0844+31

IC 2402 known in literature as B0844+31 or B2 0844+31, is a large elliptical galaxy located in the constellation of Cancer. The galaxy is located around 940 million light-years from Earth, which means given by its apparent dimensions, it is 370,000 light-years across. It was first discovered by Stéphane Javelle on 15 February 1896 and subsequently designated as 4C 31.32 by astronomers.

== Description ==
IC 2402 is the brightest cluster galaxy (BCG) of the galaxy cluster ZW 0844.5+3208. It is classified as a narrow-line Fanaroff-Riley type 2 (FR II) radio galaxy or a double low-luminosity radio galaxy. It has a brightness profile best described as following the de Vancouleurs law with isophotes twisted by 30 degrees from its nucleus to the external parts of the galaxy. The radio structure of the galaxy imaged by radio mapping at 0.6 and 1.4 GHz frequencies shows a double source displaying low intensity regions along its eastern side. The two components of the source have an increased spectral index towards the north, with the central region dominated by a core. A radio jet can be seen, which subsequently becomes fainter and wider upon travelling from the core. Resolving into a main jet and counter-jet, they both display sine wave type oscillations.

The radio lobes of the galaxy are polarized and symmetrical. However, the southern radio lobe is significantly depolarized compared to the northern radio lobe, displaying depolarization ratios of 0.45 ± 0.1 and 0.85 ± 0.1, but it has a positive rotation measure of 25 rad m^{−2}. Both lobes are shown to have spectral index variations, with the outer ridges of the radio emission having spectral indices of ~0.8–0.9 and ~1.0 respectively. The lobes also contain hot spots which are anti-symmetric in appearance.

A study published in 2005, shows the galaxy's radio lobes are classified as Fanaroff-Riley type 1 (FR I) according to a Faint Images of the Radio Sky at Twenty-Centimeters (FIRST) survey conducted by Very Large Array (VLA). Further evidence also pointed out these lobes are located far from the nucleus beyond the hotspots, suggesting the source can be categorized as restarted; a source best described having an FR I extended structure relating to prior activity whereas the FR II inner structure is originating from recent activity from the core.
