= Jaffe profile =

The Jaffe profile (or Jaffe model) is a mathematical function that is used to describe the distribution of mass or light in elliptical galaxies and the bulges of spiral galaxies. It was proposed by the astronomer Walter Jaffe in 1983. Its usefulness derives from the fact that it accurately reproduces a de Vaucouleurs profile when projected onto the sky.

The density in the Jaffe model is given by

$$\rho (r) = {\rho_0\over 4\pi}\left({r\over r_0}\right)^{-2} \left(1+{r\over r_0}\right)^{-2}.$$

In this equation, $\rho_0$ and $r_0$ are parameters that can be varied to fit the observed density.

Jaffe described how he arrived at his model:

[The formula] was derived heuristically from the observation that the brightness profiles of spherical galaxies seem to run as $r^{-3}$ and $r^{-1}$ in at least some parts of their envelopes and cores, respectively. This would imply that the spatial density runs as $r^{-4}$ and $r^{-2}$.

Variations on Jaffe's law include the Hernquist profile, the Dehnen profile and the NFW profile, which have a similar functional form as Jaffe's law but which use different values for the two exponents.
