= PKS 0442−28 =

Radio galaxy in the constellation of Eridanus

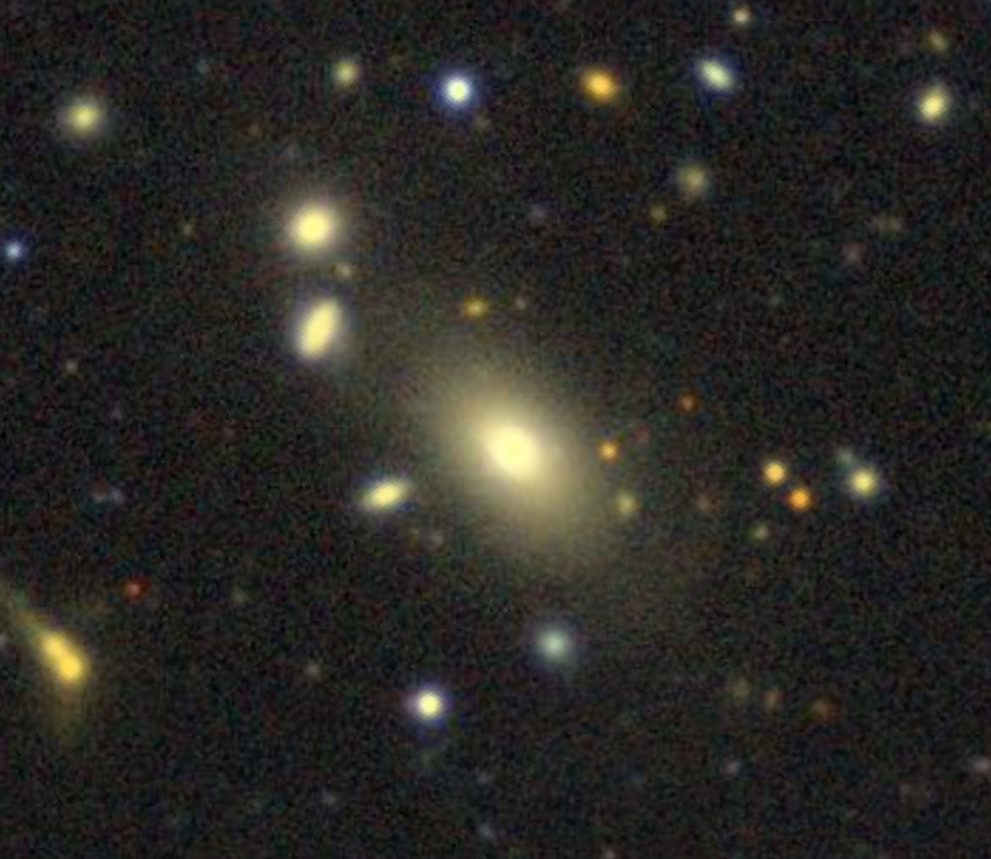
- DESI Legacy Surveys image of PKS 0442−28

Observation data (J2000.0 epoch)
- Constellation: Eridanus
- Right ascension: 04^{h} 44^{m} 37.70^{s}
- Declination: −28° 09′ 54.36″
- Redshift: 0.151468
- Heliocentric radial velocity: 45,409 km/s
- Distance: 1.965 Gly
- Apparent magnitude (B): 18.5

Characteristics
- Type: Elliptical NLRG
- Size: ~360,000 ly (110 kpc) (estimated)

Other designations
- 2MASX J04443770−2809544, LEDA 745026, OF −271, MRSS 421−046487, TXS 0442−028, G4Jy 0492, PAPER J071.19−28.21, Cul 0442−082

PKS 0442−28 is a narrow-line radio galaxy located in the constellation of Eridanus. The redshift of the galaxy is (z) 0.151 and it was first discovered as an astronomical radio source by astronomers led by J.G. Bolton in December 1965.

== Description ==
PKS 0442−28 is classified as a Type 2 Fanaroff-Riley Class radio galaxy. Its host is an elliptical galaxy based on a de Vaucouleurs model. The total dust mass of the galaxy is estimated to be <6.5 M_{☉}. It also has been classified as a Seyfert type 2 galaxy. It has a total flux density of 22.0 ± 0.3 mJy at 24 ɥm and 31.0 ± 5.0 at 70 ɥm.

The host galaxy has a shell-like structure 50 kiloparsecs from the central nucleus in a southwest direction. The shell has an estimated surface brightness of around 25.7 magnitude per arcsecond. Several other galaxies are found within the field of the host galaxy, suggested to be interacting with it.

Radio imaging made with the Very Large Array (VLA) have shown the source has a complex morphology. The source has both radio lobes and a compact radio core, however there are no signs of a radio jet. An image made by the Chandra X-ray Observatory showed there is also radio emission extended and surrounding the base of its northern radio lobe. A bright region is found in the northern radio lobe in addition. There are more detections of radio emission in the galaxy's other regions and hot spot features.
