= B2 1521+28 =

Radio galaxy in the constellation of Corona Borealis

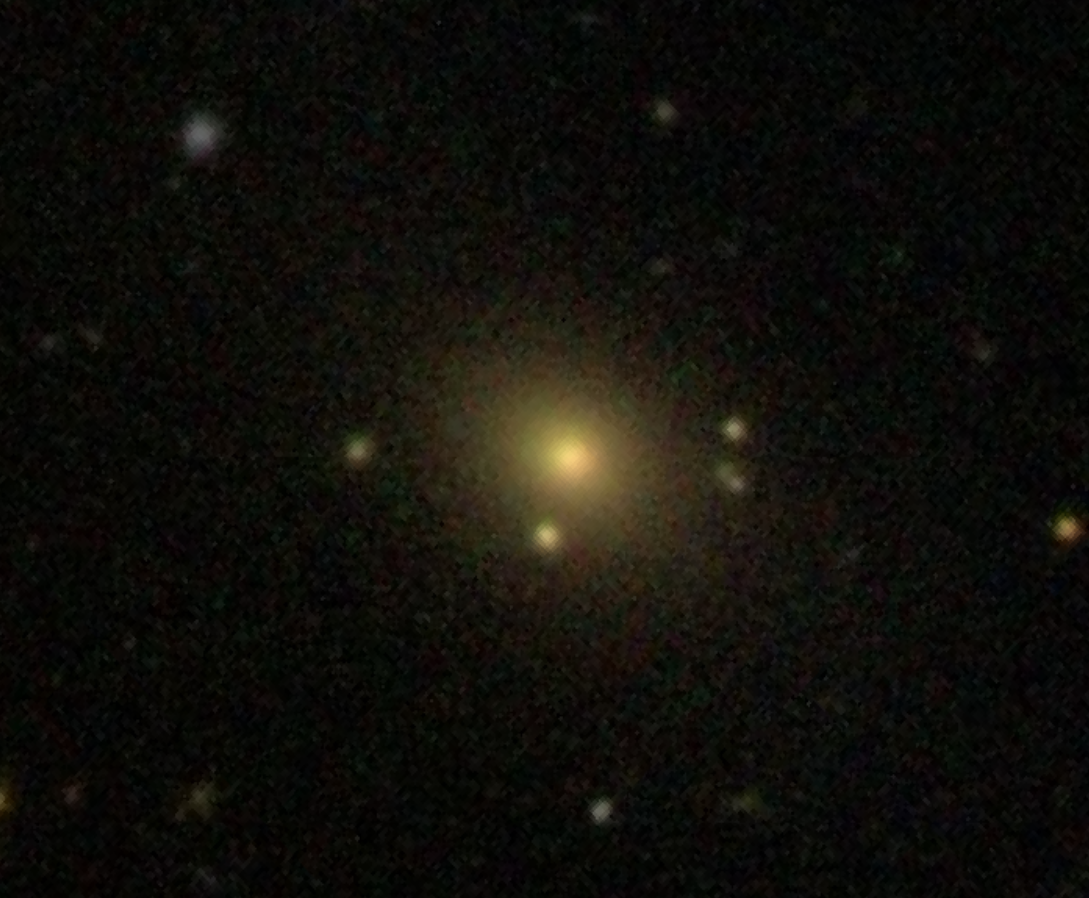
- The radio galaxy B2 1521+28

Observation data (J2000.0 epoch)
- Constellation: Corona Borealis
- Right ascension: 15^{h} 23^{m} 26.91^{s}
- Declination: +28° 37′ 32.52″
- Redshift: 0.082428
- Heliocentric radial velocity: 24,711 km/s
- Distance: 1.136 Gly
- Apparent magnitude (V): 15.5
- Apparent magnitude (B): 15.68

Characteristics
- Size: ~243,300 ly (74.60 kpc) (estimated)

Other designations
- 2MASX J15232693+2837323, 4C +28.39, Cul 1521+287, SDSS J152326.90+283732.5, NPM1G +28.0337, PGC 54951

B2 1521+28 is a radio galaxy located in the constellation of Corona Borealis. The redshift of the galaxy is (z) 0.082 and it was first discovered as an astronomical radio source in 1967 by E.T. Olsen at the Owens Valley Radio Observatory. In 1972, C. Hazard and D.L. Jauncey identified the source to be associated with an elliptical galaxy which is a member of the galaxy cluster ZW 1521.0+2835.

== Description ==
B2 1521+28 is classified as a low-luminosity radio galaxy with an elliptical host. Its surface brightness profile is excessive over the De Vaucouleurs's law model mainly in the external parts of the host galaxy. Imaging made with Hubble Space Telescope, showed there is an unresolved nucleus located at the position of the galaxy core.

B2 1521+28 has a compact radio source. When observed with Very Large Array (VLA), the source contains a bright radio core with a radio spectrum found mainly either inverted or flat. In additional, it has a pair of two radio lobes that are asymmetric in terms of radio flux and also in extension from the position of the radio core. The lobe on the northern side displays marginal spectral gradients while the lobe on the southern side has a spectral index around the hotspot with it steepening. Both lobes also has polarization with depolarization ratios being 0.29 ± 0.05 for the northern lobe and 0.74 ± 0.05 for the southern lobe. There is also a weak hotspot located in the southern lobe with an increasing spectral index upon reaching outwards.

Observations found there is a radio jet present in B2 1521+28. Based on results, the jet is found to be one-sided. There are also several brightness knots present with the jet itself displaying a small amplitude oscillations in its main bright part. A major bending is observed towards the west direction which is subsequently followed by a counter-bend in the eastern direction. The spectral index of the jet is estimated to be 0.65 ± 0.05 from the core position by 20 kiloparsecs.
