= PKS 2349−014 =

Seyfert galaxy and low-redshift quasar located in the constellation of Pisces

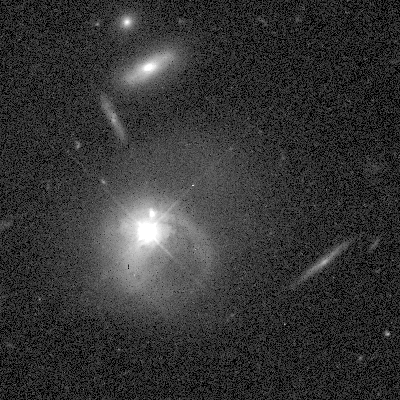
- HST image of PKS 2349−014.

Observation data (J2000.0 epoch)
- Constellation: Pisces
- Right ascension: 23^{h} 51^{m} 56.12^{s}
- Declination: −01° 09′ 13.31″
- Redshift: 0.173820
- Heliocentric radial velocity: 52,110 km/s
- Distance: 2.209 Gly
- Apparent magnitude (V): 16.59

Characteristics
- Type: N galaxy Sy1
- Size: 145.63 kiloparsecs (475,000 light-years) (diameter; 2MASS K-band total isophote)

Other designations
- PG 2349-014, 4C -01.61, 2MASX J23515609-0109137, PGC 72664, 6dF J2351560-010913, RBS 2056, IRAS F23493-0126, OZ -082, PB 5564, NVSS J235156-010916, LEDA 197065

PKS 2349−014 is a Seyfert type 1 galaxy and a low-redshift quasar located in the constellation of Pisces. The redshift of the object is (z) 0.173 and it was first discovered by J.G. Bolton as a radio source in 1968 where it was designated as PKS 2349−01. It is also classified as a broad-line radio galaxy and is radio-loud.

== Description ==
PKS 2349−014 is classified as a radio-loud luminous quasar. The host galaxy is an elliptical galaxy based on a de Vaucouleurs model. Imaging by the Hubble Space Telescope (HST), described it as having a highly disturbed appearance, with large tidal arms depicted as oddly shaped, indicating an interaction with a nearby companion galaxy described as having a faint magnitude of 21.0 ± 0.3. There are several other galaxies located around the field of the object.

Two smooth wisp features are found to surround PKS 2349−014, forming an almost complete ring-like structure with an extent of 20 kiloparsecs and brighter when closer to the center of the object. One of the wisps on the eastern side seems to penetrate its companion. Evidence pointed out these wisps are the remains of a bright galaxy tidally accreted by the host galaxy, indicating a complete merger prior to the interaction with the companion.

The object shows an unresolved central nucleus. There is also a faint off-centered nebula extension with a low average surface brightness of 24.4 mag arcsec^{−2}, a major and minor axis extension of 48 and 34 kiloparsecs respectively. From the nucleus on the northeast region, several traces of dust lane remnants can be seen.

The spectrum of PKS 2349−014 is mainly dominated by both narrow forbidden and strong broad permitted emission lines. It is also shown the object has a post starburst stellar population mostly made up of old stars of 12 billion years with evidence of younger stars aged around 500 million years. The total stellar mass is estimated to be 12.2 × 10^{11} M_{☉} while the star formation rate is approximately 8.3 M_{☉} per year. A supermassive black hole mass of 8.41 ± 0.06 M_{☉} was calculated for PKS 2349−014 based on a Hβ line.
