= Mikulski Archive for Space Telescopes =

Astronomical data archive

The Mikulski Archive for Space Telescopes (MAST) is an astronomical data archive. The archive brings together data from the visible, ultraviolet, and near-infrared wavelength regimes. The NASA funded project is located at the Space Telescope Science Institute (STScI) in Baltimore, Maryland and is one of the largest astronomical databases in the world.

The archive was named after Barbara Ann Mikulski, a long time champion of the Hubble and James Webb space telescopes, in 2012. It is a component of NASA's distributed Space Science Data Services. The archive contains the data from a number of instruments like Pan-Starrs, Kepler, and TESS, as well as data for the Hubble Space Telescope (HST) and James Webb Space Telescope (JWST).

In October 2020 the project released the largest and most detailed 3D maps of the Universe, the classification and photometric redshift catalog "PS1-STRM". The data was created using neural networks and combines data from the Sloan Digital Sky Survey and others. Users can query the dataset online or download it in its entirety of ~300GB.
