= 2691 Sérsic =

Main-belt asteroid binary

Discovery
- Discovered by: Felix Aguilar Obs.
- Discovery site: El Leoncito Complex
- Discovery date: 18 May 1974

Designations
- Named after: José Sérsic (Argentine astronomer)
- Alternative designations: 1974 KB · 1938 UU; 1978 QR_{1}
- Minor planet category: main-belt · Flora

Orbital characteristics
- Epoch 4 September 2017 (JD 2458000.5)
- Uncertainty parameter 0
- Observation arc: 67.02 yr (24,480 days)
- Aphelion: 2.4977 AU
- Perihelion: 1.9915 AU
- Semi-major axis: 2.2446 AU
- Eccentricity: 0.1127
- Orbital period (sidereal): 3.36 yr (1,228 days)
- Mean anomaly: 312.67°
- Mean motion: 0° 17^{m} 35.16^{s} / day
- Inclination: 3.5937°
- Longitude of ascending node: 319.88°
- Argument of perihelion: 277.14°
- Known satellites: 1

Physical characteristics
- Dimensions: 5.438±0.119; 6.21 km (calculated)
- Synodic rotation period: 3.8811±0.0003 h
- Geometric albedo: 0.24 (assumed); 0.261±0.062
- Spectral type: S
- Absolute magnitude (H): 13.2

2691 Sérsic, provisional designation 1974 KB, is a stony Florian asteroid and binary system from the inner regions of the asteroid belt, approximately 6 kilometers in diameter. It was discovered by staff members at the Felix Aguilar Observatory at El Leoncito Complex in Argentina, on 18 May 1974. The asteroid was named after Argentine astronomer José Luis Sérsic.

== Classification and orbit ==
Sérsic is a member of the Flora family, one of the largest groups of stony asteroids in the main-belt. It orbits the Sun in the inner main-belt at a distance of 2.0–2.5 AU once every 3 years and 4 months (1,228 days). Its orbit has an eccentricity of 0.11 and an inclination of 4° with respect to the ecliptic.

== Physical characteristics ==
=== Diameter and albedo ===
The Collaborative Asteroid Lightcurve Link assumes an albedo of 0.24 – derived from 8 Flora, the largest member and namesake of this orbital family – and calculates a diameter of 6.21 kilometers with an absolute magnitude of 13.2.

=== Satellite ===
Sérsic is a binary asteroid. A minor-planet moon was discovered in 2011 from lightcurve observations of the asteroid. It has a diameter of 2.15 ± 0.11 and an orbital period of 1 day, 2 hours, and 48 minutes.

== Naming ==
This minor planet was named in honor of José Luis Sérsic (1933–1993), well known for his work in extragalactic astronomy and on supernovae (also see Sérsic profile and Lenticular galaxy § Sérsic decomposition). He has served as director of the Córdoba Observatory. The approved naming citation was published by the Minor Planet Center on 20 February 1989 (M.P.C. 14207).
