= HD 79940 =

Star in the constellation Vela

- Location of HD 79940 (circled in red)

Observation data Epoch J2000.0 Equinox ICRS
- Constellation: Vela
- Right ascension: 09^{h} 15^{m} 45.07943^{s}
- Declination: −37° 24′ 47.3124″
- Apparent magnitude (V): 4.63

Characteristics
- Spectral type: F3/5V or F5III
- B−V color index: 0.473±0.002

Astrometry
Radial velocity (R_{v})	+5.8±2.8 km/s
Proper motion (μ)	RA: +14.128 mas/yr Dec.: −8.111 mas/yr
Parallax (π)	20.5985±0.1895 mas
Distance	158 ± 1 ly (48.5 ± 0.4 pc)
Absolute magnitude (M_{V})	1.12

Details
Mass	1.36 M_{☉}
Radius	4.35+0.11 −0.19 R_{☉}
Luminosity	28.427±0.305 L_{☉}
Surface gravity (log g)	3.26±0.14 cgs
Temperature	6,388+143 −76 K
Metallicity [Fe/H]	0.20±0.15 dex
Rotational velocity (v sin i)	117.2±5.9 km/s
Age	2.76 Gyr

Other designations
- k Vel, CD−36 5505, GJ 339.3, GJ 9293, HD 79940, HIP 45448, HR 3684, SAO 200163, WDS J09158-3725A, k^{2} Vel

Database references
SIMBAD	data

HD 79940 is a single star in the southern constellation of Vela. It has the Bayer designation of k Velorum; HD 79940 is the identifier from the Henry Draper Catalogue. This star has a yellow-white hue and is faintly visible to the naked eye as a point light source with an apparent visual magnitude of 4.63. It is located at a distance of approximately 158 light-years from the Sun based on parallax, and is drifting further away with a radial velocity of +6 km/s.

There has been some disagreement over the stellar classification of this star. In 1975, S. Maladora found a class of F5III, suggesting an evolved F-type star, matching an earlier (1957) classification by A. de Vaucouleurs. N. Houk assigned it a class of F3/5V in 1979, matching an F-type main-sequence star. It has a high rate of spin with a projected rotational velocity of 117.2±5.9 km/s. This may explain why it was incorrectly classified as a spectroscopic binary in 1972.

There is a faint magnitude 14.50 companion at an angular separation of 11.3″ along a position angle of 126° from the brighter star. This was discovered by T. J. J. See in 1897.
