= Mass deficit =

Lack of stellar mass in the centers of galaxies

In astronomy, mass deficit is the amount of mass (in stars) that has been removed from the center of a galaxy, presumably by the action of a binary, supermassive black hole.

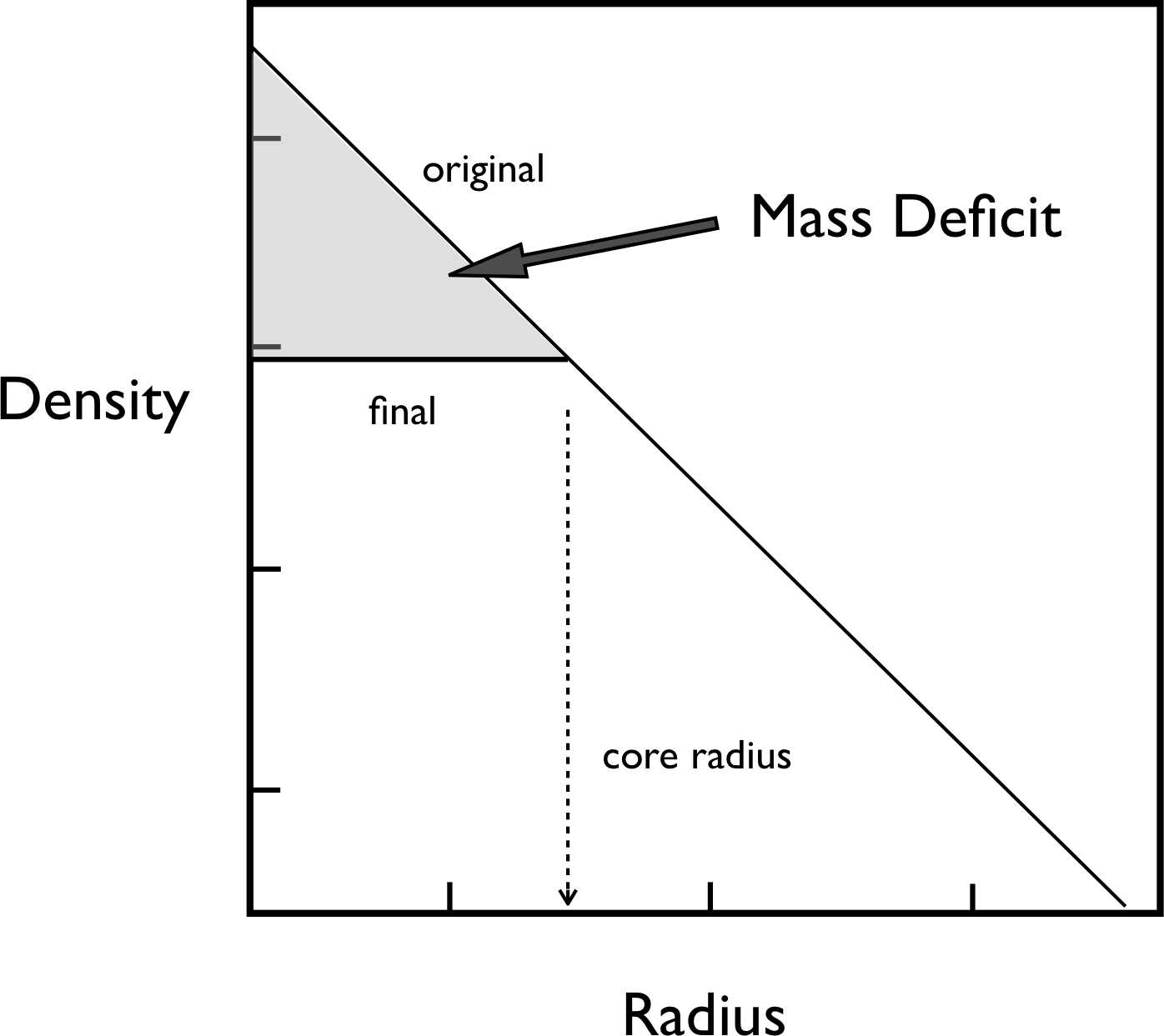
The figure illustrates how mass deficits are measured, using the observed brightness profile of a galaxy

The density of stars increases toward the center in most galaxies. In small galaxies, this increase continues into the very center. In large galaxies, there is usually a "core", a region near the center where the density is constant or slowly rising. The size of the core – the "core radius" – can be a few hundred parsecs in large elliptical galaxies. The greatest observed stellar cores reach 3.2 to 5.7 kiloparsecs in radius.

It is believed that cores are produced by binary supermassive black holes (SMBHs). Binary SMBHs form during the merger of two galaxies. If a star passes near the massive binary, it will be ejected, by a process called the gravitational slingshot. This ejection continues until most of the stars near the center of the galaxy have been removed. The result is a low-density core. Such cores are ubiquitous in giant elliptical galaxies.

The mass deficit is defined as the amount of mass that was removed in creating the core. Mathematically, the mass deficit is defined as
$$M_\mathrm{def} = 4 \pi \int_0^{R_c} \left[\rho_i(r) - \rho(r) \right]r^2 dr,$$

where ρ_{i} is the original density, ρ is the observed density, and R_{c} is the core radius. In practice, the core-Sersic model can be used to help quantify the deficits.

Observed mass deficits are typically in the range of one to a few times the mass of the central SMBH, and observed core radii are comparable to the influence radii of the central SMBH. These properties are consistent with what is predicted in theoretical models of core formation and lend support to the hypothesis that all bright galaxies once contained binary SMBHs at their centers.

It is not known whether most galaxies still contain massive binaries, or whether the two black holes have coalesced. Both possibilities are consistent with the presence of mass deficits.
