= Gérard de Vaucouleurs =

French astronomer (1918–1995)

- Born: Gérard Henri de Vaucouleurs; 25 April 1918; Paris, France
- Died: 7 October 1995 (aged 77); Austin, Texas
- Education: Lycée Charlemagne (BSc, 1936); Sorbonne (PhD, 1949)
- Known for: De Vaucouleurs's law
- Spouse: Antoinette de Vaucouleurs (m. 1944; died 1988)
- Awards: Henry Norris Russell Lectureship (1988); Prix Jules Janssen (1988)
- Scientific career
- Fields: Astronomy
- Workplaces: Yale University Observatory; Lowell Observatory; Harvard College Observatory; University of Texas at Austin

Gérard Henri de Vaucouleurs (French pronunciation: [ʒeʁaʁ ɑ̃ʁi də vokulœʁ]; 25 April 1918 – 7 October 1995) was a French astronomer best known for his studies of galaxies.

== Life and career ==
Gérard de Vaucouleurs was born on April 25, 1918 in Paris, he took the maiden name of his mother as his last name. He had an early interest in amateur astronomy and received his undergraduate degree in 1939 at the Sorbonne in that city.

After military service in World War II, he resumed his pursuit of astronomy. He was married to fellow astronomer Antoinette de Vaucouleurs on October 31, 1944, and the couple would frequently collaborate on astronomical research.

He was fluent in English and spent 1949-51 in England and 1951–57 in Australia at Mount Stromlo Observatory. He was at Lowell Observatory in Arizona from 1957-1958 and at Harvard from 1958-60.

In 1960 he was appointed to the University of Texas at Austin, where he spent the rest of his career. He was one of the first five faculty in the newly formed astronomy department there. His wife Antoinette died in 1987. In 1995 he died of a heart attack in his home in Austin at the age of 77. At the time of his death he had a second wife named Elysabeth.

== Research ==
His earliest work had concerned the planet Mars and while at Harvard he used telescope observations from 1909 to 1958 to study the areographic coordinates of features on the surface of Mars. His later work focused on the study of galaxies and he co-authored the Third Reference Catalogue of Bright Galaxies with his wife Antoinette (1921-1987), a fellow UT Austin astronomer and lifelong collaborator.

His specialty included reanalyzing Hubble and Sandage's galaxy atlas and recomputing the distance measurements utilizing a method of averaging many different kinds of metrics such as luminosity, the diameters of ring galaxies, brightest star clusters, etc., in a method he called "spreading the risks." During the 1950s he promoted the idea that galactic clusters are grouped into superclusters.

The de Vaucouleurs modified Hubble sequence is a widely used variant of the standard Hubble sequence.

De Vaucouleurs was awarded the Henry Norris Russell Lectureship by the American Astronomical Society in 1988. He was awarded the Prix Jules Janssen of the Société astronomique de France (Astronomical Society of France) in the same year. He and his wife and longtime collaborator, Antoinette, together produced 400 research and technical papers, 20 books and 100 articles for laymen.

== See also ==
- De Vaucouleurs's law
- Edwin Hubble
- Galaxy color–magnitude diagram
- William Wilson Morgan
- Julien Peridier
