= NGC 1175 =

Large lenticular galaxy in the constellation Perseus

Peanut Galaxy
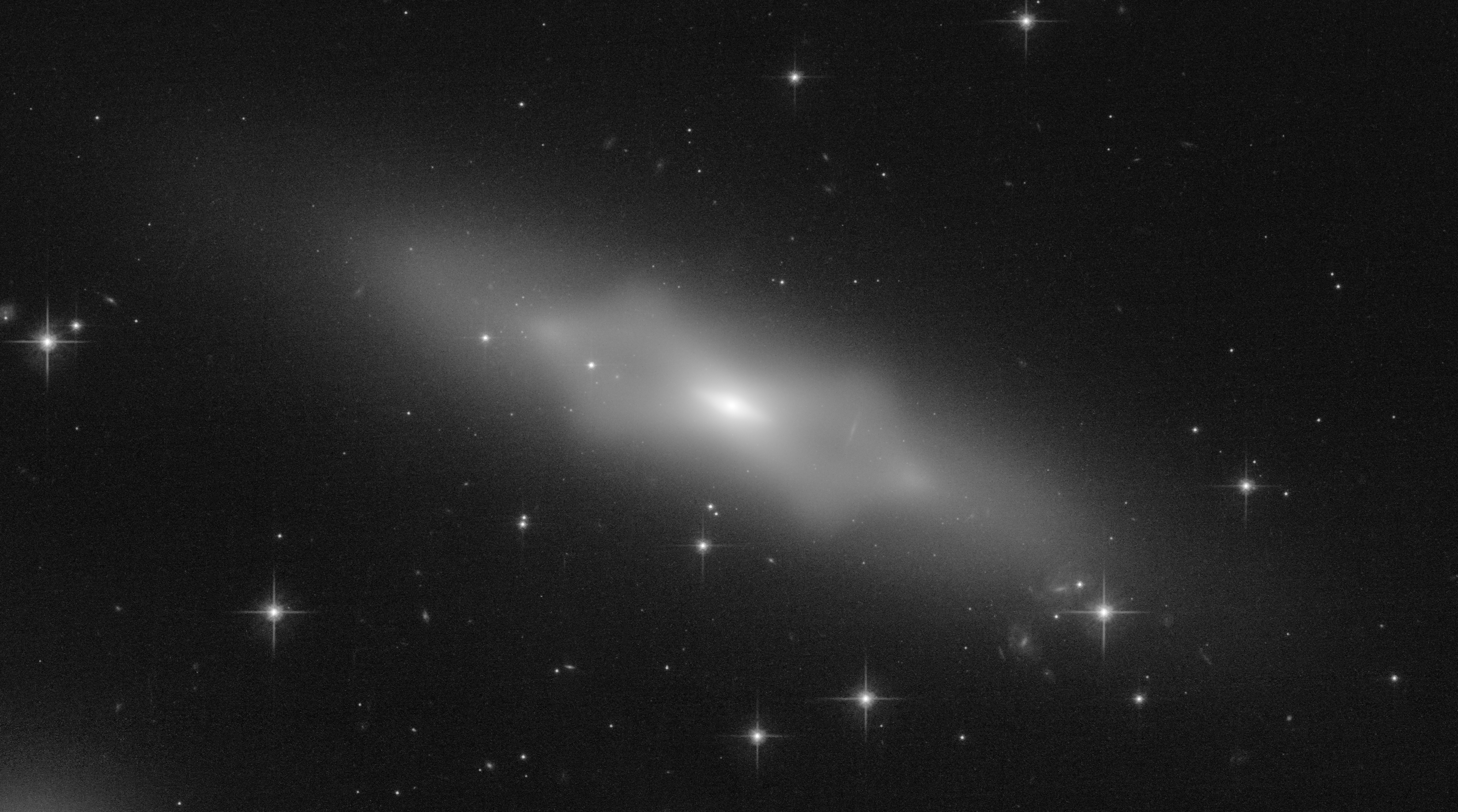
- The galaxy, as captured by the Hubble Space Telescope during the Gems of the Galaxy Zoos project

Observation data (J2000 epoch)
- Constellation: Perseus
- Right ascension: 03h 04m 32s
- Declination: +42° 20′ 21″
- Apparent magnitude (B): 13.8
- Surface brightness: 23.71 mag/arcsec^2

Characteristics
- Type: S0A-S0B-SABa

Other designations
- NGC 1175, PGC 11578, MCG 7-7-19, UGC 2515, CGCG 540-32

NGC 1175, also known as the Peanut Galaxy, is a large lenticular galaxy located in the constellation Perseus. Its speed relative to the cosmic microwave background is 5,349 ± 19 km/s, which corresponds to a Hubble distance of 78.9 ± 5.5 Mpc (~257 million ly). It was discovered by the German-British astronomer William Herschel in 1786.

It is notable for odd appearance when viewed edge-on, resembling an unshelled peanut or giant "X". Astronomers think these kinds of structures began forming around 7 billion years ago. Their formation is related to the formation of galactic bars.

NGC 1175 is about the same distance from the Milky Way as NGC 1177. These two galaxies form a gravitationally interacting pair.

To date, a non-redshift measurement gives a distance of approximately 44,900 Mpc (~146 million ly). This value is far outside the Hubble distance values. Note that it is with the average value of independent measurements, when they exist, that the NASA/IPAC database calculates the diameter of a galaxy.

== See also ==
- List of galaxies
- List of NGC objects (1001–2000)
