= José Luis Sérsic =

Argentinian astronomer (1933–1993)

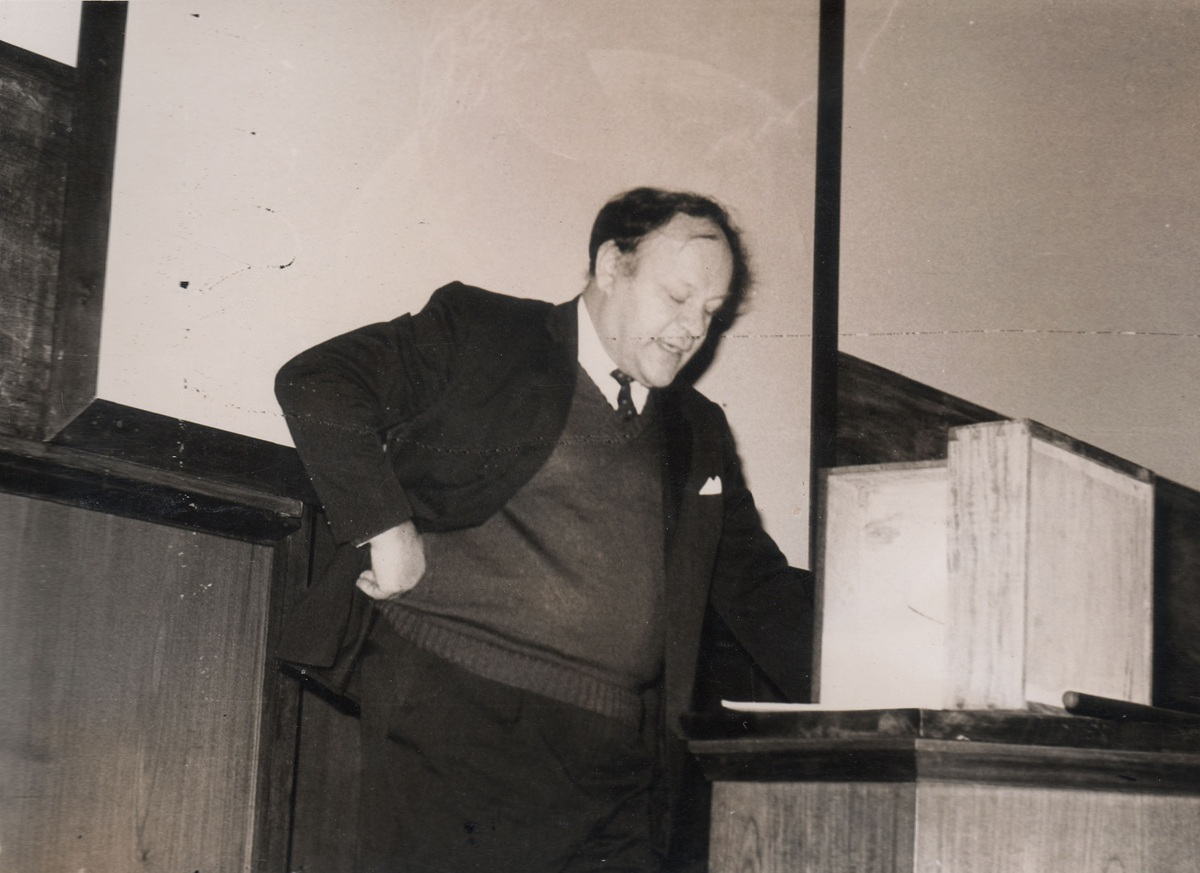
- Sérsic at a conference in 1974.
- Born: May 6, 1933; Bella Vista, Corrientes, Argentina
- Died: July 19, 1993 (aged 60); Villa Carlos Paz, Cordoba, Argentina
- Occupation: Astronomer

José Luis Sérsic (6 May 1933 – 19 July 1993) was an Argentine astronomer best known for his contributions to extragalactic astronomy. He is the namesake of the Sérsic profile, which he published in 1963.

== Biography ==
=== Early life and education ===
José Luis Sérsic was born in Bella Vista, Corrientes, Argentina on May 6, 1933.

=== Career ===
In 1956, Sérsic completed his doctorate in astronomy at the National University of La Plata on celestial mechanics. His dissertation, titled "Applications of a certain type of canonical transformations to celestial mechanics", was completed under the supervision of Reynaldo Cesco. He moved to the National Observatory of Cordoba in 1957. Sérsic was a founding member of the Argentine Astronomical Association in 1958.

In 1963, Sérsic published the mathematical function that is now known as the Sérsic profile. He was elected a member of the Royal Astronomical Society in 1964 and was awarded a Guggenheim Fellowship in 1965. In 1968 he published Atlas de Galaxias Australes, an atlas of southern sky galaxies containing photometric and morphological data. He served as director of the National Observatory of Cordoba from 1971 to 1972.

=== Death ===
He died on July 19, 1993 in Villa Carlos Paz at the age of 60.

== Legacy ==
Sérsic is regarded as a pioneer of modern astronomy in Argentina and South America. The asteroid 2691 Sersic is named in his honor.

== See also ==
- Sérsic profile
