= Adelaide Ames =

American astronomer (1900–1932)

- Born: June 3, 1900
- Died: June 26, 1932 (aged 32); Squam Lake
- Resting place: Arlington National Cemetery
- Education: Vassar College; Radcliffe College
- Occupations: Astronomer; Researcher at Harvard University
- Notable work: Shapley-Ames Catalog
- Father: T.L. Ames
- Honours: Member, American Astronomical Society; Member, IAU Commission 28 on Nebulae and Star Clusters

Adelaide Ames (June 3, 1900 – June 26, 1932) was an American astronomer and research assistant at Harvard University. She was best known for her work on detailed surveys of the brightest extra-galactic spiral nebulae. She contributed to the study of galaxies with her co-authorship of A Survey of the External Galaxies Brighter Than the Thirteenth Magnitude, which was later known as the Shapley-Ames catalog. Ames was a member of the American Astronomical Society. She was a contemporary of Cecilia Payne-Gaposchkin and her closest friend at the observatory.

Ames died in a boating accident in 1932, the same year the Shapley-Ames catalog was published.

== Biography ==
Ames attended Vassar College from 1918 to 1922, then studied at Radcliffe College, where there was a recently created graduate program in astronomy. While in college, she aspired to become a journalist and reported for the Vassar Miscellany News, in addition to taking astronomy classes. Ames became the Harvard College Observatory’s first graduate student in astronomy in January 1923. Ames graduated in 1924 as the first woman with an M.A in astronomy at Radcliffe. Ames was a member of the American Astronomical Society and was elected to the International Committee on Nebulae and Clusters in 1928. She was a delegate to the International Astronomical Union (IAU) congress in Leiden, the Netherlands in 1928, and she was the secretary of the organizing committee for the subsequent congress of the IAU, which was held at Harvard in 1932. Originally she had planned to become a journalist, but she found no work in the area and instead accepted a job as a research assistant at the Harvard College Observatory (HCO), a position she held until her death. The focus of her work was the cataloging of galaxies in the constellations Coma and Virgo. In 1931, the finished catalog included nearly 2800 objects. This work earned her membership in the IAU Commission 28 on Nebulae and Star Clusters.

On June 26, 1932, while vacationing on Squam Lake, Ames was taking a canoe tour with a friend on the lake when the boat capsized. She was presumed to have drowned and her body was found after a ten-day search on July 5, 1932. She died at the age of 32, and would later be interred at the Arlington National Cemetery.

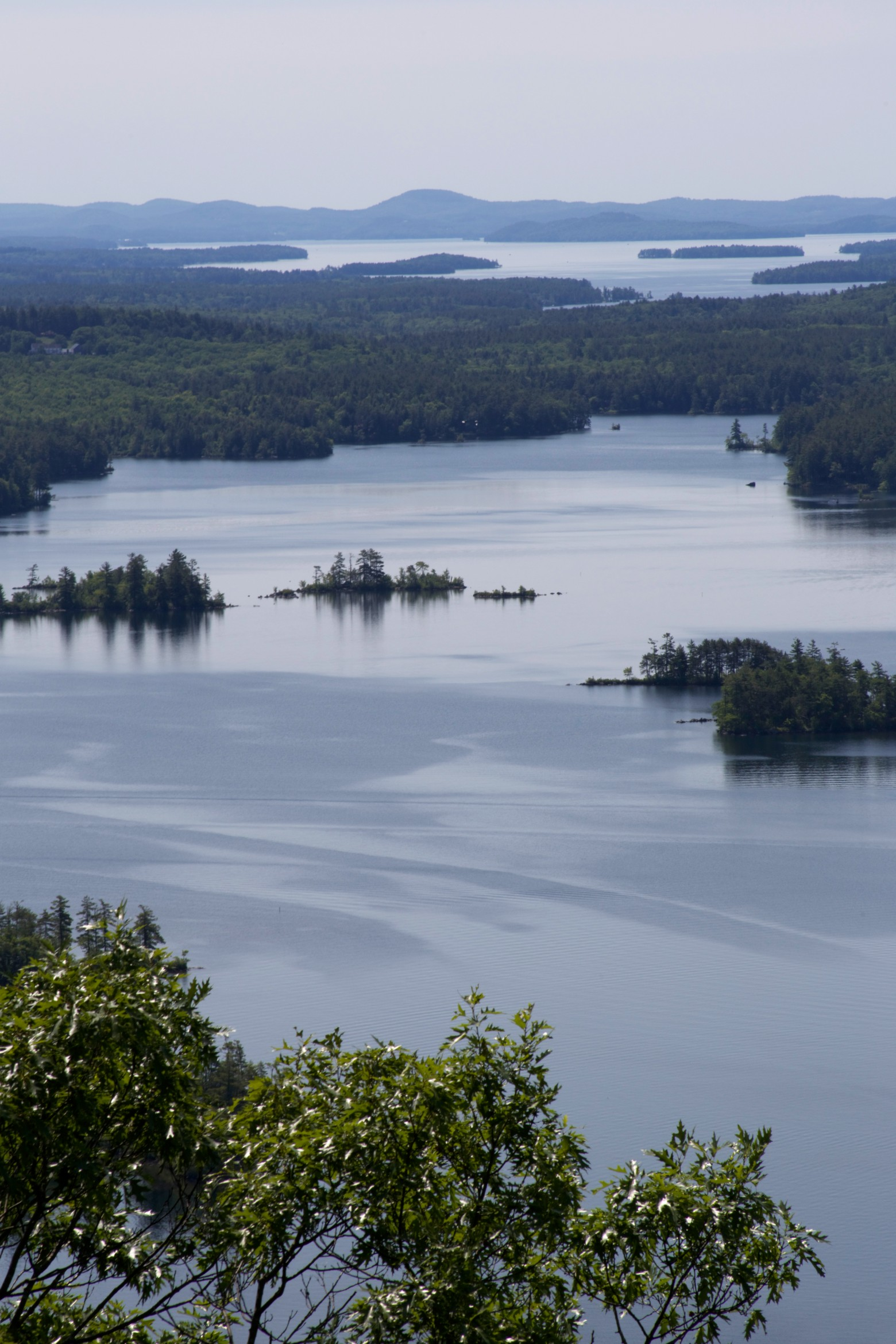
Birds eye view of Squam Lake

== Research at Harvard ==
In 1921, Harlow Shapley became director of HCO, and soon afterward hired Ames as an assistant. Ames was Shapley's first graduate student and Ames went on to supervise her own graduate students. Her early work at Harvard focused on the identification of NGC/IC objects. In 1926, she and Shapley published several articles on the shapes, colors, and diameters of 103 NGC galaxies. In 1930, she published A catalog of 2778 nebulae including the Coma-Virgo group, which identified 214 NGC and 342 IC objects in the area of the Virgo Cluster.

=== Shapley-Ames Catalog ===
During her tenure at the Harvard College Observatory, she worked together with Harlow Shapley on the Shapley-Ames catalog, which lists galaxies beyond the 13th magnitude. From their observations of approximately 1250 galaxies, they found evidence of clustering near the north pole of the Milky Way that differs from the south pole. These results were significant as their finding of "general unevenness in distribution" of galaxies deviated from the assumption of isotropy.

== Family ==
Adelaide Ames's father was T.L. Ames, who served as a colonel in the U.S. Army. Her mother was Margetta Nataline Kelton Ames. They were described by their friends as devoted and adoring parents, as Ames had no siblings. Ames often traveled to army based throughout the world with her parents, spending periods of time living in the Philippines and Washington D.C..

== See also ==
- Supercluster
