= Shapley-Ames Catalog =

Catalog of galaxies

The Shapley-Ames Catalog of Bright Galaxies is a catalog of galaxies published in 1932 that includes observations of 1249 objects brighter than 13.2 magnitude. It was compiled by Harlow Shapley and Adelaide Ames. They identified 1189 objects based on the New General Catalogue and 48 based on the Index Catalogue. With the help of new photographic recordings, which also contained comparison stars of known brightness, the brightness of many galaxies were measured and recorded only up to a magnitude of 13.2. It was the first compilation of bright galaxies in the northern and southern sky. The catalog contains position, brightness, size, and Hubble classification of the galaxies. For the next 60 years, astronomers referred to this catalog as a primary source for information about redshifts and galaxy types.

== History ==
Shapley and Ames began their study of all nearby galaxies in 1926. An important finding from this research was that the galaxies were not evenly distributed (they violated the isotropy assumption) in that the northern hemisphere contained more galaxies than the southern hemisphere. It also found that the Virgo cloud extended further than previously believed. From this data, Shapley and Ames therefore created a new hierarchy of clusters called a supercluster, which is a cluster of galaxy clusters, and called this Virgo cloud in the northern hemisphere a "Local Supercluster".

In 1981, Allan Sandage and Gustav Tammann published an updated version known as the Revised Shapley-Ames Catalog (RSA). The original list of galaxies was maintained, with the exception of three objects which were no longer considered galaxies. The information on the 1246 individual galaxies have been updated and substantially extended.
