= Galactic bulge =

Tightly packed group of stars within a larger formation

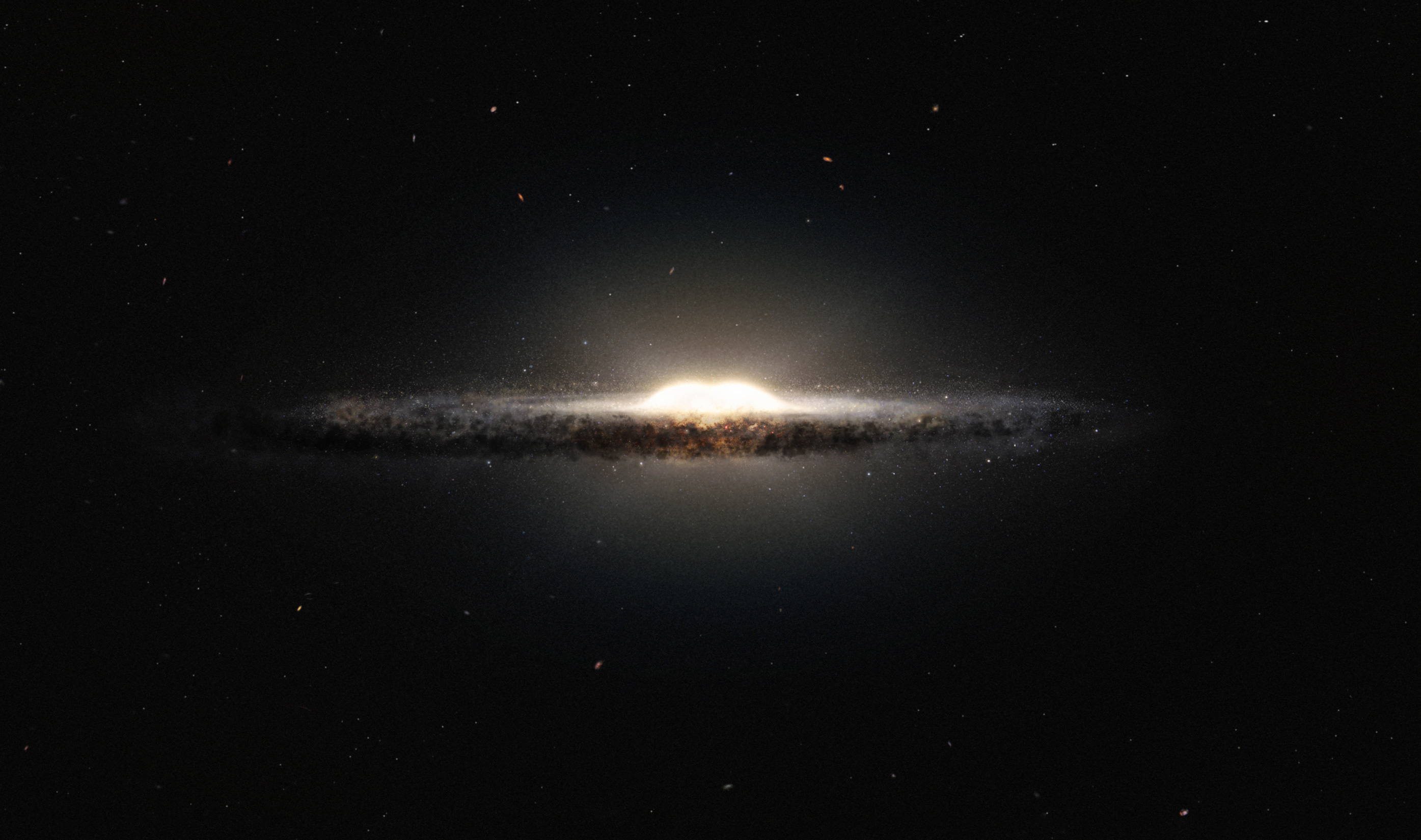
Artist's impression of the central bulge of the Milky Way

In astronomy, a galactic bulge (or simply bulge) is a tightly packed group of stars within a larger star formation. The term almost exclusively refers to the group of stars found near the center of most spiral galaxies. Bulges were historically thought to be elliptical galaxies that happened to have a disk of stars around them, but high-resolution images using the Hubble Space Telescope have revealed that many bulges lie at the heart of a spiral galaxy. It is now thought that there are at least two types of bulges: bulges that are like ellipticals and bulges that are like spiral galaxies.

== Classical bulges ==
An image of Messier 81, a galaxy with a classical bulge. The spiral structure ends at the onset of the bulge.

Bulges that have properties similar to those of elliptical galaxies are often called "classical bulges" due to their similarity to the historic view of bulges. These bulges are composed primarily of stars that are older, Population II stars, and hence have a reddish hue (see stellar evolution). These stars are also in orbits that are essentially random compared to the plane of the galaxy, giving the bulge a distinct spherical form. Due to the lack of dust and gases, bulges tend to have almost no star formation. The distribution of light is described by a Sersic profile, which increases dramatically with lower radius.

Classical bulges are thought to be the result of collisions of smaller structures. Convulsing gravitational forces and torques disrupt the orbital paths of stars, resulting in the randomized bulge orbits. If either progenitor galaxy was gas-rich, the tidal forces can also cause inflows to the newly merged galaxy nucleus. Following a major merger, gas clouds are more likely to convert into stars, due to shocks (see star formation). One study has suggested that about 80% of galaxies in the field lack a classical bulge, indicating that they have never experienced a major merger. The number of bulge-less galaxies in the Universe has remained roughly constant for at least the last 8 billion years. In contrast, about 2/3 of galaxies in dense galaxy clusters (such as the Virgo Cluster) do possess a classical bulge, demonstrating the disruptive effect of their crowding.

== Disk-like bulges ==
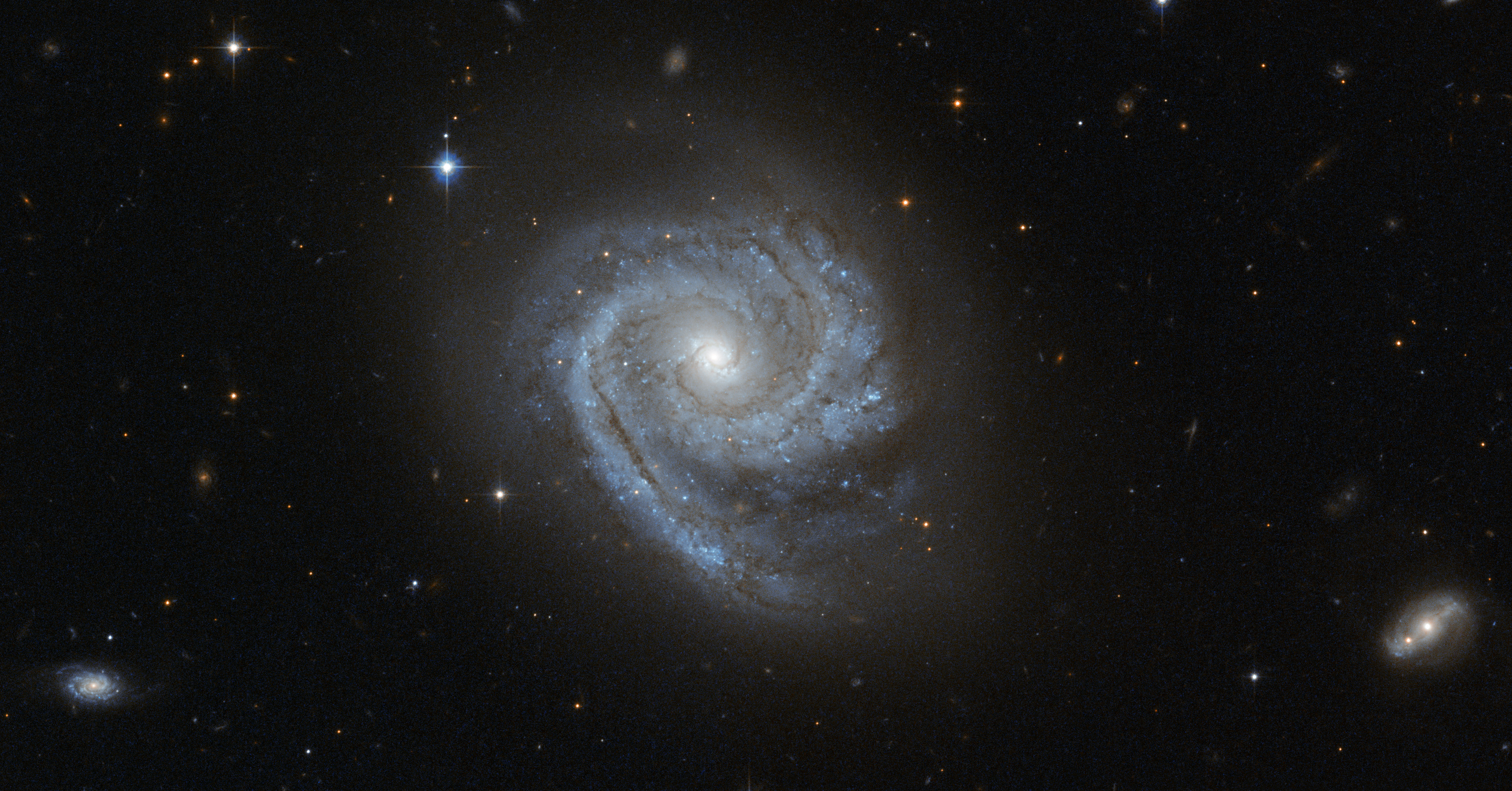
Astronomers refer to the distinctive spiral-like bulge of galaxies such as ESO 498-G5 as disc-type bulges, or pseudobulges.

Many bulges have properties more similar to those of the central regions of spiral galaxies than elliptical galaxies. They are often referred to as pseudobulges or disky-bulges. These bulges have stars that are not orbiting randomly, but rather orbit in an ordered fashion in the same plane as the stars in the outer disk. This contrasts greatly with elliptical galaxies.

Subsequent studies (using the Hubble Space Telescope) show that the bulges of many galaxies are not devoid of dust, but rather show a varied and complex structure. This structure often looks similar to a spiral galaxy, but is much smaller. Giant spiral galaxies are typically 2–100 times the size of those spirals that exist in bulges. Where they exist, these central spirals dominate the light of the bulge in which they reside. Typically the rate at which new stars are formed in pseudobulges is similar to the rate at which stars form in disk galaxies. Sometimes bulges contain nuclear rings that are forming stars at much higher rate (per area) than is typically found in outer disks, as shown in NGC 4314 (see photo).

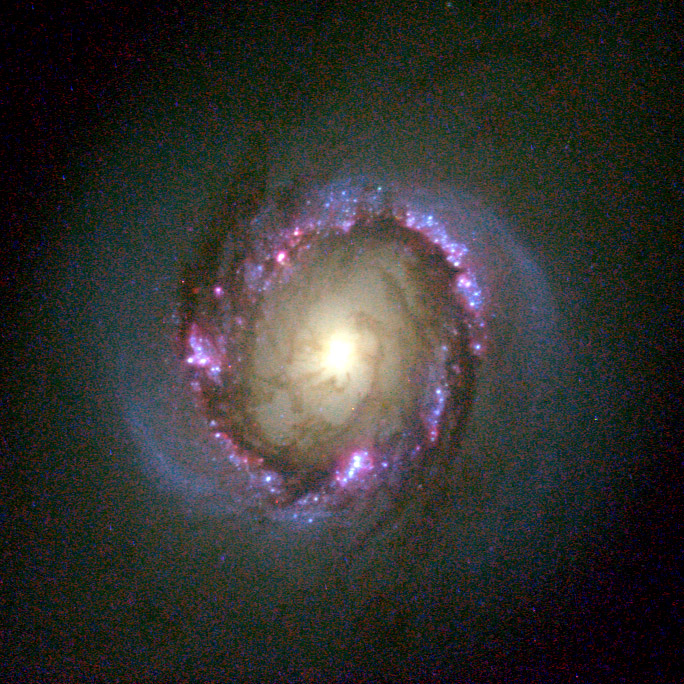
Central region of NGC 4314, a galaxy with a star-forming nuclear ring

Properties such as spiral structure and young stars suggest that some bulges did not form through the same process that made elliptical galaxies and classical bulges. Yet the theories for the formation of pseudobulges are less certain than those for classical bulges. Pseudobulges may be the result of extremely gas-rich mergers that happened more recently than those mergers that formed classical bulges (within the last 5 billion years). However, it is difficult for disks to survive the merging process, casting doubt on this scenario.

Many astronomers suggest that bulges that appear similar to disks form outside of the disk, and are not the product of a merging process. When left alone, disk galaxies can rearrange their stars and gas (as a response to instabilities). The products of this process (called secular evolution) are often observed in such galaxies; both spiral disks and galactic bars can result from secular evolution of galaxy disks. Secular evolution is also expected to send gas and stars to the center of a galaxy. If this happens that would increase the density at the center of the galaxy, and thus make a bulge that has properties similar to those of disk galaxies.

If secular evolution, or the slow, steady evolution of a galaxy, is responsible for the formation of a significant number of bulges, then that many galaxies have not experienced a merger since the formation of their disk. This would then mean that current theories of galaxy formation and evolution greatly over-predict the number of mergers in the past few billion years.

== Boxy/peanut bulge ==
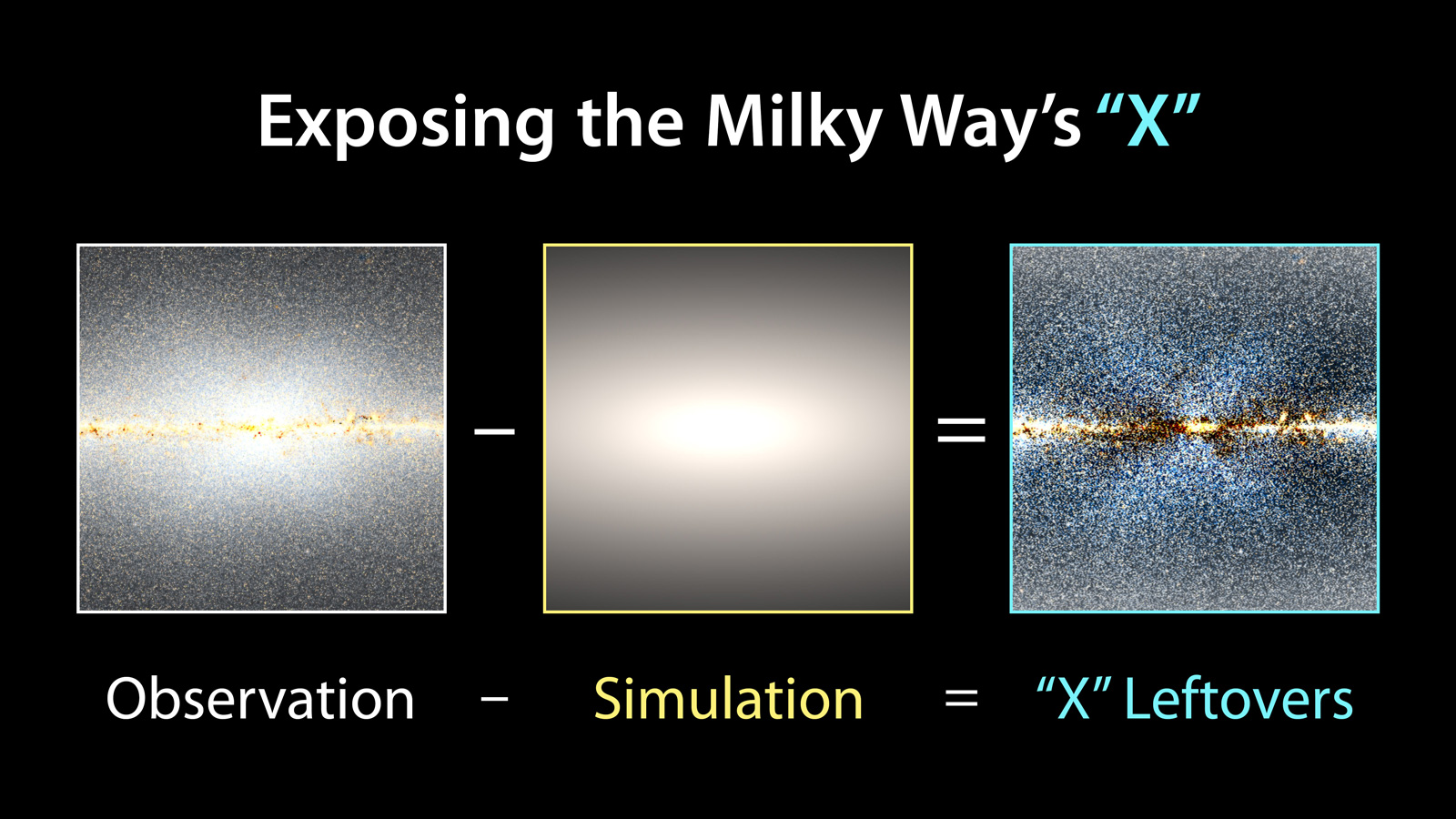
The X-shape of the bulge of the Milky Way.

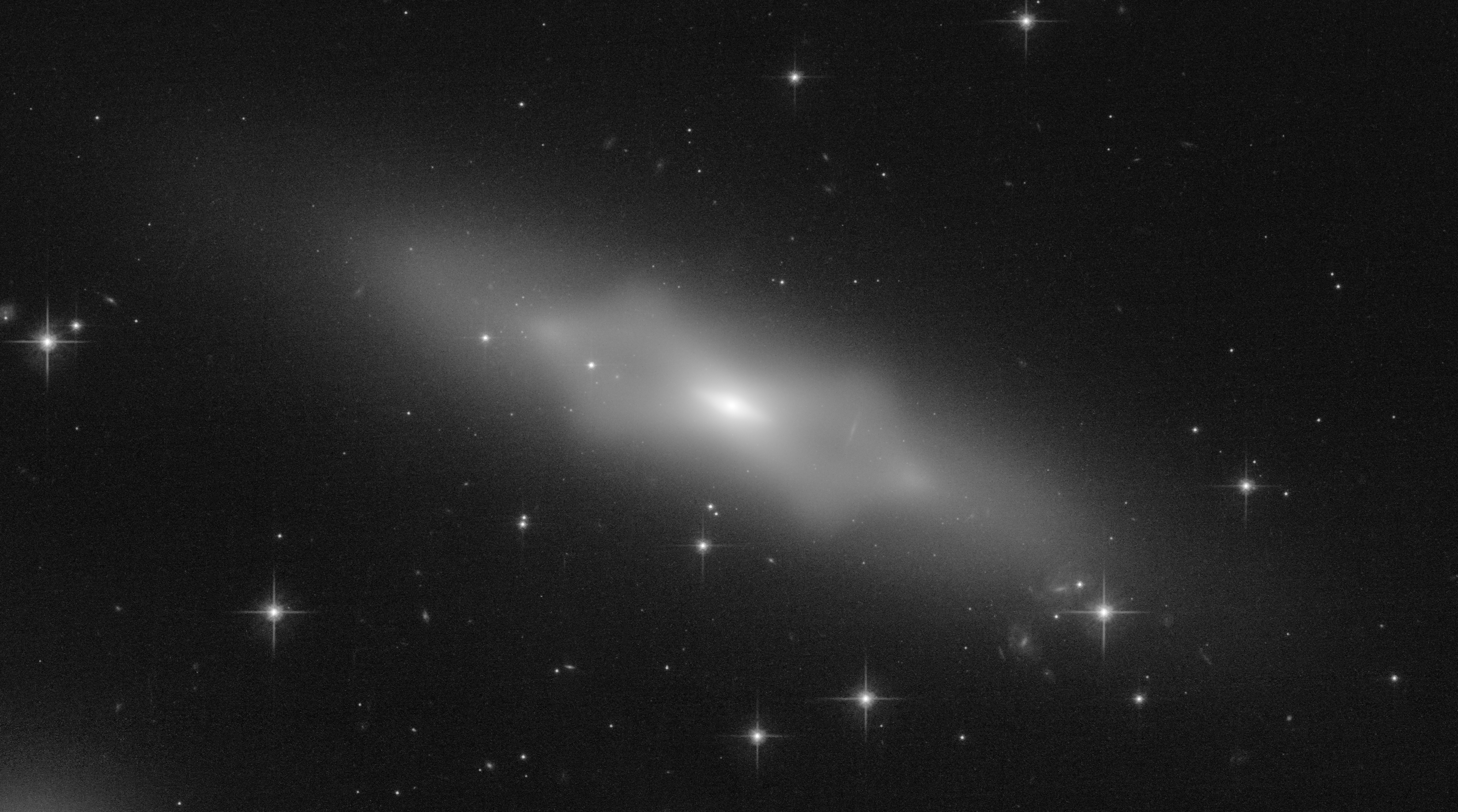
The prominent X-shape of the bulge of NGC 1175 as seen by Hubble.

Some edge-on galaxy bulges resemble an X or figure-eight, suggestive of a "boxy" or "peanut" three-dimensional shape. The Milky Way is such a galaxy, as revealed by the COBE satellite and later confirmed with the VVV survey with the help of red clump stars. The VVV survey also found two overlapping populations of red clump stars and an X-shape of the bulge. The WISE satellite later confirmed the X-shape of the bulge. The X-shape makes up 45% of the mass of the bulge in the Milky Way. However, Mira variables inside Milky Way bulge does not fit well with X-shape bulge model. The boxy/peanut bulges are in fact the bar of a galaxy seen edge-on. Other edge-on galaxies can also show a boxy/peanut bar sometimes with an X-shape.

== Central compact mass ==
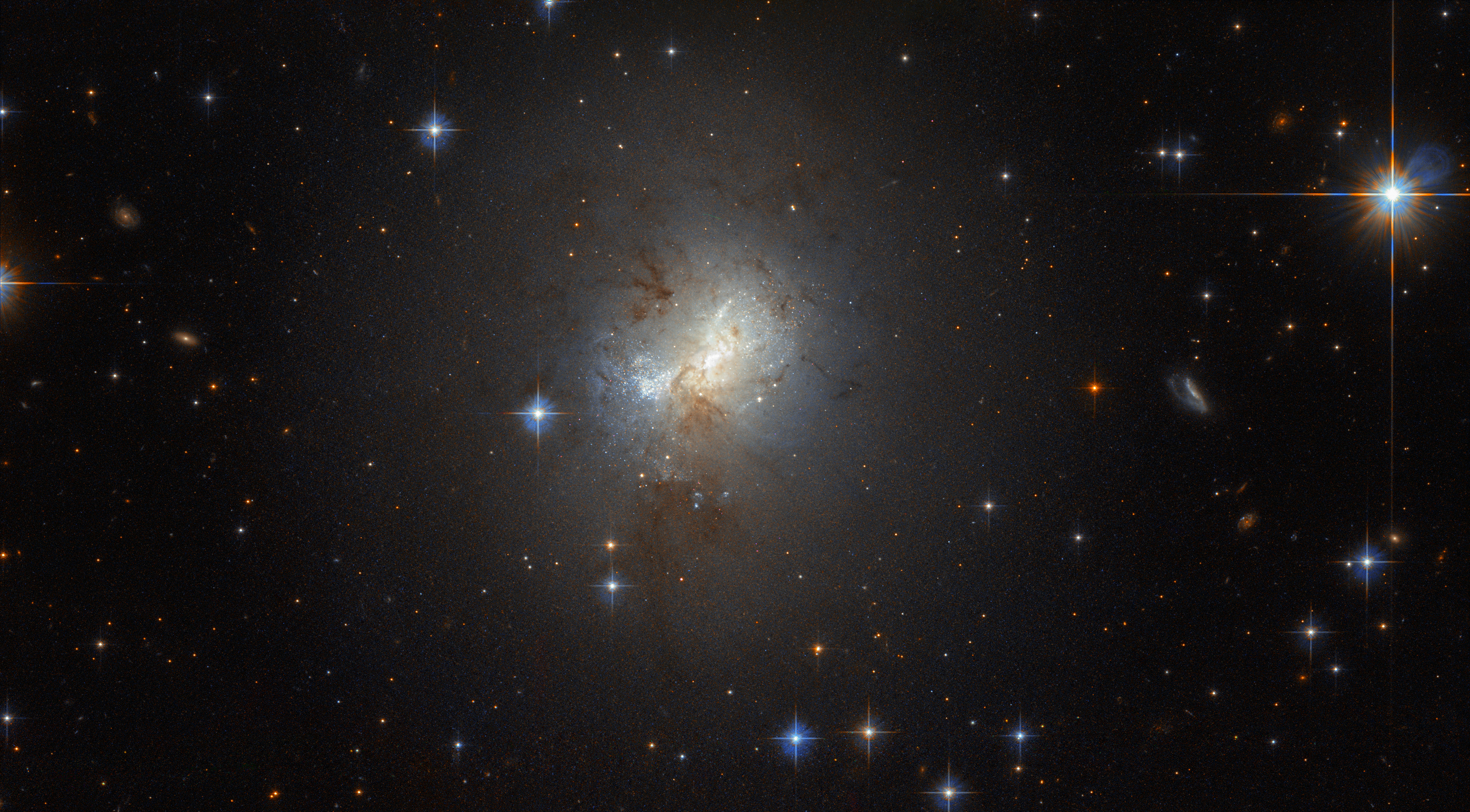
ESO 495-21 may host a supermassive black hole, an unusual feature for a galaxy of its size.

Most bulges and pseudo-bulges are thought to host a central relativistic compact mass, which is traditionally assumed to be a supermassive black hole. Such black holes by definition cannot be observed directly (light cannot escape them), but various pieces of evidence suggest their existence, both in the bulges of spiral galaxies and in the centers of ellipticals. The masses of the black holes correlate tightly with bulge properties. The M–sigma relation relates black hole mass to the velocity dispersion of bulge stars, while other correlations involve the total stellar mass or luminosity of the bulge, the central concentration of stars in the bulge, the richness of the globular cluster system orbiting in the galaxy's far outskirts, and the winding angle of the spiral arms. Stars with low Metallicity below -1 have shown velocity distribution, and stars with high metallicity above -0.4 rotate like galactic bar, anything in between are the mix of both.

Until recently it was thought that one could not have a supermassive black hole without a surrounding bulge. Galaxies hosting supermassive black holes without accompanying bulges have now been observed. The implication is that the bulge environment is not strictly essential to the initial seeding and growth of massive black holes.

== See also ==
- Disc galaxy – Type of galactic form
- Spiral galaxy – Class of galaxy that has spiral structures extending from their cores
- Galactic coordinate system – Celestial coordinate system in spherical coordinates, with the Sun as its center
- Galactic halo – Spherical component of a galaxy
- Galactic corona – Hot, ionised, gaseous component of a galactic halo
- Galaxy formation and evolution – Subfield of cosmology
- Mass deficit – Lack of stellar mass in the centers of galaxies
- M–sigma relation – Concept in astronomy
