= Sérsic profile =

Mathematical function

The Sérsic profile (or Sérsic model or Sérsic's law) is a mathematical function that describes how the intensity $I$ of a galaxy varies with distance $R$ from its center. It is a generalization of de Vaucouleurs' law. José Luis Sérsic first published his law in 1963.

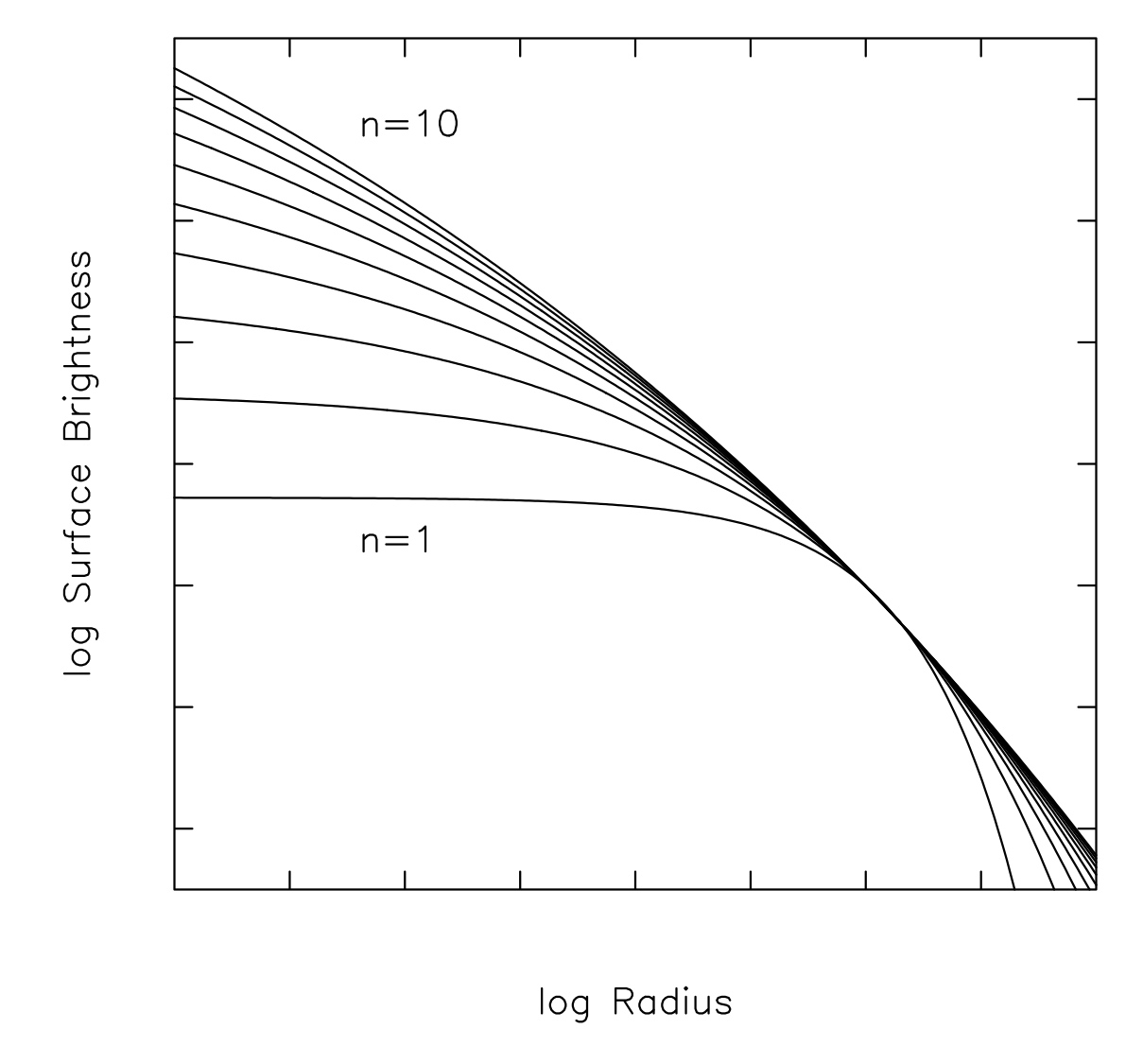
Sérsic models with different indices $n$. The order of $n$ is reversed for large radii.

== Definition ==
The Sérsic profile has the form
$$\ln I(R) = \ln I_{0} - k R^{1/n} ,$$
or
$$I(R) = I_0 \exp{\!\left(-k R^{1/n}\right)},$$

where $I_{0}$ is the intensity at $R = 0$. The parameter $n$, called the "Sérsic index," controls the degree of curvature of the profile (see figure). The smaller the value of $n$, the less centrally concentrated the profile is and the shallower (steeper) the logarithmic slope at small (large) radii is. The equation for describing this is:
$$\frac{\mathrm{d} \ln I}{\mathrm{d} \ln R} = -(k/n)\ R^{1/n} .$$

Today, it is more common to write this function in terms of the half-light radius, R_{e}, and the intensity at that radius, I_{e}, such that

$$I(R)=I_e \exp\left\{ -b_n\left[ \left( \frac{R}{R_e}\right) ^{1/n} -1\right] \right\},$$

where $b_n$ is approximately $2n-1/3$ for $n>8$. $b_n$ can also be approximated to be $2n - 1/3 + \frac{4}{405 n} + \frac{46}{25515 n^2} + \frac{131}{1148175 n^3} - \frac{2194697}{30690717750 n^4}$, for $n > 0.36$. It can be shown that $b_n$ satisfies $\gamma(2n; b_n) = \frac{1}{2} \Gamma(2n)$, where $\Gamma$ and $\gamma$ are respectively the Gamma function and lower incomplete Gamma function. Many related expressions, in terms of the surface brightness, also exist.

== Applications ==
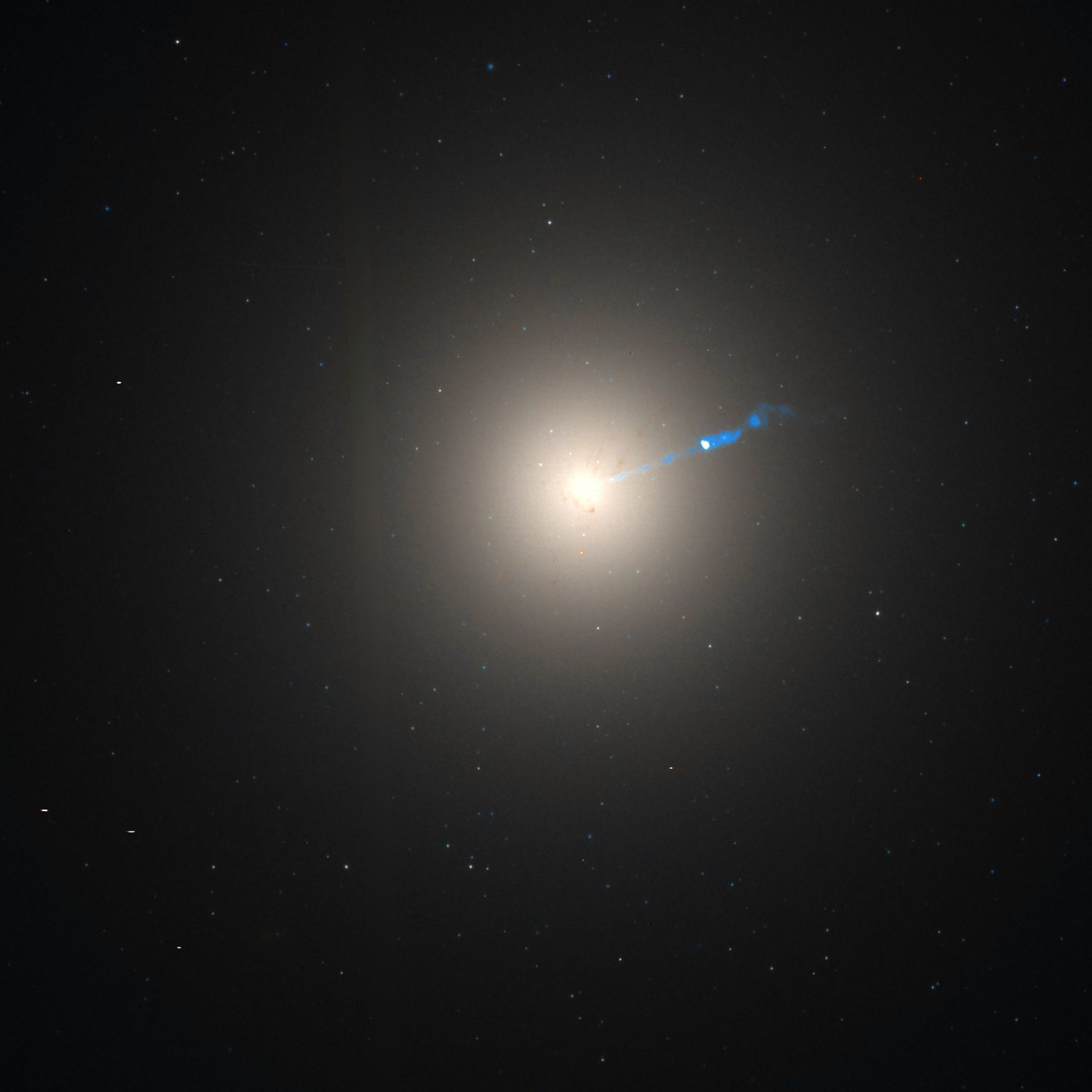
Massive elliptical galaxies have high Sérsic indices and a high degree of central concentration. This galaxy, M87, has a Sérsic index n~ 4.

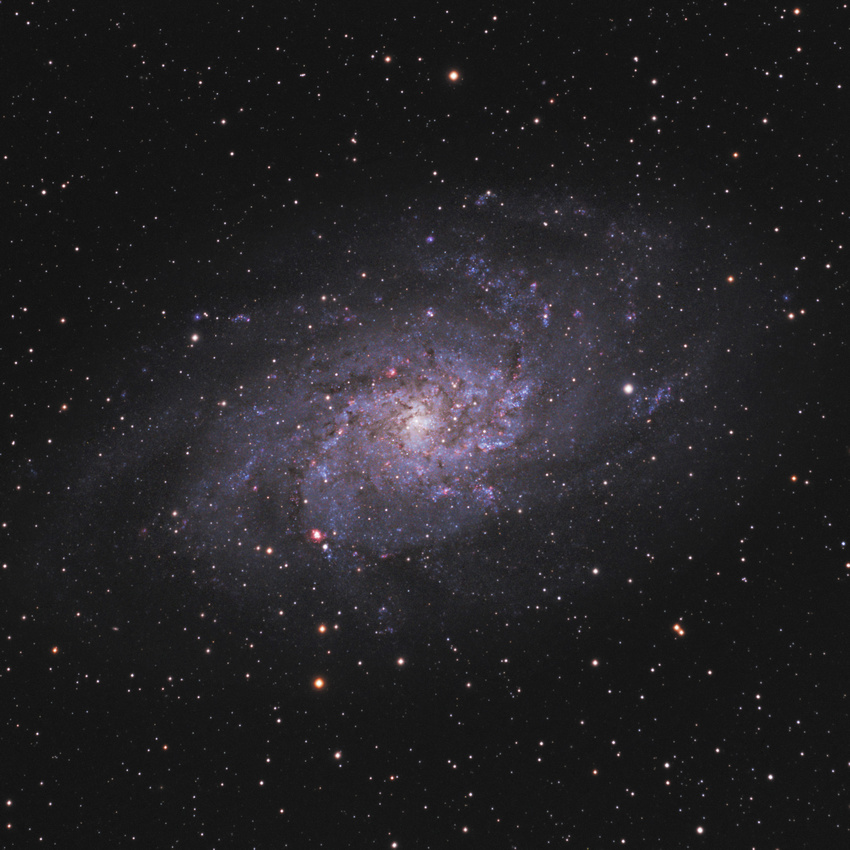
Discs of spiral galaxies, such as the Triangulum Galaxy, have low Sérsic indices and a low degree of central concentration.

Most galaxies are fit by Sérsic profiles with indices in the range 1/2 < n < 10. The best-fit value of n correlates with galaxy size and luminosity, such that bigger and brighter galaxies tend to be fit with larger n. Setting n = 4 gives the de Vaucouleurs profile:
$$I(R) \propto e^{-bR^{1/4}}$$
which is a rough approximation of ordinary elliptical galaxies. Setting n = 1 gives the exponential profile:
$$I(R) \propto e^{-bR}$$
which is a good approximation of spiral galaxy disks and a rough approximation of dwarf elliptical galaxies. The correlation of Sérsic index (i.e. galaxy concentration) with galaxy morphology is sometimes used in automated schemes to determine the Hubble type of distant galaxies. Sérsic indices have also been shown to correlate with the mass of the supermassive black hole at the centers of the galaxies.

Sérsic profiles can also be used to describe dark matter halos, where the Sérsic index correlates with halo mass.

== Generalizations of the Sérsic profile ==
The brightest elliptical galaxies often have low-density cores that are not well described by Sérsic's law. The core-Sérsic family of models was introduced to describe such galaxies. Core-Sérsic models have an additional set of parameters that describe the core.

Dwarf elliptical galaxies and bulges often have point-like nuclei that are also not well described by Sérsic's law. These galaxies are often fit by a Sérsic model with an added central component representing the nucleus.

The Einasto profile is mathematically identical to the Sérsic profile, except that $I$ is replaced by $\rho$, the volume density, and $R$ is replaced by $r$, the internal (not projected on the sky) distance from the center.

== See also ==
- Elliptical galaxy
- Galactic bulge
