= Galaxy effective radius =

Radius which encloses 50% of the total light of a galaxy

Half light radius R_{e} encloses half of the total light emitted by an object

Galaxy effective radius or half-light radius ($R_e$) is the radius at which half of the total light of a galaxy is emitted. This assumes the galaxy has either intrinsic spherical symmetry or is at least circularly symmetric as viewed in the plane of the sky. Alternatively, a half-light contour, or isophote, may be used for spherically and circularly asymmetric objects.

$R_e$ is an important length scale in $\sqrt[4] R$ term in de Vaucouleurs's law, which characterizes a specific rate at which surface brightness decreases as a function of radius:
$$I(R) = I_e \cdot e^{-7.67 \left( \sqrt[4]{ R/ {R_e}} - 1 \right)}$$
where $I_e$ is the surface brightness at $R = R_e$. At $R = 0$,
$$I(R=0) = I_e \cdot e^{7.67} \approx 2000 \cdot I_e$$

Thus, the central surface brightness is approximately $2000 \cdot I_e$.

== See also ==
- Airy disk
- Elliptical galaxy
- Globular cluster
- Open cluster
- Point spread function
- Sérsic profile
