= De Vaucouleurs's law =

Surface brightness model in astronomy

de Vaucouleurs's law (also known as the de Vaucouleurs profile or the de Vaucouleurs model) is a mathematical function that describes how the surface brightness of an elliptical galaxy varies as a function of apparent distance from the center of the galaxy. The model is named after Gérard de Vaucouleurs who first formulated it in 1948. Other notable density profiles which approximately reproduce de Vaucouleurs's law include the Jaffe profile and the Dehnen profile.

== Definition ==
de Vaucouleurs's law is a special case of the Sérsic profile, with an index of $n=4$, and has the functional form
$$\ln I(R) = \ln I_{0} - k R^{1/4},$$
or
$$I(R) = I_0 \exp{\!\left(-k R^{1/4}\right)},$$
where $I_{0}$ is the intensity at $R = 0$. Defining $R_e$ as the half-light radius (the isophote containing half of the galaxy's total luminosity), the de Vaucoulers profile may also be expressed as
$$I(R) = I_0 \exp \left( -7.66925 \left[ \left( \frac{R}{R_e}\right)^{1/4} -1\right] \right)$$
where the intensity at $R_e$ is defined as $I_e = I(0) \exp(-7.66925)$. This can be confirmed by noting that
$$\int^{R_e}_0 I(r)2\pi r \, dr = \frac{1}{2} \int^{\infty}_0 I(r)2\pi r \, dr  .$$
holds in general.

== Applications ==
de Vaucouleurs's law has multiple applications in galactic astrophysics. It is primarily used for the modeling the surface brightness of elliptical galaxies and galactic bulges, where it may be used as a tool in bulge-disk decompositions. de Vaucouleurs profiles may also be mathematically de-projected to yield expressions for mass distributions, gravitational potentials, and internal stellar velocity dispersions, which may be used in dynamical modeling. Notably, however, though the de Vaucouleurs profile fits many elliptical galaxies very well, the specific Sérsic index of $n=4$ likely does not hold significant physical significance as many elliptical galaxies are also well-fit by Sérsic profiles of index $3<n<10$. As a result, recent galaxy light profile modeling studies employ the more general Sérsic profile as the de Vaucouleurs profile may introduce systematic errors under certain conditions.
