= CfA 1.2 m Millimeter-Wave Telescope =

Radio telescope in Massachusetts, US

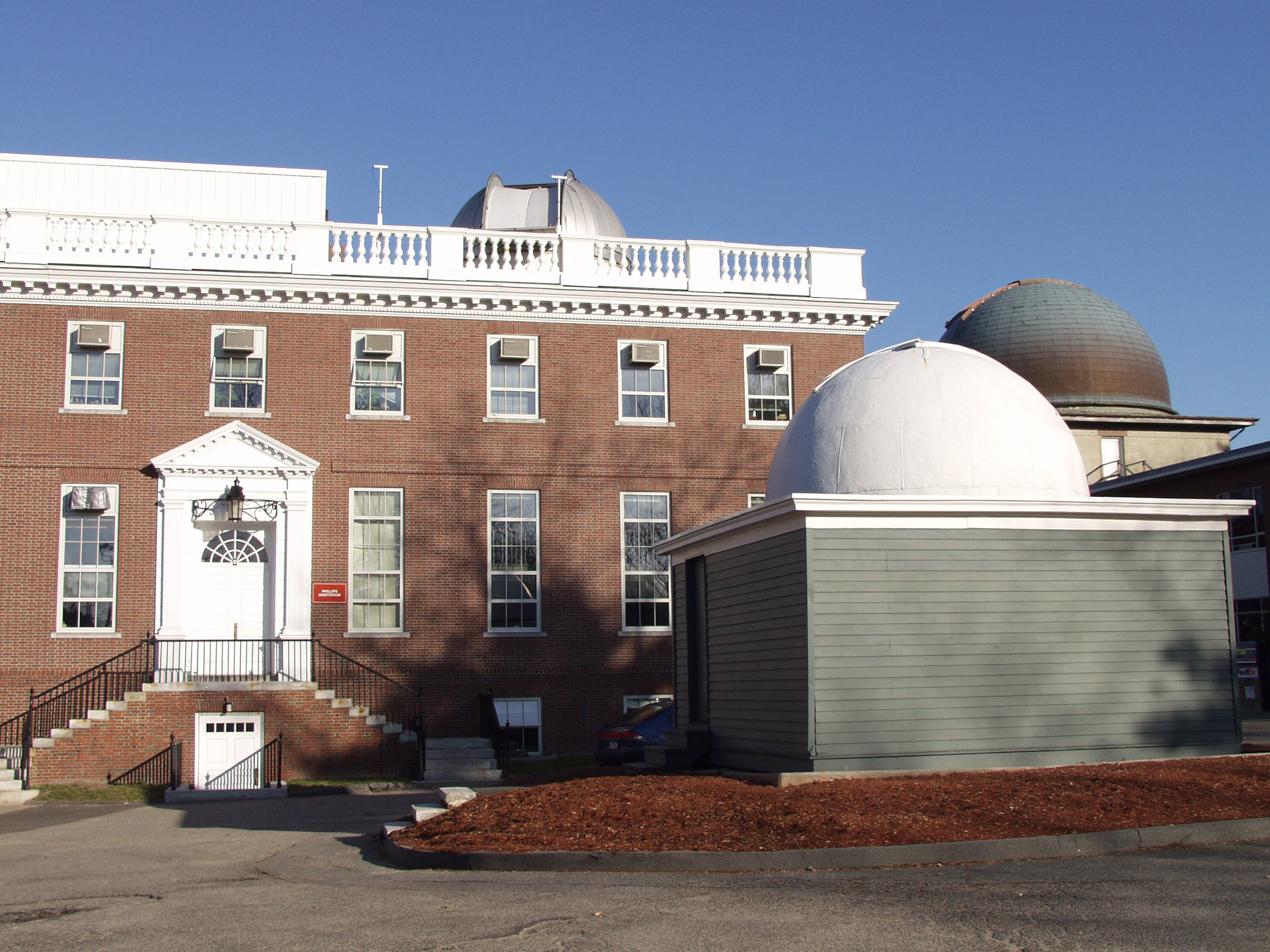
- The 1.2m telescope can be seen on the roof of Building D of the Harvard–Smithsonian Center for Astrophysics.
- Location: United States
- Coordinates: 42°22′54″N 71°07′43″W
- Wavelength: 115 GHz (2.6 mm)
- Diameter: 1.2 m (3 ft 11 in)
- Secondary diameter: 0.178 m (7.0 in)
- Enclosure: dome
- Website: www.cfa.harvard.edu/mmw/mini.html
- Location within the United States

- Stephen S. Hall, Mapping the Next Millennium

The 1.2 meter Millimeter-Wave Telescope at the Center for Astrophysics | Harvard & Smithsonian and its twin instrument originally at CTIO in Chile and currently at the National Astronomical Observatory in Cerro Calán have been studying the distribution and properties of molecular clouds in our galaxy and its nearest neighbours since the 1970s. The telescope is nicknamed "The Mini" because of its unusually small size. At the time it was built, it was the smallest radio telescope in the world. Together, "The Mini" and its twin in Chile have obtained what is by far the most extensive, uniform, and widely used galactic survey of interstellar carbon monoxide. "The Mini" is currently in operation from October to May each year.

In the early 1970s, an astronomer at the Goddard Institute of Space Studies in New York named Patrick Thaddeus shattered centuries of precedent in the field of astronomy and bucked a trend dating back to Galileo when he decided that, in order to proceed on a modest project to map the entire Milky Way, he simply did not need and in fact refused to use a larger telescope made available for his research. He wanted a small one. In an era made conspicuous by bigger, more sophisticated, and more expensive telescopes, Thaddeus insisted on a small and relatively inexpensive instrument, which he and his colleagues proceeded to build from scratch.

== Purpose ==
You can't see a nucleic acid or protein within a cell, so you have to use a drop of dye to bring out the structure. Well, in the densest star-forming regions, we're caught in a similar situation. We can't see the dominant molecule—molecular hydrogen—either.
—Patrick Thaddeus, quoted in Thursday's Universe by Marcia Bartusiak

Interstellar carbon monoxide is the best general tracer of the largely invisible molecular hydrogen that constitutes most of the mass in molecular clouds. Hydrogen is the simplest and most abundant element in the universe, and molecular hydrogen is by far the most abundant molecule. Unfortunately, under typical interstellar conditions molecular hydrogen does not emit at radio or millimeter wavelengths.

Carbon monoxide, however, the second most abundant ingredient in molecular clouds, has a rich and strong millimeter-wave spectrum and it seems to maintain a fairly constant ratio with molecular hydrogen of about 1:100,000. For this reason, carbon monoxide has become the standard tracer or "stain" for the invisible molecular hydrogen which constitutes most of the molecular mass.

== Achievements ==
A total of 24 PhD dissertations have so far been written based on observations or instrumental work with these telescopes.

The 1.2 meter telescope has played an important or dominant role in all of the important general findings on molecular clouds (MCs) listed below. Many of these are now considered conventional wisdom but some were originally controversial (e.g., the very existence of giant molecular clouds, their ages, and their confinement to spiral arms).

- 1977: Carbon monoxide is the best general-purpose tracer of molecular cloud mass.
- 1977: Galactic carbon monoxide emission peaks in a broad "molecular ring" at R~4 kpc.
- 1977/1994: Molecular clouds are mainly confined to a thin Gaussian layer ~100 pc wide, but a faint layer ~3 times as wide also exists.
- 1980/1983: Molecular clouds are excellent tracers of galactic spiral structure.
- 1980: Molecular clouds are relatively short-lived galactic objects.
- 1982/1983: The molecular cloud mass spectrum is steep, with most of the mass in the largest clouds.
- 1983: Intercomparision of carbon monoxide, HI, and diffuse gamma ray emissions provides perhaps the best large-scale calibration of carbon monoxide as a molecular mass tracer. The term X-factor was coined in this paper.
- 1985/1989/1991: Molecular clouds are dark nebulae both in the optical and the near infrared.
- 1986: Giant molecular complexes containing more than a million solar masses are not kinematic artifacts—as some had argued—but are well-defined objects that can be readily located throughout the galaxy.
- 1988: Roughly half of the interstellar gas within the solar circle is molecular.
- 2008: The enigmatic Expanding 3-kpc Arm has a Far 3 kpc symmetric counterpart on the far side of the Galactic Center.
- 2011: The Scutum–Centaurus spiral arm extends almost 360 degrees around the galaxy, from the end of the central bar to the warp near its outer edge.

The Milky Way in different tracers. Fourth from the top is the distribution of H_{2}, derived from carbon monoxide(1–0) observations made with the CfA 1.2 m Millimeter-Wave Telescope

== Personnel ==
Prof. Patrick Thaddeus (the Robert Wheeler Willson Professor of Applied Astronomy, Emeritus, Harvard University; Senior Space Scientist, Smithsonian Astrophysical Observatory), who was leading the Millimeter-Wave group, died on April 28, 2017. Tom Dame (Radio Astronomer, Smithsonian Astrophysical Observatory; Lecturer on Astronomy, Harvard University) has coordinated telescope observations over the last decade. Sam Palmer (Electronics Engineer, Smithsonian Astrophysical Observatory; Lecturer on Astronomy, Harvard University) continues to maintain the telescope hardware.

== History ==
Comparing and combining data from radio telescopes is generally difficult because of differences in resolution, sensitivity, and calibration. But the twin minis provide an unprecedented opportunity to produce uniform superbeam maps of the entire Milky Way, and, eventually, of the entire sky. . . .Without the superbeam technique, the twin minis would have required several decades to map such a large area. Two telescopes with 1-arc-minute beams (like the antenna at Kitt Peak) could barely complete the job in two centuries.
Tom Dame, Sky & Telescope

Built by Thaddeus and colleagues in 1974, the telescope was operated from a Columbia University rooftop in Manhattan until it was moved to the CfA in 1986. Its twin instrument was constructed at Columbia and shipped to Cerro Tololo Inter-American Observatory, Chile in 1982.

Observations of carbon monoxide had revealed that molecular gas in space was much more extensive than ever suspected. Initially, Thaddeus and his colleagues, Ken Tucker and Marc Kutner, had originally begun mapping the carbon monoxide using the sixteen-foot radio telescope at the McDonald Observatory in western Texas. The plan was to keep mapping outward from the clouds they were observing (the Orion Nebula and the Horsehead Nebula) until they found a place where there was no more carbon monoxide. They soon discovered that there was so much to be mapped that to do it with that size telescope would take many years. That large telescope could look at only a small area of the sky with each observation.

Thaddeus and his colleagues designed a radio telescope custom-built for the task of mapping the entire galaxy in carbon monoxide. The "Mini" was designed with a relatively small dish and consequently a relatively large beamwidth of about 1/8 degree, which can be likened to a wide-angle lens. With this new instrument, it suddenly became possible to map large stretches of sky in relatively small amounts of time.

Over the course of the next several years, a remarkable network of molecular clouds and filaments was uncovered, extending much further away from the Orion Nebula than expected. So large was the area covered, in fact, that Thaddeus and Dame (who had since joined the Columbia group) wished that they had an even smaller telescope, one which could quickly show them the big picture. Instead of building a smaller telescope, however, they decided to make a relatively simple change in the mini's control program. Rather than pointing at a single spot on the sky, they had the telescope antenna step through a square array of sixteen points on a 4 x 4 grid. In effect, this allowed the mini to mimic a smaller antenna with a half-degree beam. Because it is impossible to view the entire galaxy from New York, they also built an identical twin of the mini, which was shipped to Cerro Tololo, Chile to observe the southern sky.

After a decade of mapping using the superbeam technique, Dame and Thaddeus had created the first complete map of the galaxy in CO, covering more than 7,700 square degrees (nearly one-fifth of the sky) and representing more than 31,000 individual observations. The mapping revealed the distribution of molecular gas not only on the plane of the sky, but also in radial velocity. The large spread of observed velocities result mainly from the differential rotation of the galaxy.

== Current research ==
Over the past few years a major goal of the 1.2 meter telescope has been completion of a survey of the entire northern sky lying outside the sampling boundary of the composite carbon monoxide survey of Dame et al. (2001). As of June 2013 this survey is nearly complete, consisting of over 375,000 spectra and covering ~24,000 sq-deg with 1/4° sampling. In addition, all molecular clouds at |b| > 10° and dec > −15° (~248) have been mapped every beamwidth.

In 2011, Dame and Thaddeus found clear evidence in existing 21 cm surveys for a large extension of the Scutum-Centaurus Arm, one of the two major spiral arms thought to extend from the ends of the galactic bar. The "Outer Sct-Cen arm" lies well beyond the solar orbit on the far side of the galaxy, roughly 21 kpc from the Sun. The CfA 1.2 m telescope has so far detected 22 distinct giant molecular clouds associated with HI peaks in the arm, and a large, unbiased carbon monoxide survey of the entire arm was begun in the fall of 2013; it is expected to require ~2 years to complete.

== Technical information ==
=== Antenna ===
The antenna system consists of a 1.2 m parabolic primary and 17.8 cm hyperbolic secondary in a Cassegrain configuration with effective f/D=2.8. The antenna primary is a monolithic aluminum casting with f/D=0.375, numerically milled by Philco Ford to 40 μm surface accuracy (l/65 at 115 GHz). The telescope's focus, beam pattern, and main beamwidth were most recently measured and adjusted in the fall of 1994 using a transmitter in the intermediate field (1.4 km distant on the roof of Harvard's William James Hall). The beam pattern matches well the predictions of scalar diffraction theory. The beamwidth (FWHM) is 8.4+/-0.2 arcmin and the main beam efficiency 82%.

The antenna is housed in a 16 ft Ash dome with a 75 in slit. During normal observations, the slit is covered with a screen of woven PTFE (polytetrafluoroethylene—Teflon), selected for its near transparency to microwaves, its strength, and its resistance to aging. The screen keeps the wind out of the dome and makes possible regulation of the temperature inside. LO reflections from the PTFE screen were found to be the source of occasional standing waves in scan baselines; subsequent modification of the mounting plates at the bottom and top of the screen gave it a "V" shape, eliminating surfaces of constant phase for the reflected LO and solving the standing wave problem.

=== Mount and drive ===
The telescope mount and drive systems are essentially unchanged from their configurations at Columbia. Because the telescope is small, direct-drive torque motors are used on both axes, with the advantage that the drive system has no gear trains. Although the motors provide only 11 pound force-feet (15 N⋅m) of torque, the telescope can change orientation at 10 degrees per second. Both axes are monitored by 16 bit shaft encoders and tachometers read at 100 Hz by the telescope-control computer to calculate torque corrections for pointing.

The pointing of the telescope is fine tuned at the beginning of each season by using a coaligned optical telescope to observe a large number of stars covering a wide range of azimuths and elevations. A least-squares fit to the pointing errors is used to define 5 pointing parameters (offsets of the azimuth and elevation encoders, effective longitude and latitude, and the small nonperpendicularity of the azimuth and elevation axes). Because the relatively large beam of the telescope makes continuum observations of planets inconvenient, pointing is checked weekly by radio continuum observations of the limb of the Sun. Although during the observing season (fall, winter, and spring) the Sun transits below the elevation of most carbon monoxide observations, it is the only practical astronomical source for pointing checks. At elevations used for observations, the root mean square pointing errors of the telescope were less than about 1', about 1/9 beamwidth.

=== Receiver ===
The heterodyne receiver, which uses a superconducting-insulator-superconducting (SIS) Josephson junction as the mixer, is the two-backshort design of Kerr (Pan et al. 1983). A scalar feed couples the microwave signal to the receiver, where it is mixed with a local oscillator (LO) signal to produce a 1.4 GHz intermediate frequency (IF) signal that is further amplified with a low-noise high electron mobility field effect transistor (HEMT FET) amplifier, and passed to the IF section of the receiver. The IF section further amplifies the signal and heterodynes it down to 150 MHz, passing a bandwidth of 200 MHz to the spectrometer.

The LO signal is generated by a Gunn diode oscillator whose frequency is controlled via a phase-lock loop system by a computer-controlled frequency synthesizer. The SIS mixer and the FET first stage amplifier are on the liquid helium-cooled cold stage of a vacuum dewar; the rest of the electronics are room temperature. Typical receiver noise temperatures at 115.3 GHz are 65–70 K single sideband (SSB). Although the performance improves somewhat to 55 K SSB if the helium dewar is pumped to 2.7 K, it is not standard observing procedure, because the sky noise at 115 GHz dominates at this level of receiver performance. On the best dry, cold days the total system temperatures are less than 350 K SSB, referred to above the atmosphere.

=== Spectrometer ===
The telescope has two software-selectable filter banks of a modified NRAO design, each containing 256 channels. At 115 GHz, the 0.5 MHz per channel filter bank provides a velocity resolution of 1.3 km/s, and velocity coverage of 333 km/s, and the resolution and coverage of the 0.25 MHz per channel filter bank are 0.65 and 166 km/s, respectively. The spectrometers divide the 150 MHz final IF signal from the receiver into 16 bands of 4 or 8 MHz width, each centered on 8 MHz. The 16 bands are passed to an equal number of filter boards, each with 16 contiguous two-pole Butterworth filters of 0.25 or 0.5 MHz width. The outputs of the filters are passed to square law detectors. After amplification, the detected signals are accumulated in integrators. The sampling time is 48 ms, followed by a 5 ms hold for sequential read-out by an analog-to-digital converter, after which the integrators are cleared for the next cycle. The 256 values produced by the converter are stored in a buffer during the following cycle, allowing the computer a full 48 ms to read the data.

=== Computer system ===
Prior to January 1991, pointing, data taking, and calibration of the radio telescope were controlled by a Data General Nova minicomputer ( picture ) running a custom telescope-control system. The control computer was fairly limited in speed and memory (having only 32 K byte of random access memory and 5 M byte of fixed disk storage), but it was fast enough to allow limited data reduction on-line. For further processing, all scans were transferred via 1600 bpi 9-track magnetic tape to a Digital Equipment VAXstation II/GPX workstation.

In January 1991, the telescope-control functions were transferred to a Macintosh IIfx computer, running a translated and improved version of the telescope-control system written in C. Individual scans or more commonly concatenated files containing large numbers of scans can be obtained from the control computer directly over the Internet. Generally the data is analyzed as FITS-format "cubes" of galactic longitude, latitude, and velocity. Such cubes can be built from the raw scan files either using custom Macintosh software or on Unix workstations with IDL or CLASS.

=== Calibration and observing techniques ===
The receiver noise temperature is calibrated at the start of every observing shift by measuring the difference in receiver response to ambient temperature and liquid nitrogen temperature loads. The loads are made of Eccosorb, a carbon-impregnated foam highly absorbent to microwaves and cone-shaped to prevent direct reflection of LO back to the feed.

Carbon monoxide line intensities are calibrated using the room-temperature chopper wheel method and the two-layer atmosphere model of Kutner (1978). At the carbon monoxide signal frequency the atmospheric opacity is appreciable, mostly due to molecular oxygen and water vapor, and corrections to the observed line intensities for signal attenuation must be applied. Kutner's two-layer model of the atmosphere parameterizes the elevation dependence of the correction factor in terms of only 3 parameters, each of which has a physical interpretation. Because oxygen has a much greater scale height than water vapor, the model assumes they can be considered separate layers, oxygen above water, with different characteristic temperatures and opacities. The temperature and opacity of oxygen in the upper atmosphere do not vary much seasonally and are assumed to be constant at 255 K and 0.378, respectively, at the signal frequency. The remaining parameters in the model, the temperature and opacity of water and the fraction of the received power from the sky, are determined through antenna tippings (measurements of the intensity of the sky signal as a function of elevation) at least once per six-hour observing shift, and more frequently if the weather is changing. Typical zenith water opacities ranged from 0.10 to 0.15, with values as low as about 0.05 in the coldest, driest weather. A 1-second calibration is performed at the start of each scan to correct for short term variations of the receiver gain and atmospheric opacity.

The observing season for the 1.2 m telescope, like other millimeter-wave telescopes at temperate northern latitudes, generally runs from October to May, with the best conditions in November through March. Cold, dry days afford the best observations, because of the decreased atmospheric opacity due to water vapor and the colder sky in general. Overall, the weather permits operation of the telescope roughly half of the time between October and May.

To obtain flat spectral baselines close to the galactic plane where emission typically covers a large range in velocity, spectra were acquired by position switching every 15 s between the source position (ON) and two emission-free reference positions (OFFs) selected by the telescope control program to straddle the ON in elevation. The fraction of the time spent on each OFF was adjusted so that the time-weighted average system temperature at the OFFs was equal to that at the ON, resulting in baselines that were flat, and residual offsets that were typically less than 1 K. This offset was generally removed by simply fitting a straight line to the emission-free ends of the spectrum.

Away from the plane in those regions where only one or two relatively narrow carbon monoxide lines are found, frequency-switching by 10–20 MHz at a rate of 1 Hz was often used instead of position switching. Since spectral lines remain within the range of the spectrometer in both phases of the switching cycle, data could be obtained twice as fast as with position switching, although higher order polynomials, typically 4th or 5th order, were required to remove the residual baseline. A telluric emission line from carbon monoxide in the mesosphere, variable in both intensity and LSR velocity, is detected in frequency-switched spectra; because the LSR velocity of the line could be predicted exactly, blending with galactic emission could be avoided by appropriate scheduling of the observations. In a few cases of large surveys (e.g., Taurus and Orion) a model of the telluric line was fit daily to spectra free of galactic emission and used to remove the line from all spectra.
