= X Factor (disambiguation) =

The X Factor is a TV music competition with several international variants.

X Factor may also refer to:

== Arts and entertainment ==
- The X Factor (album), by Iron Maiden, 1995
- X-Factor (comics), a group of fictional mutant superheroes
  - X-Factor (comic book), a Marvel Comic book series
- The X Factor, a 1965 book by Andre Norton
- "Ex-Factor", a 1998 song by Lauryn Hill

== Sports ==
- Dante Hall (born 1978), nicknamed the X-factor, American footballer
- X-Factor, or sitout facebuster, a professional wrestling move

== Other uses ==
- X-factor (astrophysics), used to convert CO emission line brightness to molecular hydrogen mass
- X-factor, a gene mutation theory causing abnormally large hearts in horses
- Haemin, considered the "X factor" required for the growth of Haemophilus influenzae

== See also ==
- Factor X (disambiguation)
- The Ex-Factor (disambiguation)
- Variable (mathematics)
