= Patrick Thaddeus =

- Born: June 6, 1932
- Died: April 28, 2017 (aged 84)
- Education: University of Delaware (BS); University of Oxford (MPhil); Columbia University (PhD)
- Known for: CfA 1.2 m Millimeter-Wave Telescope
- Children: Eva; Michael
- Awards: Herschel Medal (2001)
- Scientific career
- Fields: Astronomy
- Workplaces: Harvard University; Columbia University; Goddard Institute for Space Studies
- Thesis: Hyperfine Structure in the Microwave Spectrum of Hydrogen-Deuterium Oxide, Hydrogen-Deuterium Sulfide, Formaldehyde and Formaldehyde-D. Beam Maser Spectroscopy on Asymmetric Top Molecules (1960)
- Doctoral advisor: Charles Hard Townes
- Doctoral students: John Clauser; Tom Dame

Patrick Thaddeus (June 6, 1932 – April 28, 2017) was an American professor and finished his career as the Robert Wheeler Willson Professor of Applied Astronomy Emeritus at Harvard University. He is best known for mapping carbon monoxide in the Milky Way galaxy and was responsible for the construction of the CfA 1.2 m Millimeter-Wave Telescope.

== Early life and education ==
Thaddeus was born on June 6, 1932, to Elizabeth and Victor Thaddeus. His mother divorced Thaddeus when he and his sister, Deirdre, were very young. She later remarried to Vincent Copeland.

He graduated from University of Delaware in 1953 with a Bachelor of Science degree. He was awarded a Fulbright Fellowship through which he attended the University of Oxford, graduating with a master's degree in theoretical physics in 1955. His doctoral work was at Columbia University, where he earned his Ph.D. under Charles Hard Townes in 1960 with a thesis titled Beam Maser Spectroscopy.

== Career ==
After earning his doctorate, Thaddeus stayed at Columbia University as a research associate in the Columbia Radiation Laboratory until 1961, when he took a position working for NASA at the Goddard Institute for Space Studies, where he remained until 1986. He also taught at Columbia University during that period, from 1965 until 1986. It was during his time at Columbia that the CfA 1.2 m Millimeter-Wave Telescope was built. In 1986, Thaddeus (along with the 1.2 meter telescope and other scientists on the team) moved to Harvard, where he remained for the rest of his teaching career and remained Professor Emeritus until his death in April 2017.

Thaddeus held a few other teaching positions during his career at institutions including State University of New York, Stony Brook (1966–1967), University of California, Berkeley (1968), and University of Cambridge (1983–1984).

Thaddeus and his colleagues designed a radio telescope custom-built for the task of mapping the entire Milky Way in carbon monoxide (CO). The 1.2 meter Millimeter-Wave Telescope was designed with a relatively small dish and consequently a relatively large beamwidth of about 1/8 degree, which can be likened to a wide-angle lens. With this new instrument, it suddenly became possible to map large stretches of sky in relatively small amounts of time. The telescope is nicknamed "The Mini" because of its unusually small size. Together, "The Mini" and its twin in Chile have obtained what is by far the most extensive, uniform, and widely used Galactic survey of interstellar carbon monoxide.

Harvard astronomer Tom Dame, in collaboration with Thaddeus, discovered the Far 3 kpc Arm of the Milky Way.

== Personal life ==
Thaddeus married the former Janice Farrar (daughter of John Chipman Farrar and Margaret Petherbridge Farrar) in 1963. Janice Farrar Thaddeus was a scholar, poet, editor, and former Harvard lecturer in English; she died of a stroke in 2001 at the age of 68. They have two children: Eva (b. 1965) and Michael (b. 1967), as well as two grandchildren.

== Publications ==
Thaddeus authored or co-authored more than three hundred research papers and more than twenty invited papers in astronomy and physics.

== Honors and awards ==
- Honorary Doctor of Science, University of Chicago, 2003
- Sir Harold Thompson Memorial Award, 2002
- Herschel Medal, Royal Astronomical Society, 2001
- Fairchild Distinguished Scholar, California Institute of Technology, 1994
- Russell Marker Lecturer, Pennsylvania State University, 1989
- Election to the American Academy of Arts and Sciences, 1989
- Election to the National Academy of Sciences, 1987
- Medal for Exceptional Scientific Achievement, NASA, 1985
- John C. Lindsay Memorial Award, National Aeronautics and Space Administration, Goddard Space Flight Center, 1976
- Medal for Exceptional Scientific Achievement, NASA, 1970
- Postdoctoral Fellowship, National Academy of Sciences, National Research Council, 1961–1964
- Fulbright Fellowship, 1953–1955

== Professional memberships ==
- Fellow, American Physical Society
- American Astronomical Society
- International Astronomical Union
- Sigma Xi
- American Philosophical Society

== Advisory committees ==
"Until the war, astronomy was confined to about an octave, or factor of three, in wavelength, centered on the visual. And what we've done since then is just explode across the whole spectrum, so that now astronomy goes from very, very long radio wavelengths, meters and tens-of-meters long, down to gamma rays. And so to a great degree what we've been doing is just explode into these empty regions of frequency space, and in many ways we're still really just doing the survey work. Finding out what's there, and doing the basic mapping. Every time you go to a new wavelength band, the general rule is that you find a completely different aspect of nature in that information."
Patrick Thaddeus, quoted in Stephen S. Hall's book Mapping the Next Millennium

- NASA Astrobiology Oversight Committee, 1999–2002
- Center for Astrophysical Research in Antarctica (CARA), 1999–
- Chair: Task Group on Space Astronomy and Astrophysics, National Research Council, 1996–97
- President's Visiting Committee, Caltech, 1995
- Visiting Committee, National Radio Astronomy Observatory, 1991–94; Chair 1994
- Steering Committee, SAO Submillimeter Array, 1993–
- Director's Advisory Committee, NRAO Green Bank Telescope Project 1989–90
- Astronomy Survey Committee 1989–90, Radio Astronomy Panel, Infrared Panel, and Theory and Laboratory Astrophysics Panel
- Scientific Organizing Committee, IAU Symposium No. 147, on Fragmentation of Molecular Clouds and Star Formation, Grenoble, 1990
- National Radio Astronomy Observatory Ad Hoc Long–Range Planning Committee, 1988
- NASA Management Operations Working Group for Infrared Astronomy, 1987–1990
- International Organizing Committee, Cologne– Zermatt International Symposium on the Physics and Chemistry of Interstellar Clouds, Zermatt, 1988
- Scientific Committee, Meeting on "Polycyclic Molecules and Astrophysics," Les Houches, 1986
- Visiting Committee, Department of Astronomy and Astrophysics, University of Chicago, 1983
- AURA Visiting Committee (Kitt Peak, Cerro Tololo, and Sacramento Peak Observatories), 1983–86
- NASA Management Operations Working Group for Airborne Astronomy, 1982–1986
- Visiting Committee, Haystack Observatory, Massachusetts Institute of Technology, 1982–85; Chair, 1985
- Scientific Organizing Committee, Symposium on the Orion Nebula to Honor Henry Draper, New York, 1981
- Visiting Committee, Hat Creek Observatory, University of California, 1981
- Universities Research Association (URA), Astronomy Advisory Committee, 1979–81
- NASA Space Science Advisory Committee, 1979
- Astronomy Survey Committee, 1978–80; Chair, Radio Astronomy Panel; report published as Astronomy and Astrophysics for the 1980s (National Academy Press, 1982;2)
- Submillimeter Space Telescope Working Group, 1977
- Editorial Board, The Astrophysical Journal, 1976–80
- Scientific Organizing Committee, IAU Symposium No. 75, on "Star Formation," Geneva, 1976
- Visiting Committee, National Radio Astronomy Observatory, 1973–76
