= Naoko Kurahashi Neilson =

American astrophysicist

Naoko Kurahashi Neilson is an American astrophysicist and neutrino astronomer who works as a professor of physics at Drexel University in Philadelphia, Pennsylvania. Her research focuses on the observation of high-energy neutrinos, especially through the IceCube Neutrino Observatory, and the development of better techniques for localizing the sources of these neutrinos. Her discovery that some of these neutrinos were galactic rather than extra-galactic inspired her to produce a neutrino-based map of the Milky Way.

== Education and career ==
Kurahashi lived in California as a child. She was already determined to become a physicist in elementary school, and majored in physics at the University of California, Berkeley, graduating in 2002. She received a Ph.D. in 2010 from Stanford University, based on research with an acoustic neutrino detector array in the waters of the Bahamas. Her dissertation, Acoustic Detection of Ultra-high Energy Neutrinos, was supervised by Giorgio Gratta and co-advised by Vahé Petrosian.

After postdoctoral research working with IceCube at the University of Wisconsin, she joined Drexel University as an assistant professor in 2014. She was promoted to associate professor in 2019 and full professor in 2024.

== Recognition ==
Neilson was named a Fellow of the American Physical Society (APS) in 2024, after a nomination from the APS Division of Astrophysics, "for outstanding contributions and leadership in experimental neutrino physics to produce the first neutrino map of the Milky Way, and for strong service to improve the culture for women in physics, including the development of an active community of mid-career women in large physics collaborations".
