= The Ex-Factor =

The Ex-Factor may refer to:

- "The Ex-Factor" (Legends of Tomorrow)
- "The Ex-Factor" (The O.C.)
- "Ex-Factor", a 1998 song by Lauryn Hill

== See also ==
- X Factor (disambiguation)
