= Tom Dame =

Thomas M. Dame
- Education: Columbia University; Boston University
- Known for: Far 3 kpc Arm
- Awards: Secretary's Research Prize, Smithsonian Institution, 2009
- Scientific career
- Fields: Astronomy
- Workplaces: Harvard University; Columbia University; Goddard Institute for Space Studies
- Doctoral advisor: Patrick Thaddeus

Thomas M. Dame is Director of the Radio Telescope Data Center at the Center for Astrophysics | Harvard & Smithsonian, a Senior Radio Astronomer at the Smithsonian Astrophysical Observatory, and a Lecturer on Astronomy at Harvard University. He is best known for mapping the Milky Way galaxy in carbon monoxide and for the discovery of both the Far 3 kpc Arm and the Outer Scutum–Centaurus Arm of the Milky Way.

== Education ==
Dame graduated from Boston University in 1976 with a BA in Astronomy and Physics. He earned his Master's degrees and Ph.D. from Columbia University. His dissertation, earned under Patrick Thaddeus in 1983, was titled Molecular Clouds and Galactic Spiral Structure .

== Career ==
Comparing and combining data from radio telescopes is generally very difficult because of differences in resolution, sensitivity, and calibration. But the twin minis provide an unprecedented opportunity to produce uniform superbeam maps of the entire Milky Way, and, eventually, of the entire sky... Without the superbeam technique, the twin minis would have required several decades to map such a large area. Two telescopes with 1-arc-minute beams (like the antenna at Kitt Peak) could barely complete the job in two centuries.
Tom Dame, Sky & Telescope

After earning his doctorate, Dame worked as the National Research Council resident research associate at the Goddard Institute for Space Studies from 1983 to 1984 and then as a research associate at the Columbia University Department of Astronomy. He moved to Harvard University with Thaddeus in 1986, becoming a teaching fellow in 1988. Dame is Director of the Radio Telescope Data Center at the Center for Astrophysics | Harvard & Smithsonian.

Dame and Thaddeus have obtained what is by far the most extensive, uniform, and widely used Galactic survey of interstellar carbon monoxide (CO).

Dame discovered the Far 3 kpc Arm of the Milky Way in 2008 and the Outer Sct-Cen Arm in 2011.

== Publications ==
Dame has authored or co-authored more than 100 research papers in astronomy.

== Honors and awards ==
- Secretary's Research Prize, Smithsonian Institution, 2009
- Special Achievement Awards, Smithsonian Institution, 1989, 1997, 1999, 2007, 2009, 2010
- Postdoctoral Associateship, National Academy of Sciences (N.R.C.), 1983–1984
- Columbia University Graduate Fellowship, 1976–1978
- College Prize for Excellence in Astronomy, Boston University, 1976

== Professional memberships ==
- American Astronomical Society
