= Factor X (disambiguation) =

Factor X, or Coagulation factor X, is an enzyme.

Factor X may also refer to:

- Factor X (Chilean TV series), a version of The X Factor
- Factor X (Portuguese TV series), a version of The X Factor
- Factor X (Spanish TV series), a version of The X Factor
- El Factor X, the Colombian version of The X Factor
- Hemin, the "Factor X" required for the growth of Haemophilus influenzae
- Factor X, a Marvel Comics limited series set in the Age of Apocalypse
- “Factor X”, the motive of serial killer Dennis Rader

== See also ==
- X Factor (disambiguation)
