= Michael Thaddeus =

American mathematician

- Born: January 12, 1967 (age 59); New York City, U.S.
- Education: Harvard University (BA); St John's College, Oxford (DPhil)
- Father: Patrick Thaddeus
- Scientific career
- Fields: Algebraic geometry
- Workplaces: Harvard University; University of Oxford; Columbia University; Institute for Advanced Study
- Thesis: Algebraic Geometry and the Verlinde Formula (1992)
- Doctoral advisor: Simon Donaldson
- Website: math.columbia.edu/~thaddeus

Michael Thaddeus (born January 12, 1967) is an American mathematician and a professor of mathematics at Columbia University. He is best known for having been a whistleblower in exposing inaccurate data submitted by Columbia University to U.S. News & World Report (USNWR)'s Best Colleges Ranking to inflate the university's college ranking.

== Early life and education ==
Thaddeus was born on January 12, 1967, in New York City, and grew up in Morningside Heights. His father, Patrick, and his mother, Janice, both held doctorates from Columbia. Thaddeus was educated at St. Hilda's & St. Hugh's School before enrolling at Hunter College High School in 1980, where he graduated in 1984.

Thaddeus matriculated at Harvard University, where his sister was also a student, with the intent to study biology but switched to mathematics. He graduated in 1988 and was awarded a Rhodes Scholarship to study at St John's College, Oxford, where he earned his Doctor of Philosophy (DPhil) under the supervision of Simon Donaldson. His dissertation, Algebraic Geometry and the Verlinde Formula, was published in 1992.

== Academic career ==
In 1994, Thaddeus was elected a Junior Fellow of the Harvard Society of Fellows. He was a postdoctoral researcher at the Mittag-Leffler Institute and the Simons Laufer Mathematical Sciences Institute from 1994 and 1997. In 1998, Thaddeus joined the mathematics faculty of Columbia University. He has lectured at multiple institutions including Hunter College, Virginia Tech, and Creighton University, among others. He specializes in algebraic geometry.

Thaddeus was a member of the School of Mathematics at the Institute for Advanced Study in 2001. From 2017 to 2020, he was the chair of the math department at Columbia University.

=== Columbia rankings exposé ===
Thaddeus' exposé, "An Investigation of the Facts Behind Columbia’s U.S. News Ranking," was published in February 2022, identifying discrepancies such as shrunken class sizes and the exaggeration of faculty credentials. Due to Thaddeus' analysis, Columbia later dropped from having been ranked 2nd to being ranked 18th, sparking speculation about the integrity of college rankings.

== Selected publications ==
- Thaddeus, Michael; Martens, Johan (October 30, 2012). "Variations on a theme of Grothendieck". arXiv:1210.8161 [math.AG].
