= Galactic ridge =

Region of space

The galactic ridge is a region of the inner galaxy that is coincident with the galactic plane of the Milky Way. It can be seen from Earth as a band of stars which is interrupted by 'dust lanes'. In these 'dust lanes' the dust in the gaseous galactic disk (or plane) blocks the visible light of the background stars. Due to this, many of the most interesting features of the Milky Way can only be viewed in X-rays. Along with the point X-ray sources which populate the Milky Way, an apparently diffuse X-ray emission concentrated in the galactic plane is also observed. This is known as the galactic ridge X-ray emission (GRXE). These emissions were originally discovered by Diana Worrall and collaborators in 1982, and since then the origins of these emissions have puzzled astrophysicists around the globe.

It was initially believed, due to the difficulty of resolving the GRXE into point sources, that the x-ray emissions were truly diffuse in nature and that their origin might be a Galactic plasma rather than distant stellar sources. It was thought to be caused by low energy cosmic rays interacting with cold gas in the region, which heated up the gas and caused it to emit X-rays. However it was discovered that the temperature of a gas producing such an emission would have to be around tens of millions of degrees. This temperature is far too high for a gas to be bound gravitationally to the galaxy. Therefore, it was proposed that the GRXE might be caused by many extremely remote and outlying stars. In 2009, after decades of attempting to resolve the GRXE, Mikhail Revnivtsev, his partner Sazonov and their colleges managed to resolve approximately 80% of the emissions over the course of 12 days using the Chandra X-ray observatory. During this time period a total of 473 sources of x-ray emission were detected in an area that is significantly smaller than the size of a Full Moon. This is one of the highest densities of x-ray sources ever seen in our Galaxy. Due to this amazing discovery it is now thought that about 80% of the emission comes from discrete sources such as white dwarfs and stars with active coronae.

However, recent work by researchers at the Max Planck Institute for Astrophysics suggests that the GRXE may indeed consist of an additional, diffuse component after all. This diffuse component could arise not from the thermal emission of a very hot plasma but from the reprocessing by the interstellar gas of the X-ray radiation produced by luminous X-ray binary sources located in the Galaxy. X-ray binaries are the most luminous sources of X-rays in galaxies such as the Milky Way. These binary systems emit X-ray radiation when material or substance from a so-called donor star falls into the strong gravitational field of a compact object, such as a neutron star or a black hole. This X-ray radiation illuminates the atoms and molecules in the Galactic interstellar gas, which then scatter the incoming photons in different directions and at different energies. The resulting emission appears truly diffuse to the viewer.

The Galactic Ridge has a width of 5° latitude (b) and ±40° longitude (l) in the Galactic coordinate system.

The first instrument that was able to measure diffuse X-ray emission was the A2 experiment on the High Energy Astronomy Observatory 1 (HEAO-1). However it was created to study the large-scale structure of the galaxy and the universe, and to yield high-quality spatial and spectral data in the X-ray region. Still, the A2 produced valuable information on discrete X-ray sources such as binary star systems, hot white dwarfs, cataclysmic variables and supernova remnants. The A2 also allowed for the study of extragalactic objects, for example radio galaxies, Seyfert galaxies, and quasars. Elihu Boldt was the principal investigator of the A2 instrument, working alongside G. Gamire on the project. The HEAO-1 was launched in 1977, with a mission to scan the sky for approximately 17 months. It produced the first low-background, all-sky maps in the 2-60 keV band, and for its time the A2 produced the best spectra ever obtained over 2-60 keV energy range.
