= Near 3 kpc Arm =

Minor arm near the center of the Milky Way Galaxy

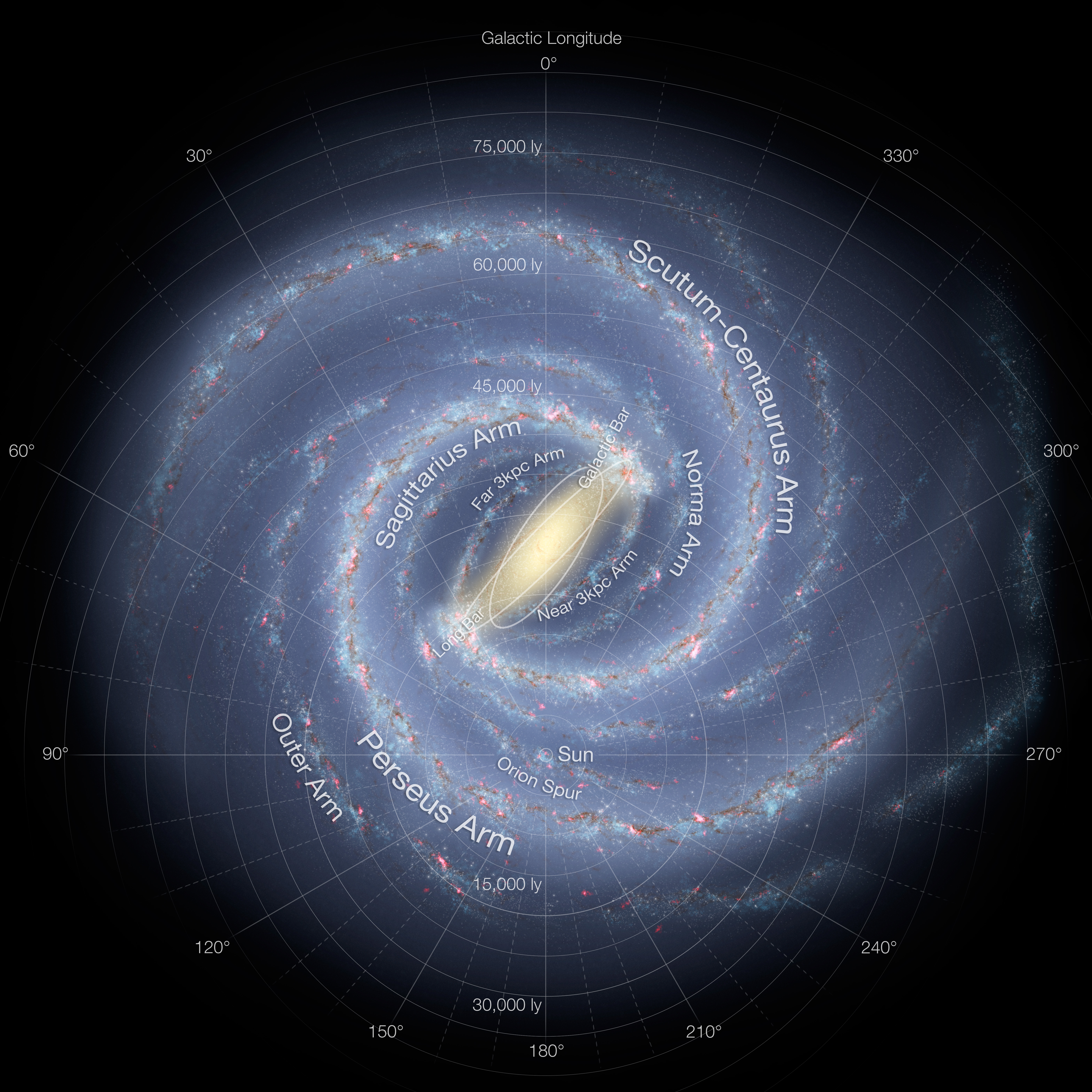
Artist's conception of the spiral structure of the Milky Way with two major stellar arms and a central bar. In this image the Near 3 kpc Arm is located near the center, below and to the right of the bulge.

The Near 3 kpc Arm (formerly also called Expanding 3 kpc Arm or simply 3 kpc Arm) was discovered in the 1950s by astronomer van Woerden and collaborators through 21-centimeter radio measurements of HI (atomic hydrogen). It was found to be expanding away from the center of the Milky Way at more than 50 km/s. This spiral arm contains about 10 million solar masses of gas, mostly hydrogen atoms and molecules. It is named for its distance (more accurately, 3.3 kpc) from the Galactic Center. It is about 5.2 kpc from the Sun, and is located in the fourth galactic quadrant.

The last attempt to search for star forming regions in the Near 3 kpc Arm (in 1980) showed little star formation occurring in the numerous molecular clouds of this arm.

Along with the Far 3 kpc Arm discovered in 2008, these inner arms establish the Milky Way galaxy's simple symmetry.

== See also ==
- Galactic disc
