= Far 3 kpc Arm =

Minor arm near the center of the Milky Way galaxy

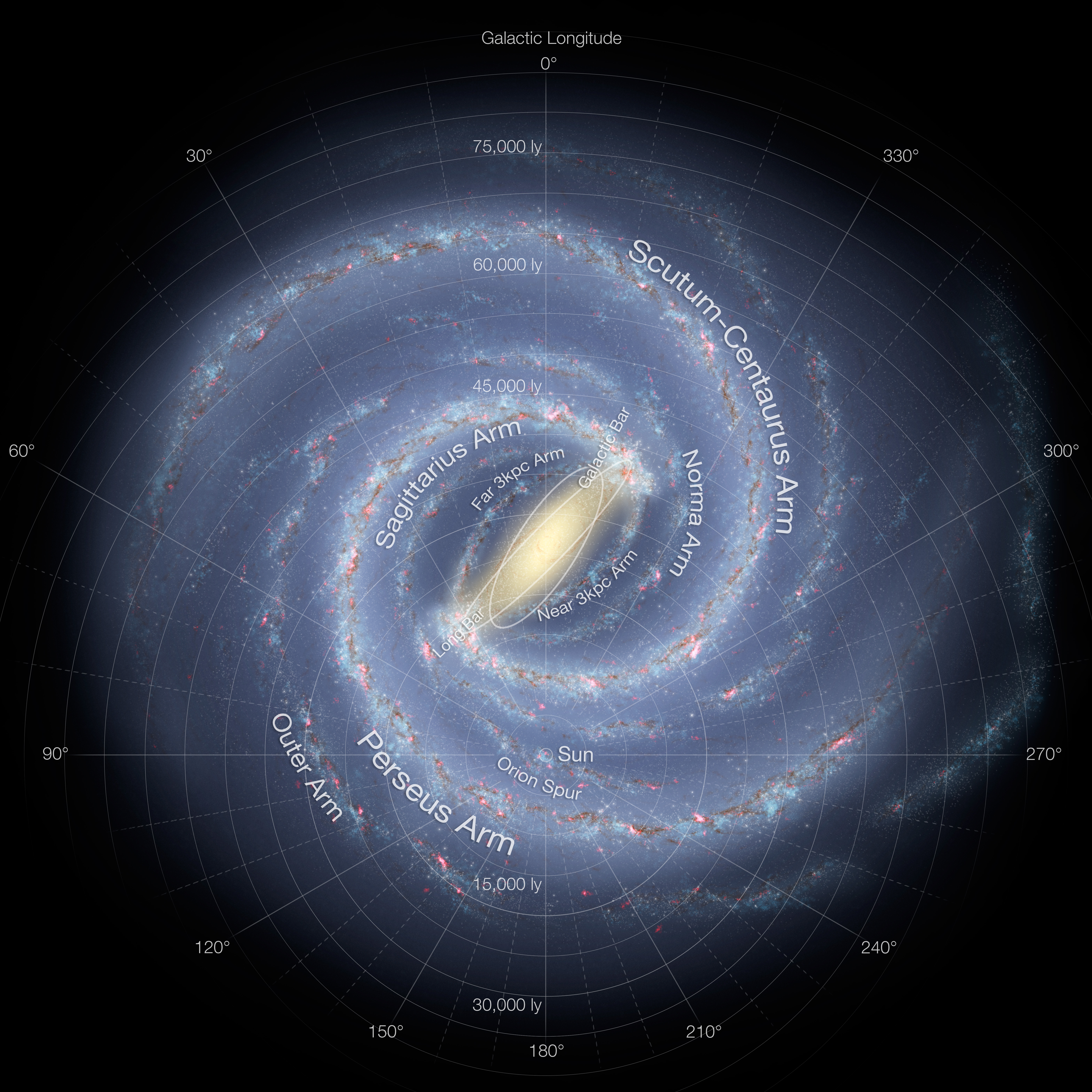
Artist's conception of the spiral structure of the Milky Way with two major stellar arms and a central bar. In this image the Far 3 kpc Arm is located near the center, above and to the left of the bulge.

The Far 3 kpc Arm was discovered in 2008 by astronomer Tom Dame while preparing a talk on the galaxy's spiral arms for a meeting of the 212th American Astronomical Society. It is one of the spiral arms of the Milky Way and it is located in the first galactic quadrant at a distance of 3 kiloparsecs (9,800 light-years) from the Galactic Center. Along with the Near 3 kpc Arm, the existence of which has been known since the mid-1950s, the counterpart inner arms establish the symmetry of the Milky Way.

Tom Dame and collaborator Patrick Thaddeus analyzed data obtained using a 1.2-meter-diameter millimeter-wave telescope located at Cerro Tololo Inter-American Observatory (CTIO) in Chile. They detected the presence of the spiral arm in a CO survey and later confirmed their discovery using 21-centimeter radio measurements of atomic hydrogen collected by colleagues in Australia.

== See also ==
- Galactic disc
