= X-factor (astrophysics) =

Proportionality between CO emission-line brightness and H2 mass

The X-factor in astrophysics, often labeled X_{CO}, is an empirically determined proportionality constant which converts carbon monoxide (CO) emission line brightness to molecular hydrogen (H_{2}) mass. The term X-factor was coined in a 1983 paper titled "Gamma-rays from atomic and molecular gas in the first galactic quadrant" and published in The Astrophysical Journal.

== Calibration ==
Calibrating X_{CO} requires an independent method of determining the amount of molecular hydrogen in a given astrophysical region. While direct emission from molecular hydrogen is difficult to observe, there are other ways of inferring molecular hydrogen mass, outlined below.

- The mass of an individual molecular cloud can be inferred from its velocity dispersion. Assuming that the cloud is self gravitating and virialized, and that nearly all of the gas mass is molecular hydrogen, one obtains an estimate of the cloud's H_{2} mass.
- H_{2} mass can be estimated through gamma ray observations, where gamma ray emission arises from the interaction of cosmic rays with H_{2} molecules.
- Using optical and infrared observations, one can estimate the amount of dust in a region and convert to H_{2} mass through an (empirically determined) dust-to-gas ratio.
