= Milky Way =

Galaxy containing the Solar System

- The Milky Way as seen from Earth's night sky, with a laser pointed directly at the Galactic Center; dark areas are known as the Great Rift.

Observation data (J2000 epoch)
- Right ascension: 17^{h} 45^{m} 40.03599^{s}
- Declination: −29° 00′ 28.1699″
- Distance: 7.935–8.277 kpc (25,881–26,996 ly) (Note: The distance towards its center (Sagittarius A*).)

Characteristics
- Type: Sb; Sbc; SB(rs)bc
- Mass: 1.15×10^{12} M_{☉}
- Number of stars: 100–400 billion ((1–4)×10^{11})
- Size: 26.8 ± 1.1 kpc (87,400 ± 3,600 ly) (diameter; D_{25} isophote) (Note: This is the diameter measured using the D_{25} standard. It has been recently suggested that there is a presence of disk stars beyond this diameter, although it is not clear how much of this influences the surface brightness profile.)
- Half-light radius (physical): 5.75±0.38 kpc
- H I scale length (physical): 70 kpc (228,000 ly)
- Thickness of thin disk: 220–450 pc (718–1,470 ly)
- Thickness of thick disk: 2.6 ± 0.5 kpc (8,500 ± 1,600 ly)
- Angular momentum: ~1×10^{67} J s
- Sun's Galactic rotation period: 212 Myr
- Spiral pattern rotation period: 220–360 Myr
- Bar pattern rotation period: 160–180 Myr
- Speed relative to CMB rest frame: 552.2±5.5 km/s
- Escape velocity at Sun's position: 550 km/s
- Dark matter density at Sun's position: 0.0088+0.0024 −0.0018 M_{☉}pc^{−3} (0.35+0.08 −0.07 GeV cm^{−3})

Artist's impression of the structure of the Milky Way based on data from the European Space Agency's Gaia telescope

The Milky Way or Milky Way Galaxy, (Note: Some authors use the term Milky Way to refer exclusively to the band of light that the galaxy forms in the night sky, while the galaxy receives the full name Milky Way Galaxy. See for example Laustsen et al., Pasachoff, Jones, van der Kruit, and Hodge et al.) or simply the Galaxy, is the galaxy that includes the Solar System, with the name describing the galaxy's appearance from Earth: a hazy band of light seen in the night sky formed by stars in other arms of the galaxy, which are so far away that they cannot be individually distinguished by the naked eye.

Galileo Galilei first resolved the band of light into individual stars with his telescope in 1610. Until the early 1920s, most astronomers thought that the Milky Way contained all the stars in the universe, but following the 1920 Great Debate between the astronomers Harlow Shapley and Heber Doust Curtis, observations by Edwin Hubble in 1923 showed that the Milky Way was just one of many galaxies.

The Milky Way is a barred spiral galaxy with a D_{25} isophotal diameter estimated at 26.8 ± 1.1 kiloparsecs (87,400 ± 3,600 light-years), but also has a surrounding area of dark matter with a total diameter possibly approaching 613 kpc (2 million ly). The stars in the innermost 10,000 light-years form a bulge, from which the bar radiates. At the Milky Way's center is an intense radio source known as Sagittarius A*, a supermassive black hole with a mass of 4.100 (± 0.034) million solar masses. The galaxy is estimated to contain 100–400 billion stars and at least that number of planets.

The galaxy's oldest stars probably formed shortly after the Dark Ages of the early universe, taking a spherical shape before flattening into a spiral disk, in which later generations of stars formed. The Solar System is located on the inner edge of the Orion Arm at a radius of about 27,000 light-years (8.3 kpc) from the Galactic Center. The Milky Way has several satellite galaxies and is part of the Local Group of galaxies, forming part of the Virgo Supercluster, which is itself a component of the Laniakea Supercluster.

== Mythology ==
In the Babylonian epic poem Enūma Eliš, the Milky Way is created from the severed tail of the primeval saltwater dragon Tiamat, set in the sky by Marduk, the Babylonian national god, after slaying her. This story was once thought to have been based on an older Sumerian version in which Tiamat is instead slain by Enlil of Nippur, but is now thought to be purely an invention of Babylonian propagandists with the intention of showing Marduk as superior to the Sumerian deities.

== Etymology ==
In Greek mythology, Zeus places Heracles, his infant son born to Alcmene, on Hera's breast while she is asleep so the baby will drink her divine milk and become immortal. Hera wakes up while breastfeeding and then realizes she is nursing an unknown baby: she pushes the baby away, some of her milk spills, and it produces the band of light known as the Milky Way. In another Greek story, the abandoned Heracles is given by Athena to Hera for feeding, but Heracles' forcefulness causes Hera to rip him from her breast in pain.

In Western culture, the name "Milky Way" derives from its appearance as a dim, unresolved, "milky" glowing band arching across the night sky. The term is a translation of the Classical Latin via lactea, in turn derived from the Hellenistic Greek γαλαξίας, short for γαλαξίας κύκλος (galaxías kýklos), meaning "milky circle". The Ancient Greek γαλαξίας (galaxias) – from root γαλακτ-, γάλα ("milk") + -ίας (forming adjectives) – is also the root of "galaxy", the name for our, and later all such, collections of stars. The Milky Way, or "milk circle", was just one of 11 "circles" the Greeks identified in the sky, others being the zodiac, the meridian, the horizon, the equator, the tropics of Cancer and Capricorn, the Arctic Circle and the Antarctic Circle, and two colure circles passing through both poles. The English term can be traced back to a story by Geoffrey Chaucer c. 1380:

See yonder, lo, the Galaxyë
Which men clepeth the Milky Wey,
For hit is whyt: and somme, parfey,

— The House of Fame

=== Other common names ===
- "Birds' Path" is used in several Uralic and Turkic languages and in the Baltic languages. Northern peoples observed that migratory birds follow the course of the galaxy while migrating in the Northern Hemisphere. The name "Birds' Path" (in Finnish, Estonian, Latvian, Lithuanian, Bashkir, and Kazakh) has some variations in other languages, e.g., "Way of the grey (wild) goose" in Chuvash, Mari, and Tatar, and "Way of the Crane" in Erzya and Moksha.
- The Kaurna people of the Adelaide Plains of South Australia called the Milky Way wodliparri in the Kaurna language, meaning "house river".
- The Gomeroi people between New South Wales and Queensland called the Milky Way Dhinawan, the giant "Emu in the Sky" that it stretches across the night sky.
- The Milky Way was traditionally used as a guide by pilgrims traveling to the holy site at Santiago de Compostela, hence the use of "The Road to Santiago" as a name for the Milky Way. Curiously, La Voje Ladee ("The Milky Way") was also used to refer to the pilgrimage road.
- River Ganga of the Sky: this Sanskrit name (आकाशगंगा Ākāśagaṃgā) is used in many Indian languages following a Hindu belief.
- The Chinese name "Silver River" (銀河) is used throughout East Asia, including Korea and Vietnam (Ngân hà). In Japan and Korea, "Silver River" (Japanese: 銀河, romanized: ginga; Korean: 은하; RR: eunha) refers to any galaxy.
- The Japanese name for the Milky Way is the "River of Heaven" (天の川, Ama no gawa), as well as an alternative name in Chinese (Chinese: 天河; pinyin: Tiānhé). In Vietnamese, "River of Heaven" (Thiên hà) refers to any galaxy.
- In West Asia, Central Asia, and parts of the Balkans, the name for the Milky Way is related to the word for straw. Today, Persians, Pakistanis, and Turks use it alongside Arabs, known to them as Darb at-Tabbānah (Arabic: درب التبانة) meaning "Pathway of the Straw". It has been suggested that the term was spread by medieval Arabs who in turn borrowed it from Armenians.
- In Serbo-Croatian it is interchangeably called "Kumova slama" (lit. transl. Godfather's Straw) along the "Mliječni put" (lit. transl. Milky Way).
- Scandinavian peoples, such as Swedes, have called the galaxy "Winter Street" (Vintergatan) as the galaxy is most clearly visible during the winter in the northern hemisphere, especially at high latitudes where the glow of the Sun late at night can obscure it during the summer.

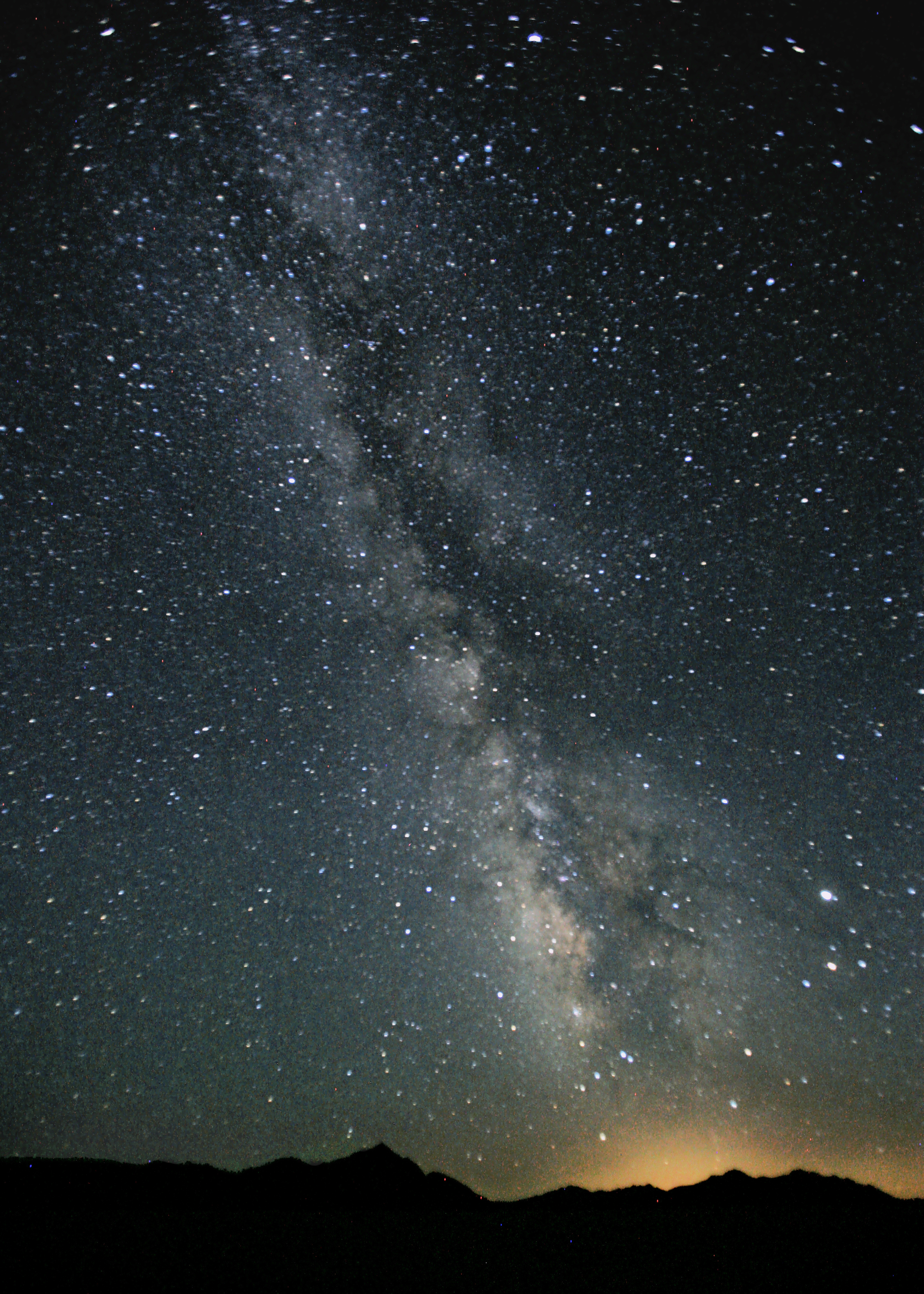
The Milky Way as seen from a dark site with little light pollution

== Appearance ==
The Milky Way is visible as a hazy band of white light, some 30° wide, arching in the night sky. Although all the individual naked-eye stars in the entire sky are part of the Milky Way Galaxy, the term "Milky Way" is limited to this band of light. The light originates from the accumulation of unresolved stars and other material located in the direction of the galactic plane. Brighter regions around the band appear as soft visual patches known as star clouds. The most conspicuous of these is the Large Sagittarius Star Cloud, a portion of the central bulge of the galaxy. Dark regions within the band, such as the Great Rift and the Coalsack, are areas where interstellar dust blocks light from distant stars. Peoples of the Southern Hemisphere, including the Inca and Australian Aboriginals, identified these regions as dark cloud constellations. The area of sky that the Milky Way obscures is called the Zone of Avoidance.

The Milky Way has a relatively low surface brightness. Its visibility can be greatly reduced by background light, such as light pollution or moonlight. The sky needs to be darker than about 20.2 magnitude per square arcsecond for the Milky Way to be visible. It should be visible if the limiting magnitude is approximately +5.1 or better and shows a great deal of detail at +6.1. This makes the Milky Way difficult to see from brightly lit urban or suburban areas, but very prominent when viewed from rural areas when the Moon is below the horizon. (Note: See also Bortle Dark-Sky Scale.) Maps of artificial night sky brightness show that more than one-third of Earth's population cannot see the Milky Way from their homes due to light pollution.

As viewed from Earth, the visible region of the Milky Way's galactic plane occupies an area of the sky that includes 30 constellations. (Note: The bright center of the galaxy is located in the constellation Sagittarius. From Sagittarius, the hazy band of white light appears to pass westward through the constellations of Scorpius, Ara, Norma, Triangulum Australe, Circinus, Centaurus, Musca, Crux, Carina, Vela, Puppis, Canis Major, Monoceros, Orion and Gemini, Taurus, to the galactic anticenter in Auriga. From there, it passes through Perseus, Andromeda, Cassiopeia, Cepheus and Lacerta, Cygnus, Vulpecula, Sagitta, Aquila, Ophiuchus, Scutum, and back to Sagittarius.) The Galactic Center lies in the direction of Sagittarius, where the Milky Way is brightest. From Sagittarius, the hazy band of white light appears to pass around to the galactic anticenter in Auriga. The band then continues the rest of the way around the sky, back to Sagittarius, dividing the sky into two roughly equal hemispheres.

The galactic plane is inclined by about 60° to the ecliptic (the path of the Sun in the sky). It is tilted at an angle of 63° to the celestial equator.

=== Naked eye viewing ===
Naked eye viewing of the Milky Way as a band across the sky is based on several considerations:

- Because the galaxy is structured as a plane, a high density of stars is seen by looking into the plane, toward the Galactic Center. However, the other stars outside the band are also in the Milky Way.
- The galactic plane is 60 degrees tilted from the ecliptic of the Earth's orbit of the Sun. Thus, the band appears in the night sky at an angle to the horizon.
- As with all celestial object viewing, the Earth's orbit around the Sun affects the direction of view. The night sky is only facing the plane's center for a portion of the orbit; thus, the seasonality of viewing varies. The band is always there, but for a portion of the year, it is in the direction of the sun (daytime), so its light is washed out.
- As with all celestial object viewing, the Milky Way appears to rise over the horizon, rotate higher, and then fall over the horizon. This is caused by Earth's rotation, which brings the band into and out of our line of sight.

Viewing the Milky Way band of light and its Galactic Center requires the following conditions:

- Eyes adapted to the dark sky (30 minutes)
- Low light pollution (Bortle 4 or lower)
- Low or no moonlight (during a 5-day window of a new moon)
- Low level of haze and humidity, which may not be obvious
- Correct season for the hemisphere from which you are viewing (May–August is best in North America)
- Correct time of night; as with other celestial objects, it appears to rise and fall in the night sky.
- Correct viewing direction: in the Northern Hemisphere, it is in the south, between Sagittarius and Scorpius. In the southern hemisphere, it is near Carina and Centaurus.

== Astronomical history ==
=== Ancient, naked eye observations ===
Greek philosopher Aristotle (384–322 BC) states in his Meteorologica that his predecessors Anaxagoras (c. 500–428 BC) and Democritus (460–370 BC) had held the Milky Way to be the glow of stars not directly visible due to Earth's shadow, while other stars receive their light from the Sun, but have their glow obscured by solar rays. Aristotle himself believed that the Milky Way was part of the Earth's upper atmosphere, along with the stars, and that it was a byproduct of stars burning that did not dissipate because of its outermost location in the atmosphere, composing its great circle. He said that the milky appearance of the Milky Way Galaxy is due to the refraction of the Earth's atmosphere. The Neoplatonist philosopher Olympiodorus the Younger (c. 495–570 AD) criticized this view, arguing that if the Milky Way were sublunary, it should appear different at different times and places on Earth, and that it should have parallax, which it does not. In his view, the Milky Way is celestial. This idea would be influential later in the Muslim world.

The Persian astronomer Al-Biruni (973–1048) proposed that the Milky Way is "a collection of countless fragments of the nature of nebulous stars". The Andalusian astronomer Avempace (died 1138) proposed that the Milky Way was made up of many stars but appeared to be a continuous image in the Earth's atmosphere, citing his observation of a conjunction of Jupiter and Mars in 1106 or 1107 as evidence. The Persian astronomer Nasir al-Din al-Tusi (1201–1274) in his Tadhkira wrote: "The Milky Way, i.e. the Galaxy, is made up of a very large number of small, tightly clustered stars, which, on account of their concentration and smallness, seem to be cloudy patches. Because of this, it was likened to milk in color." Ibn Qayyim al-Jawziyya (1292–1350) proposed that the Milky Way is "a myriad of tiny stars packed together in the sphere of the fixed stars".

=== Telescopic observations ===
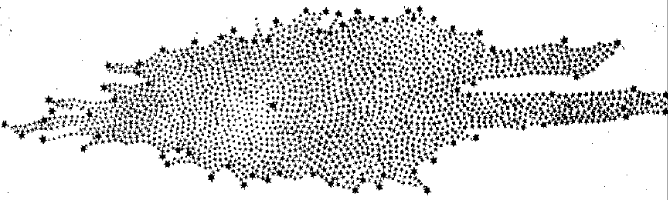
The shape of the Milky Way as deduced from star counts by William Herschel in 1785. The Solar System was assumed to be near the center.

Proof of the Milky Way as a system of many stars came in 1610, when Galileo Galilei used an optical telescope to study the Milky Way and discovered that it was composed of a vast number of faint stars. In a treatise in 1755, Immanuel Kant, misinterpreting Thomas Wright's suggestion that the Milky Way was shaped like a balloon, speculated (correctly) that the Milky Way might be a rotating body of a huge number of stars, held together by gravitational forces akin to the Solar System but on much larger scales. The resulting disk of stars would be seen as a band in the sky from our perspective inside the disk. Wright and Kant also conjectured that some of the nebulae visible in the night sky might be separate "galaxies" themselves, similar to our own. Kant referred to both the Milky Way and the "extragalactic nebulae" as "island universes", a term still current up to the 1930s.

The first attempt to describe the shape of the Milky Way and the position of the Sun within it was carried out by William Herschel in 1785 by carefully counting the number of stars in different regions of the visible sky. He produced a diagram of the Milky Way's shape, with the Solar System near its center.

In 1845, Lord Rosse constructed a new telescope and was able to distinguish individual point sources in what had been dim blobs known as nebulae and to determine the spiral structure of what is now called the Whirlpool Galaxy (M51).

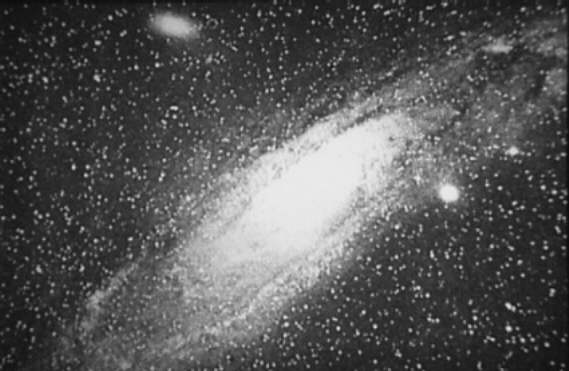
Photograph of the "Great Andromeda Nebula" from 1899, later identified as the Andromeda Galaxy

In 1904, while studying the proper motions of stars, Jacobus Kapteyn reported that these were not random, as was believed at the time; stars could be divided into two streams, moving in nearly opposite directions. It was later realized that Kapteyn's data had been the first evidence of the rotation of the Milky Way, which ultimately led to the finding of galactic rotation by Bertil Lindblad and Jan Oort.

In 1917, Heber Doust Curtis had observed the nova S Andromedae within the Great Andromeda Nebula (Messier object 31). Searching the photographic record, he found 11 more novae. Curtis noticed that these novae were, on average, 10 magnitudes fainter than those that occurred within the Milky Way. As a result, he was able to come up with a distance estimate of 150,000 parsecs. He became a proponent of the "island universes" hypothesis, which held that the spiral nebulae were independent galaxies. Until the early 1920s, most astronomers thought that the Milky Way contained all the stars in the universe.

In 1920 the Great Debate took place between Harlow Shapley and Heber Curtis, concerning the nature of the Milky Way, spiral nebulae, and the dimensions of the universe. To support his claim that the Great Andromeda Nebula is an external galaxy, Curtis noted the appearance of dark lanes resembling the dust clouds in the Milky Way, as well as the significant Doppler shift.

The controversy was conclusively settled by Edwin Hubble in the early 1920s using the Mount Wilson observatory 2.5 m (100 in) Hooker telescope. With the light-gathering power of this new telescope, he was able to produce astronomical photographs that resolved the outer parts of some spiral nebulae as collections of individual stars. He was also able to identify some Cepheid variables that he could use as a benchmark to estimate the distance to the nebulae. He found that the Andromeda Nebula is 275,000 parsecs from the Sun, far too distant to be part of the Milky Way.

=== Satellite observations ===
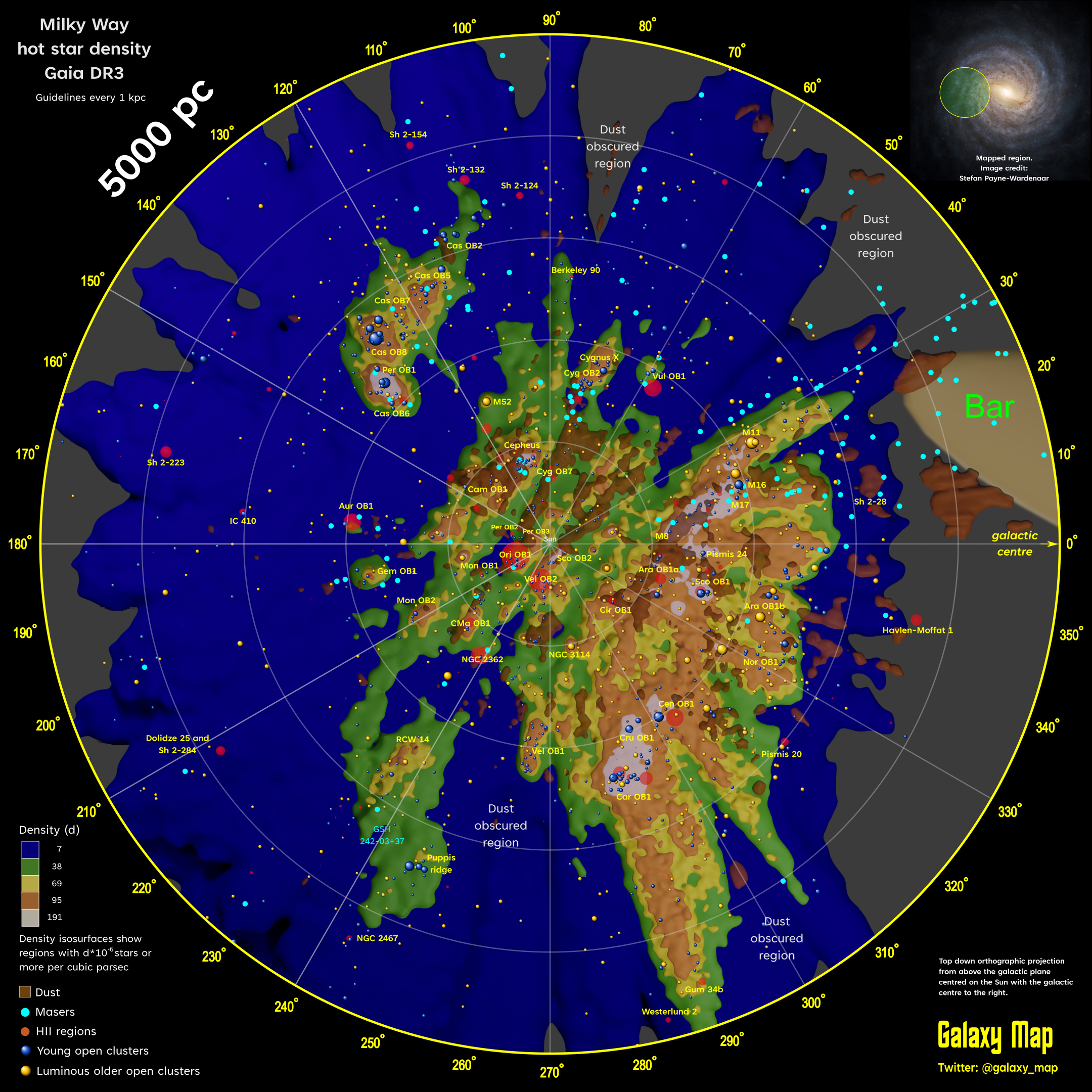
Map of stars cataloged by the Gaia release in 2021, displayed as density mesh in the diagram

The European Space Agency (ESA) spacecraft Gaia provides distance estimates by determining the parallax of a billion stars and is mapping the Milky Way.

Data from Gaia has been described as "transformational". It has been estimated that Gaia has expanded the number of observed stars from about 2 million in the 1990s to 2 billion. It has expanded the measurable volume of space by a factor of 100 in radius and 1,000 in precision.

A study in 2020 concluded that Gaia detected a wobbling motion of the galaxy, which might be caused by "torques from a misalignment of the disc's rotation axis with respect to the principal axis of a non-spherical halo, or from accreted matter in the halo acquired during late infall, or from nearby, interacting satellite galaxies and their consequent tides". In April 2024, initial studies and related maps, involving the magnetic fields of the Milky Way were reported.

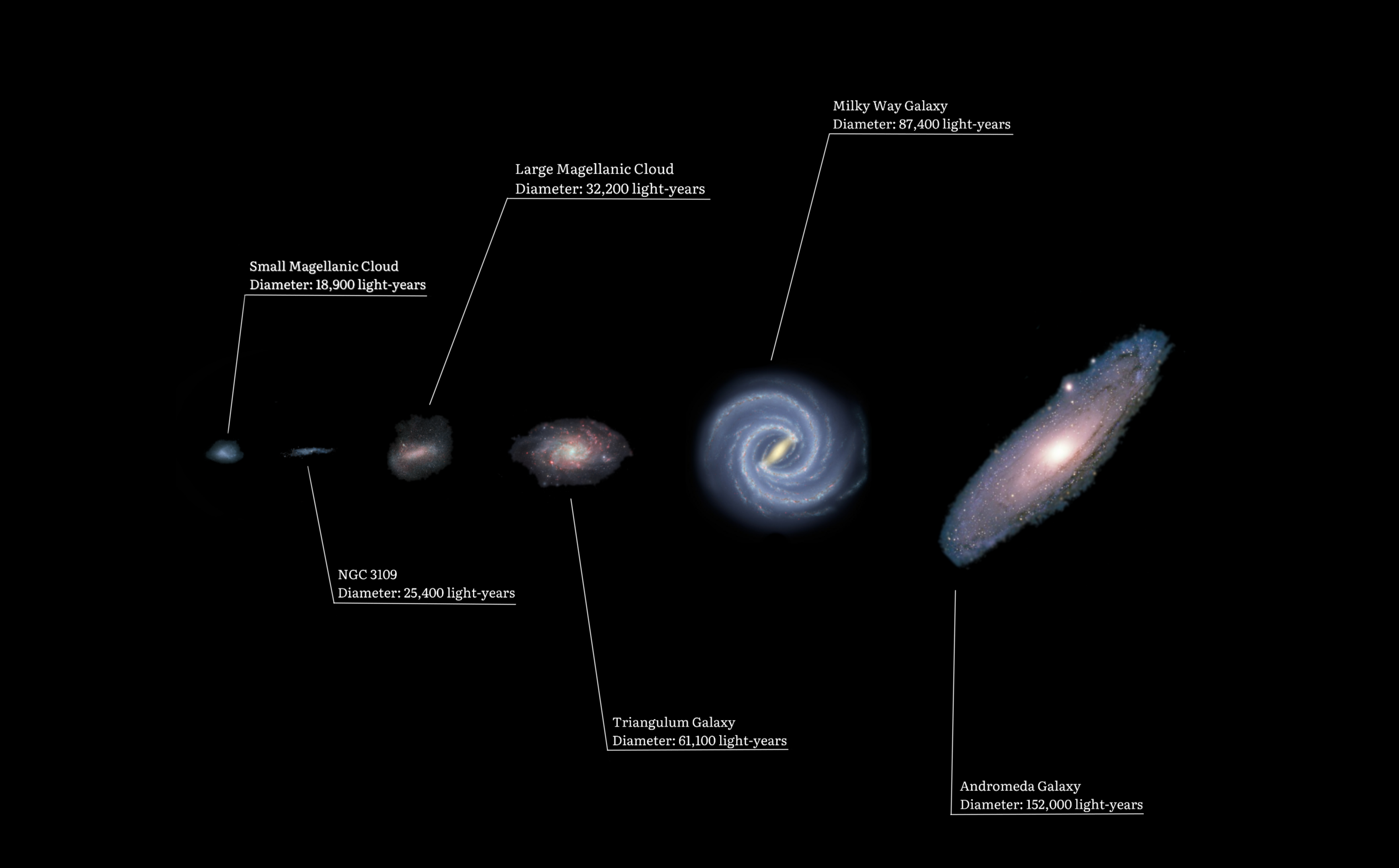
A size comparison of the Local Group's six largest galaxies, including the Milky Way (second from right)

== General characteristics ==
=== Size ===
The Milky Way is one of the two largest galaxies in the Local Group (the other being the Andromeda Galaxy). However, the size of its galactic disc and the extent to which it defines the isophotal diameter are not well understood. It is estimated that the significant bulk of stars in the galaxy lies within the 26 kiloparsecs (80,000 light-years) diameter, and that the number of stars beyond the outermost disc dramatically reduces to a very low number, with respect to an extrapolation of the exponential disk with the scale length of the inner disc.

There are several methods used in astronomy to define the size of a galaxy, and each can yield different results compared to the others. The most commonly employed method is the D_{25} standard – the isophote where the photometric brightness of a galaxy in the B-band (445 nm wavelength of light, in the blue part of the visible spectrum) reaches 25 mag/arcsec^{2}. An estimate from 1997 by Goodwin and others compared the distribution of Cepheid variable stars in 17 other spiral galaxies to the ones in the Milky Way, and modelling the relationship to their surface brightnesses. This gave an isophotal diameter for the Milky Way at 26.8 ± 1.1 kiloparsecs (87,400 ± 3,600 light-years), by assuming that an exponential disc well represents the galactic disc and adopting a central surface brightness of the galaxy (μ_{0}) of 22.1±0.3 B-mag/arcsec^{−2} and a disk scale length (h) of 5.0 ± 0.5 kpc (16,300 ± 1,600 ly).

This is significantly smaller than the Andromeda Galaxy's isophotal diameter, and slightly below the mean isophotal sizes of the galaxies, being at 28.3 kpc (92,000 ly). The paper concludes that the Milky Way and Andromeda Galaxy were not overly large spiral galaxies, nor were they among the largest known (if the former not being the largest) as previously widely believed, but rather average ordinary spiral galaxies. To compare the relative physical scale of the Milky Way, if the Solar System out to Neptune were the size of a US quarter (24.3 mm or 0.955 in), the Milky Way would be approximately at least the greatest north–south line of the contiguous United States. An even older study from 1978 gave a lower diameter for Milky Way of about 23 kpc (75,000 ly).

A 2015 paper reported that there is a ring-like filament of stars called Triangulum–Andromeda Ring (TriAnd Ring) rippling above and below the relatively flat galactic plane, which alongside Monoceros Ring were both suggested to be primarily the result of disk oscillations and wrapping around the Milky Way, at a diameter of at least 50 kpc (160,000 ly), which may be part of the Milky Way's outer disk itself, hence making the stellar disk larger by increasing to this size. A more recent 2018 paper later somewhat ruled out this hypothesis, and supported a conclusion that the Monoceros Ring, A13 and TriAnd Ring were stellar overdensities rather kicked out from the main stellar disk, with the velocity dispersion of the RR Lyrae stars found to be higher and consistent with halo membership.

Another 2018 study revealed the very probable presence of disk stars at 26–31.5 kpc (84,800–103,000 ly) from the Galactic Center or perhaps even farther, significantly beyond approximately 13–20 kpc (40,000–70,000 ly), in which it was once believed to be the abrupt drop-off of the stellar density of the disk, meaning that few or no stars were expected to be above this limit, save for stars that belong to the old population of the galactic halo.

A 2020 study predicted the edge of the Milky Way's dark matter halo being around 292 ± 61 kpc (952,000 ± 199,000 ly), which translates to a diameter of 584 ± 122 kpc (1.905 ± 0.3979 Mly). The Milky Way's stellar disk is also estimated to be approximately up to 1.35 kpc (4,000 ly) thick.

=== Mass ===
A schematic profile of the Milky Way indicating galactic north (GNP) and south poles (GSP)

The Milky Way is approximately 0.88 trillion times the mass of the Sun in total (8.8×10^{11} solar masses), using a cutoff of 200kpc to define the galaxy. Estimates of the mass of the Milky Way vary, depending upon the method and data used. The low end of the estimate range is 5.8×10^{11} solar masses (M_{☉}), somewhat less than that of the Andromeda Galaxy.

Measurements using the Very Long Baseline Array in 2009 found velocities as high as 254 km/s (570,000 mph) for stars at the outer edge of the Milky Way. Because the orbital velocity depends on the total mass inside the orbital radius, this suggests that the Milky Way is more massive, roughly equaling the mass of the Andromeda Galaxy at 7×10^{11} M_{☉} within 160,000 ly (49 kpc) of its center. In 2010, a measurement of the radial velocity of halo stars found that the mass enclosed within 80 kiloparsecs is 7×10^{11} M_{☉}. In a 2014 study, the mass of the entire Milky Way is estimated to be 8.5×10^{11} M_{☉}, but this is only half the mass of the Andromeda Galaxy. A recent 2019 mass estimate for the Milky Way is 1.29×10^{12} M_{☉}.

Much of the mass of the Milky Way seems to be dark matter, an unknown and invisible form of matter that interacts gravitationally with ordinary matter. A dark matter halo is conjectured to spread out relatively uniformly to a distance beyond one hundred kiloparsecs (kpc) from the Galactic Center. Mathematical models of the Milky Way suggest that the mass of dark matter is 1–1.5×10^{12} M_{☉}. 2013 and 2014 studies indicate a range in mass, as large as 4.5×10^{12} M_{☉} and as small as 8×10^{11} M_{☉}. By comparison, the total mass of all the stars in the Milky Way is estimated to be between 4.6×10^{10} M_{☉} and 6.43×10^{10} M_{☉}. Simulations from c. 2020 suggest that a dark matter area, also containing some visible stars, may extend up to a diameter of almost 2 million light-years (613 kpc).

In addition to the stars, there is also interstellar gas, comprising 90% hydrogen and 10% helium by mass, with two-thirds of the hydrogen found in the atomic form and the remaining one-third as molecular hydrogen. The mass of the Milky Way's interstellar gas is equal to between 10% and 15% of the total mass of its stars. Interstellar dust accounts for an additional 1% of the total mass of the gas.

In March 2019, astronomers reported that the virial mass of the Milky Way Galaxy is 1.54×10^{12} solar masses within a radius of about 39.5 kpc (130,000 ly), over twice as much as was determined in earlier studies, suggesting that about 90% of the mass of the galaxy is dark matter.

In September 2023, astronomers reported that the virial mass of the Milky Way Galaxy is only 2.06×10^{11} solar masses, only a tenth of the mass of previous studies. The mass was determined from data of the Gaia spacecraft.

Galaxy rotation curve for the Milky Way. The vertical axis is the rotation speed about the galactic center. The horizontal axis is the distance from the galactic center. The Sun is marked in yellow. Data points mark the observed rotation speed curve. The thin line indicates Stacy McGaugh's predicted curve based on the stellar mass and gas of the Milky Way. (The difference is due to dark matter or possibly a modification of gravity like Modified Newtonian dynamics.)

=== Rotation curve ===
The stars and gas in the Milky Way rotate about its center differentially, meaning that the rotation period varies with location. As is typical for spiral galaxies, the orbital speed of most stars in the Milky Way does not depend strongly on their distance from the center. Away from the central bulge or outer rim, the typical stellar orbital speed is between 200 and 220 km/s. Hence the orbital period of the typical star is approximately proportional to the length of the path traveled. This is unlike the situation in the Solar System, where two-body gravitational dynamics dominate, and different orbits have significantly different velocities. The rotation curve (shown in the figure) describes this rotation.

If the Milky Way contained only the mass observed in stars, gas, and other baryonic (ordinary) matter, the rotational speed would decrease with distance from the center. However, the observed curve is relatively flat, suggesting additional mass that cannot be directly detected with electromagnetic radiation. This inconsistency is attributed to dark matter. The rotation curve of the Milky Way agrees with the universal rotation curve of spiral galaxies, the best evidence for the existence of dark matter in galaxies. Alternatively, a minority of astronomers propose that a modification of the law of gravity may explain the observed rotation curve.

=== Peculiar velocity ===
Although special relativity states that there is no "preferred" inertial frame of reference in space with which to compare the Milky Way, the Milky Way does have a velocity with respect to cosmological frames of reference.

One such frame of reference is the Hubble flow, the apparent motions of galaxy clusters due to the expansion of space. Individual galaxies, including the Milky Way, have peculiar velocities relative to the average flow. Thus, to compare the Milky Way to the Hubble flow, one must consider a volume large enough so that the expansion of the universe dominates over local, random motions. A large enough volume means that the mean motion of galaxies within this volume is equal to the Hubble flow. Astronomers believe the Milky Way is moving at approximately 630 km/s with respect to this local co-moving frame of reference.

The Milky Way is moving in the general direction of the Great Attractor and other galaxy clusters, including the Shapley Supercluster, behind it. The Local Group, a cluster of gravitationally bound galaxies containing, among others, the Milky Way and the Andromeda Galaxy, is part of a supercluster called the Local Supercluster, centered near the Virgo Cluster: although they are moving away from each other at 967 km/s as part of the Hubble flow, this velocity is less than would be expected given the 16.8 million pc distance due to the gravitational attraction between the Local Group and the Virgo Cluster.

Another reference frame is provided by the cosmic microwave background (CMB), in which the CMB temperature is least distorted by Doppler shift (zero dipole moment). The Milky Way is moving at 552±6 km/s with respect to this frame, toward 10.5 right ascension, −24° declination (J2000 epoch, near the center of Hydra). This motion is observed by satellites such as the Cosmic Background Explorer (COBE) and the Wilkinson Microwave Anisotropy Probe (WMAP) as a dipole contribution to the CMB, as photons in equilibrium in the CMB frame get blue-shifted in the direction of the motion and red-shifted in the opposite direction.

== Structure ==
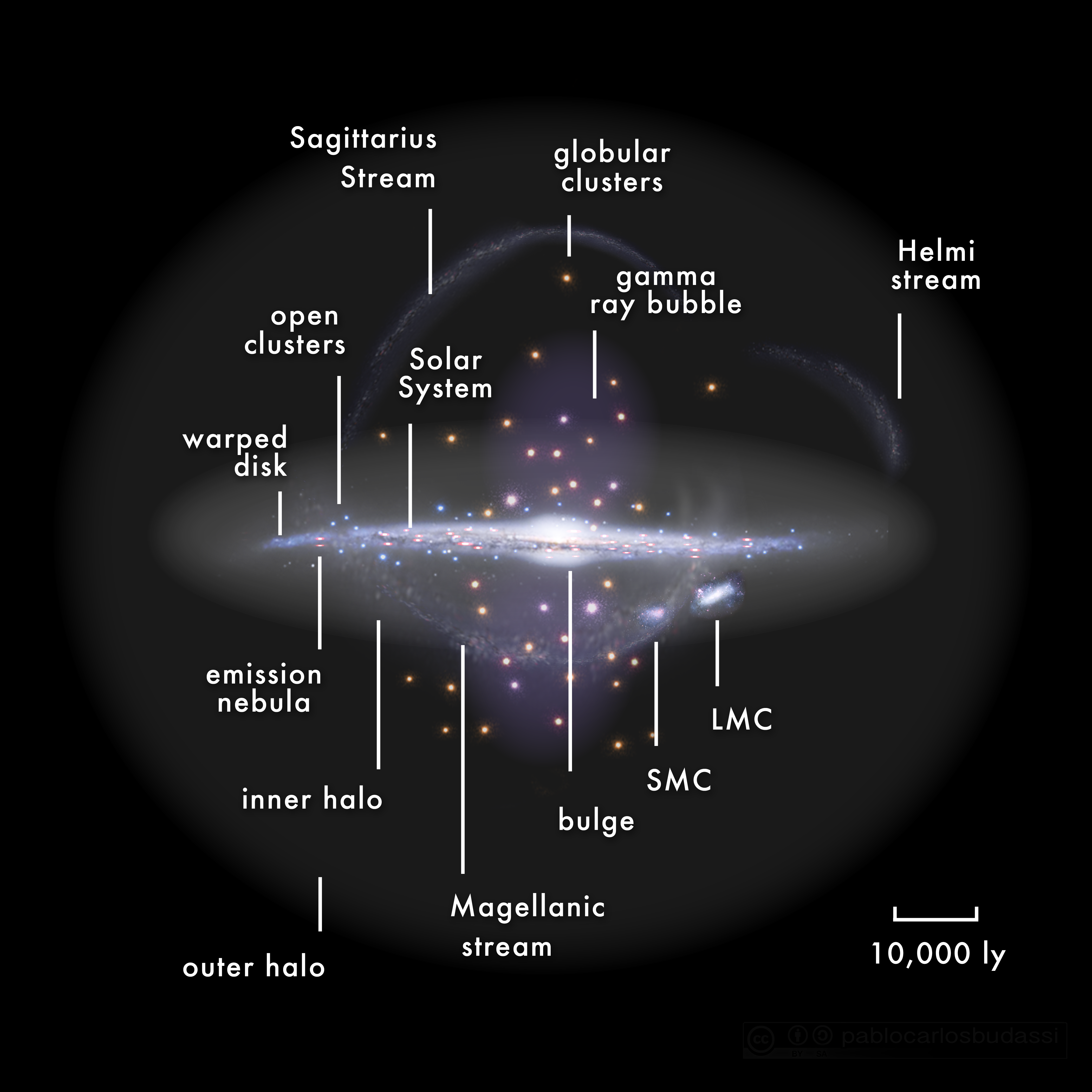
Overview of different elements of the overall structure of the Milky Way

The Milky Way consists of a bar-shaped core region surrounded by a warped disk of gas, dust, and stars. The mass distribution within the Milky Way closely resembles the type Sbc in the Hubble classification, which represents spiral galaxies with relatively loosely wound arms. Astronomers first began to conjecture that the Milky Way is a barred spiral galaxy, rather than an ordinary spiral galaxy, in the 1960s. These conjectures were confirmed by the Spitzer Space Telescope observations in 2005 that showed the Milky Way's central bar to be larger than previously thought.

=== Galactic Center ===
Supermassive black hole Sagittarius A* imaged by the Event Horizon Telescope in radio waves. The central dark spot is the black hole's shadow, which is larger than the event horizon.

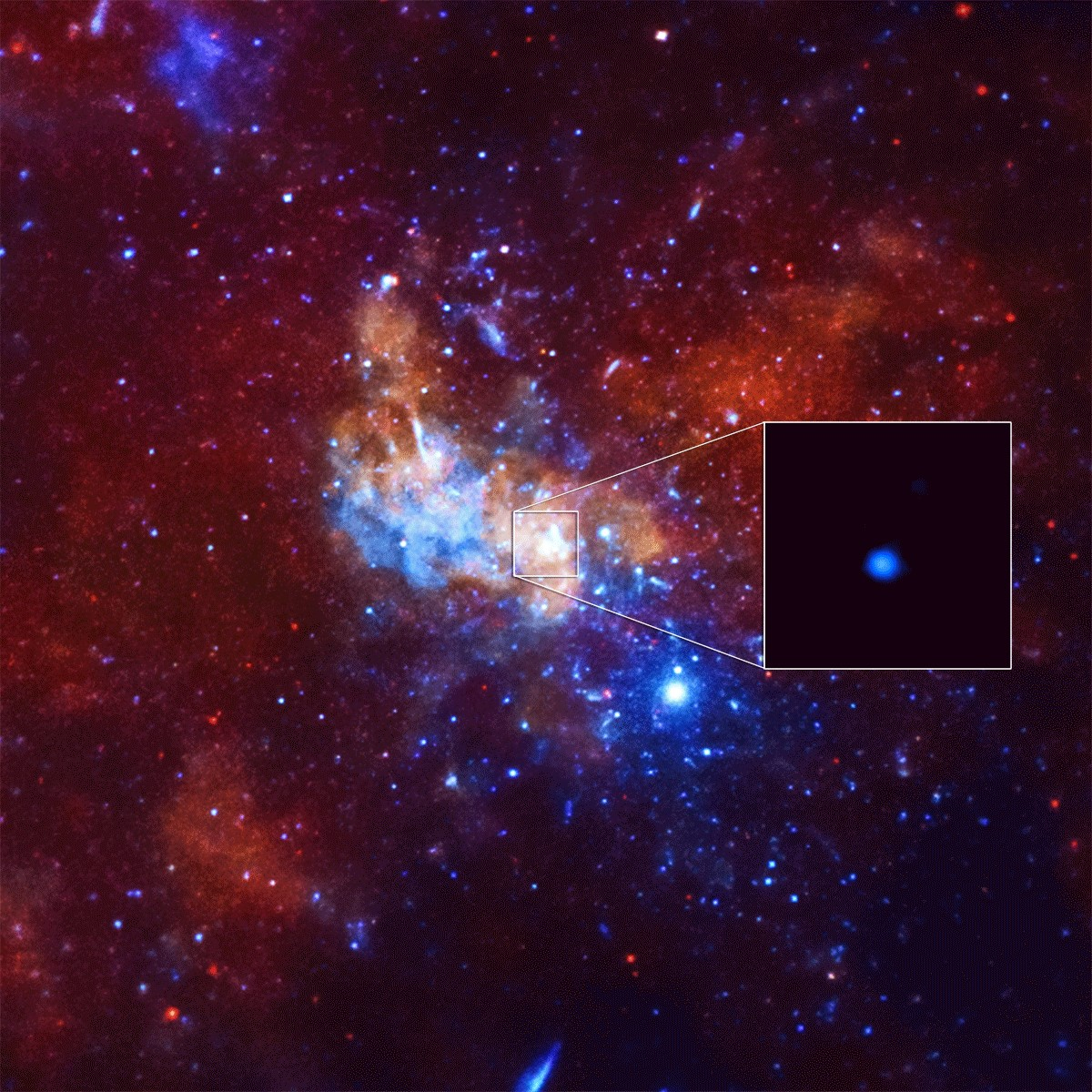
Bright X-ray flares from Sagittarius A* (inset) in the center of the Milky Way, as detected by the Chandra X-ray Observatory

The Sun is 25,000–28,000 ly (7.7–8.6 kpc) from the Galactic Center. This value is estimated using geometric-based methods or by measuring selected astronomical objects that serve as standard candles, with different techniques yielding various values within this approximate range. In the inner few kiloparsecs (around 10,000 light-years radius) is a dense concentration of mostly old stars in a roughly spheroidal shape called the bulge. It has been proposed that the Milky Way lacks a bulge due to a collision and merger between previous galaxies, and that instead it only has a pseudobulge formed by its central bar. However, confusion in the literature between the (peanut shell)-shaped structure created by instabilities in the bar, versus a possible bulge with an expected half-light radius of 0.5 kpc, abounds.

The Galactic Center is marked by an intense radio source named Sagittarius A* (pronounced Sagittarius A-star). The motion of material around the center indicates that Sagittarius A* harbors a massive, compact object. This concentration of mass is best explained as a supermassive black hole (SMBH) (Note: For a photo see: "Sagittarius A*: Milky Way monster stars in cosmic reality show". Chandra X-ray Observatory. Center for Astrophysics | Harvard & Smithsonian. January 6, 2003. Archived from the original on March 17, 2008.) with an estimated mass of 4.1–4.5 million times the mass of the Sun. The rate of accretion of the SMBH is consistent with an inactive galactic nucleus, being estimated at 1×10^{−5} M_{☉} per year. Observations indicate that there are SMBHs located near the center of most normal galaxies.

The nature of the Milky Way's bar is actively debated, with estimates for its half-length and orientation spanning from 1 to 5 kpc (3,000–16,000 ly) and 10–50 degrees relative to the line of sight from Earth to the Galactic Center. At least one author suggests that the Milky Way features two distinct bars, one nestled within the other. However, RR Lyrae-type stars do not trace a prominent galactic bar. The bar may be surrounded by a ring called the "5 kpc ring" that contains a large fraction of the molecular hydrogen present in the Milky Way, as well as most of the Milky Way's star formation activity. Viewed from the Andromeda Galaxy, it would be the brightest feature of the Milky Way. X-ray emission from the core is aligned with the massive stars surrounding the central bar and the galactic ridge.

In June 2023, astronomers led by Naoko Kurahashi Neilson reported using a new cascade neutrino technique to detect, for the first time, the release of neutrinos from the galactic plane of the Milky Way galaxy, creating the first neutrino view of the Milky Way.

==== Gamma rays and X-rays ====
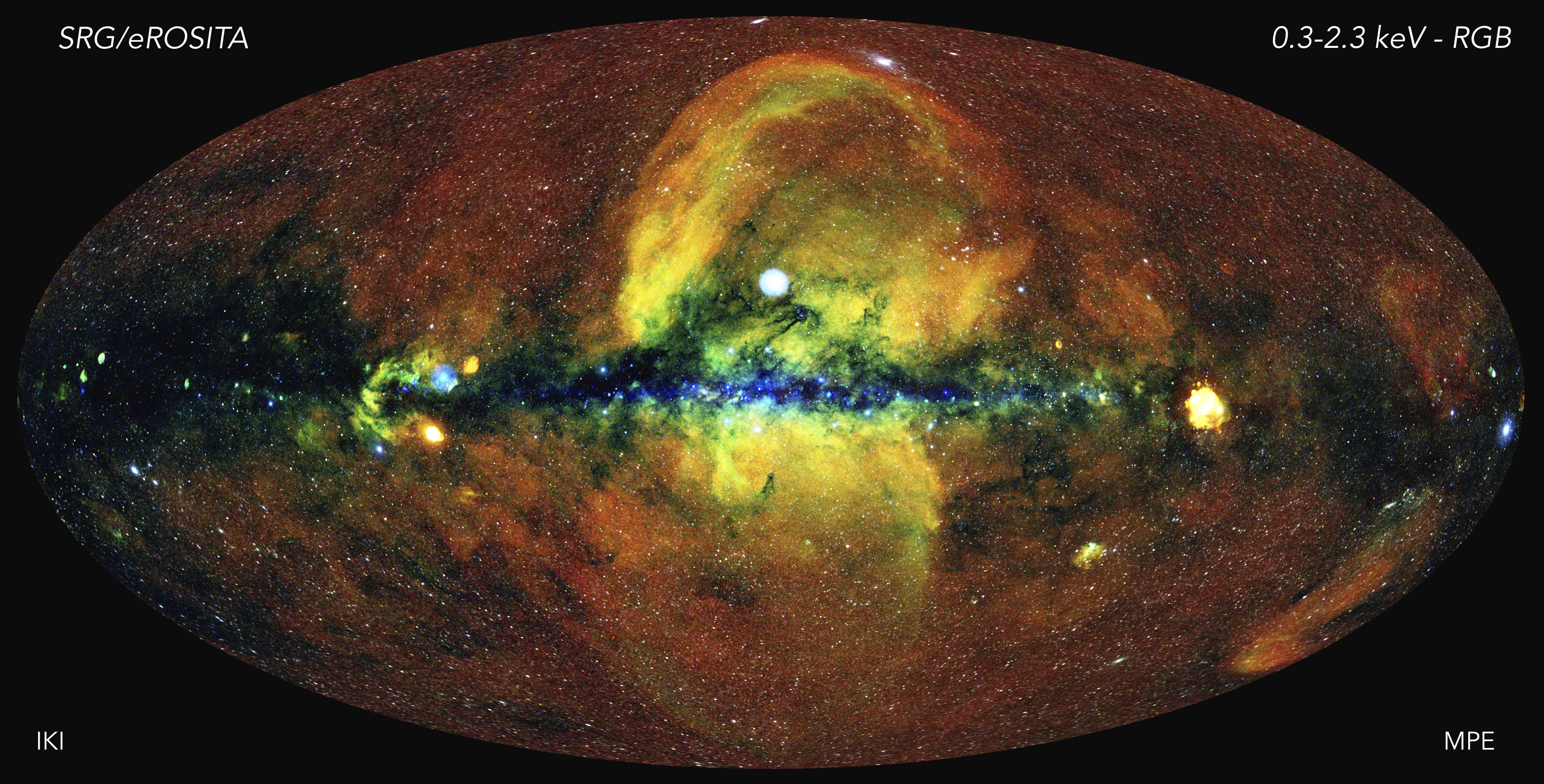
All-sky x-ray image

Since 1970, various gamma-ray detection missions have discovered 511-keV gamma rays coming from the general direction of the Galactic Center. These gamma rays are produced by positrons (antielectrons) annihilating with electrons. In 2008, it was found that the distribution of gamma-ray sources resembles that of low-mass X-ray binaries, suggesting that these X-ray binaries are sending positrons (and electrons) into interstellar space, where they slow and annihilate. The observations were made by both NASA and ESA's satellites. In 1970, gamma-ray detectors found that the emitting region was about 10,000 light-years across, with a luminosity of about 10,000 times that of the Sun.

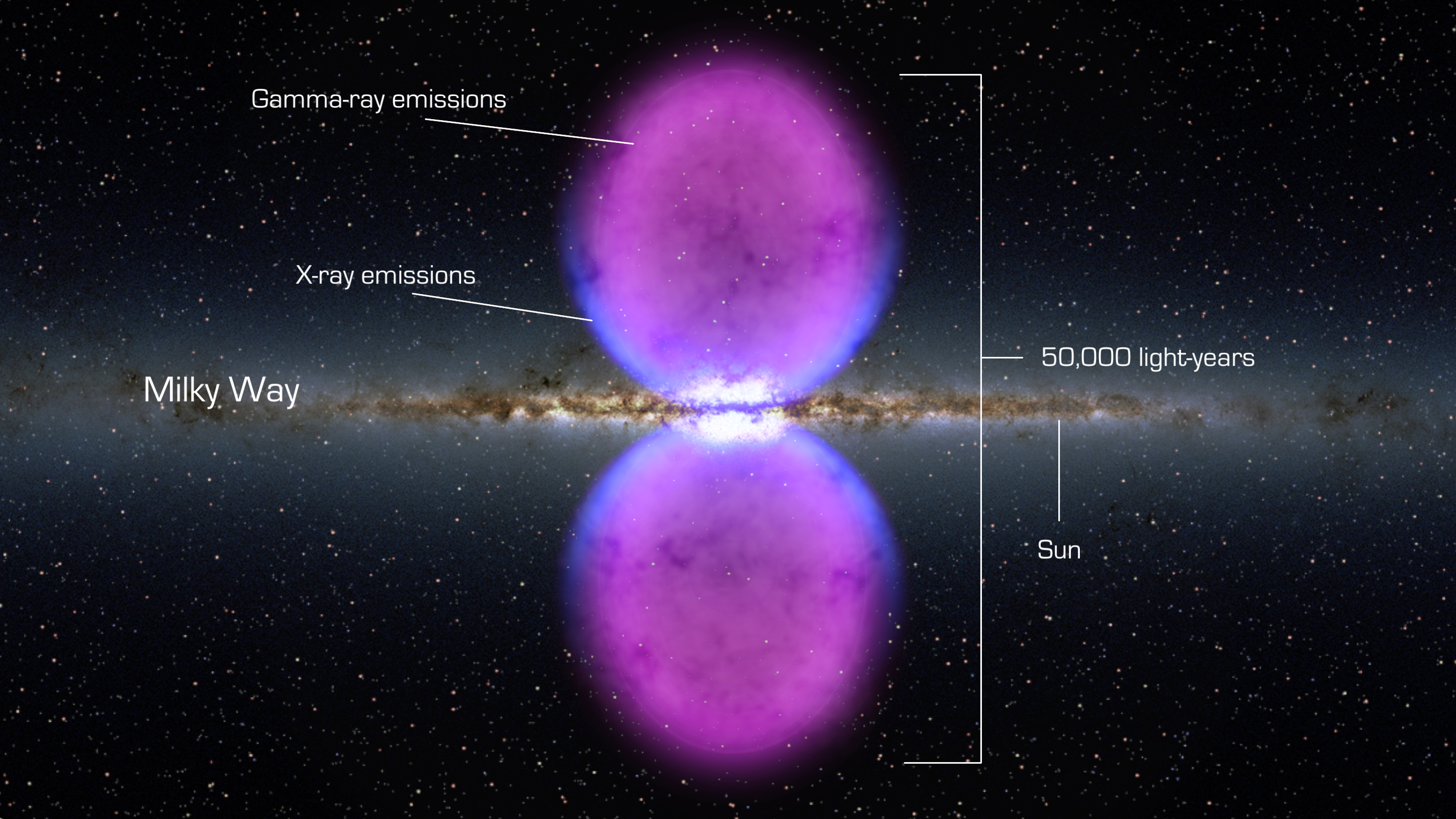
Illustration of the two gigantic X-ray/gamma-ray bubbles (blue-violet) of the Milky Way (center)

In 2010, two gigantic spherical bubbles of high-energy gamma-emission were detected to the north and the south of the Milky Way core, using data from the Fermi Gamma-ray Space Telescope. The diameter of each of the bubbles is about 25,000 light-years (7.7 kpc) (or about 1/4 of the galaxy's estimated diameter); they stretch up to Grus and to Virgo on the night-sky of the Southern Hemisphere. Subsequently, observations with the Parkes Telescope at radio frequencies identified polarized emission that is associated with the Fermi bubbles. These observations are best interpreted as a magnetized outflow driven by star formation in the central 640 ly (200 pc) of the Milky Way.

Later, on January 5, 2015, NASA reported observing an X-ray flare 400 times brighter than usual, a record-breaker, from Sagittarius A*. The unusual event may have been caused by the breaking apart of an asteroid falling into the black hole or by the entanglement of magnetic field lines within gas flowing into Sagittarius A*.

=== Spiral arms ===
Observed (normal lines) and extrapolated (dotted lines) structure of the spiral arms of the Milky Way, viewed from north of the galaxy – the galaxy rotates clockwise in this view. The gray lines radiating from the Sun's position (upper center) list the three-letter abbreviations of the corresponding constellations.

Outside the gravitational influence of the Galactic bar, the structure of the interstellar medium and stars in the disk of the Milky Way is organized into four spiral arms. Spiral arms typically contain a higher density of interstellar gas and dust than the Galactic average as well as a greater concentration of star formation, as traced by H II regions and molecular clouds.

The Milky Way's spiral structure is uncertain, and there is currently no consensus on the nature of its arms. Perfect logarithmic spiral patterns only crudely describe features near the Sun, because galaxies commonly have arms that branch, merge, twist unexpectedly, and feature a degree of irregularity. The possible scenario of the Sun within a spur or local arm emphasizes that point and indicates that such features are probably not unique, and exist elsewhere in the Milky Way. Estimates of the pitch angle of the arms range from about 7° to 25°. There are thought to be four spiral arms that all start near the galaxy's center. These are named as follows, with the positions of the arms shown in the image:

Color	Arm(s)
turquoise	Near 3 kpc and Perseus Arm
blue	Norma and Outer arm (Along with extension discovered in 2004)
green	Far 3 kpc and Scutum–Centaurus Arm
red	Carina–Sagittarius Arm
There are at least two smaller arms or spurs, including:
orange	Orion–Cygnus Arm (which contains the Sun and Solar System)

Two spiral arms, the Scutum–Centaurus arm and the Carina–Sagittarius arm, have tangent points inside the Sun's orbit about the center of the Milky Way. If these arms contain an overdensity of stars compared to the average density of stars in the Galactic disk, it would be detectable by counting the stars near the tangent point. Two surveys of near-infrared light, which is sensitive primarily to red giants and not affected by dust extinction, detected the predicted overabundance in the Scutum–Centaurus arm but not in the Carina–Sagittarius arm: the Scutum–Centaurus Arm contains approximately 30% more red giants than would be expected in the absence of a spiral arm.

This observation suggests that the Milky Way possesses only two major stellar arms: the Perseus arm and the Scutum–Centaurus arm. The rest of the arms contain excess gas but not excess old stars. In December 2013, astronomers found that the distribution of young stars and star-forming regions matches the four-arm spiral description of the Milky Way. Thus, the Milky Way appears to have two spiral arms as traced by old stars and four spiral arms as traced by gas and young stars. The explanation for this apparent discrepancy is unclear.

The Near 3 kpc Arm (also called the Expanding 3 kpc Arm or simply the 3 kpc Arm) was discovered in the 1950s by astronomer van Woerden and collaborators through 21 centimeter radio measurements of H^{I} (atomic hydrogen). It was found to be expanding away from the central bulge at more than 50 km/s. It is located in the fourth galactic quadrant at a distance of about 5.2 kpc from the Sun and 3.3 kpc from the Galactic Center. The Far 3 kpc Arm was discovered in 2008 by astronomer Tom Dame (Center for Astrophysics | Harvard & Smithsonian). It is located in the first galactic quadrant at a distance of 3 kpc (about 10,000 ly) from the Galactic Center.

A simulation published in 2011 suggested that the Milky Way may have obtained its spiral arm structure as a result of repeated collisions with the Sagittarius Dwarf Elliptical Galaxy.

It has been suggested that the Milky Way contains two different spiral patterns: an inner one, formed by the Sagittarius arm, that rotates fast, and an outer one, formed by the Carina and Perseus arms, whose rotation velocity is slower and whose arms are tightly wound. In this scenario, suggested by numerical simulations of the dynamics of the different spiral arms, the outer pattern would form an outer pseudoring, and the two patterns would be connected by the Cygnus arm.

Outside of the major spiral arms is the Monoceros Ring (or Outer Ring), a ring of gas and stars torn from other galaxies billions of years ago. However, several members of the scientific community recently restated their position, affirming the Monoceros structure is nothing more than an over-density produced by the flared and warped thick disk of the Milky Way. The structure of the Milky Way's disk is warped along an "S" curve.

=== Halo ===
The galactic disk is surrounded by a spheroidal halo of old stars and globular clusters and contains most of the Milky Way's dark matter. It is moderately triaxial in shape, with the longest axis tilted about 25° above the disk and 24° ahead of the Sun. Its density seems to obey a power law with two breaks at around 15 and 30 kiloparsecs (49 and 98 kly). However, a few globular clusters have been found farther, such as PAL 4 and AM 1 at more than 200,000 light-years from the Galactic Center. About 40% of the Milky Way's clusters are on retrograde orbits, which means they move in the opposite direction from the Milky Way rotation. The globular clusters can follow rosette orbits about the Milky Way, in contrast to the elliptical orbit of a planet around a star.

Although the disk contains dust that obscures the view at some wavelengths, the halo component does not. Active star formation takes place in the disk (especially in the spiral arms, which represent areas of high density), but does not take place in the halo, as there is little cool gas to collapse into stars. Open clusters are also located primarily on the disk.

Discoveries in the early 21st century have added new dimensions to our understanding of the Milky Way's structure. With the discovery that the disk of the Andromeda Galaxy (M31) extends much farther than previously thought, the possibility of the disk of the Milky Way extending farther is apparent, and this is supported by evidence from the discovery of the Outer Arm extension of the Cygnus Arm and of a similar extension of the Scutum–Centaurus Arm. With the discovery of the Sagittarius Dwarf Elliptical Galaxy came the discovery of a ribbon of galactic debris as the polar orbit of the dwarf and its interaction with the Milky Way tears it apart. Upon the 2004 discovery of a ring of galactic debris in an in-plane orbit around the Milky Way, it was initially believed that the debris was the remnant of a system dubbed the Canis Major Dwarf Galaxy. Other scholars believed it to be due to the Galactic warp, a view which has been supported by more recent evidence as of 2021.

The Sloan Digital Sky Survey of the northern sky shows a huge, diffuse structure (spread across an area about 5,000 times the size of a full moon) within the Milky Way that does not seem to fit current models. The collection of stars rises nearly perpendicular to the plane of the Milky Way's spiral arms. The proposed likely interpretation is that a dwarf galaxy is merging with the Milky Way. This galaxy is tentatively named the Virgo Stellar Stream and is found in the direction of Virgo about 30,000 light-years (9 kpc) away.

==== Gaseous halo ====
In addition to the stellar halo, the Chandra X-ray Observatory, XMM-Newton, and Suzaku have provided evidence that there is also a gaseous halo containing a large amount of hot gas. This halo extends for hundreds of thousands of light-years, much farther than the stellar halo and close to the distance of the Large and Small Magellanic Clouds. The mass of this hot halo is nearly equivalent to the mass of the Milky Way itself. The temperature of this halo gas is between 1 and 2.5 million K (1.8 and 4.5 million °F).

Observations of distant galaxies indicate that the universe had about one-sixth as much baryonic (ordinary) matter as dark matter when it was just a few billion years old. However, only about half of those baryons are accounted for in the modern universe based on observations of nearby galaxies like the Milky Way. If the finding that the mass of the halo is comparable to the mass of the Milky Way is confirmed, it could be the identity of the missing baryons around the Milky Way.

== Contents ==
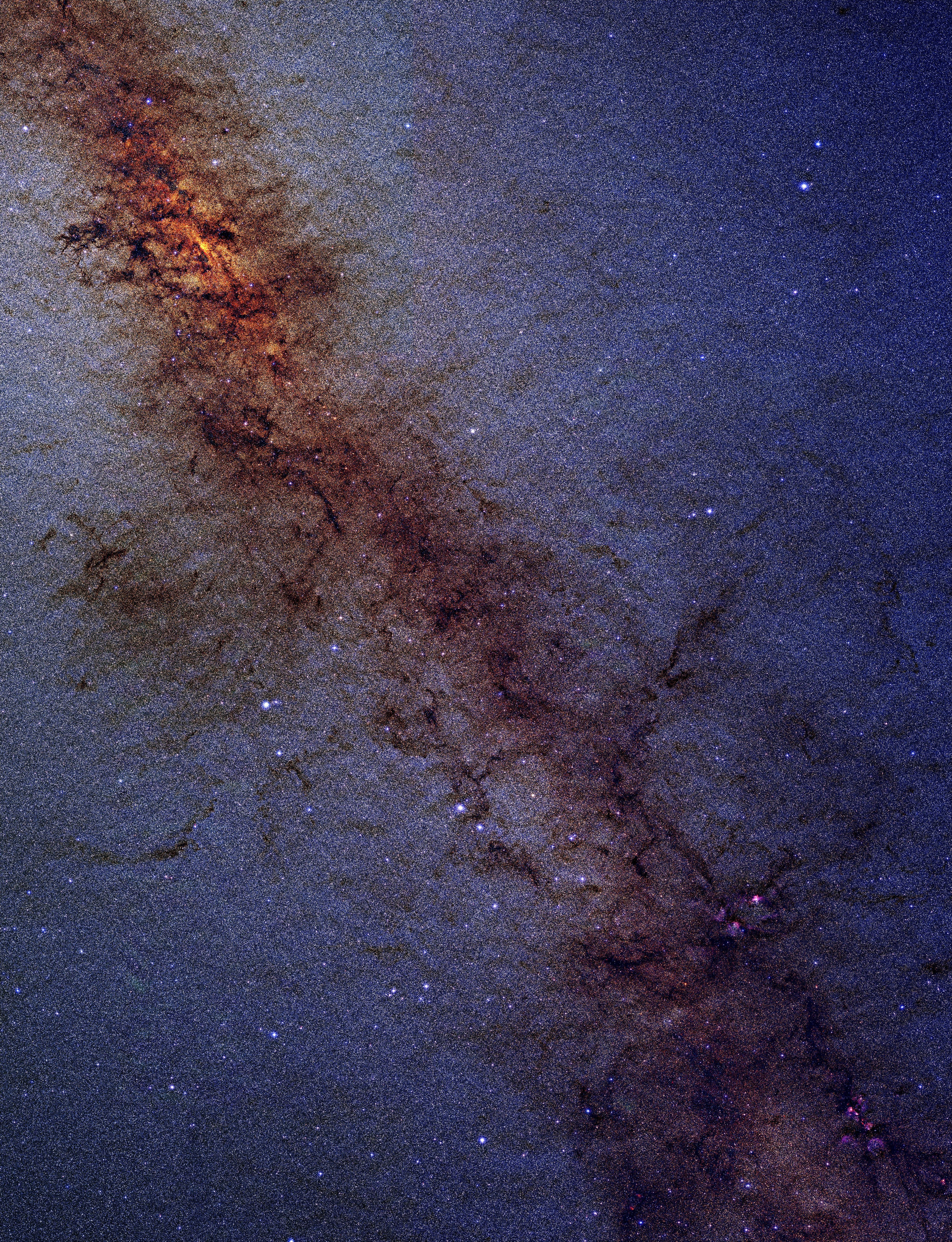
The Galactic Center, as seen by one of the 2MASS infrared telescopes, is located in the bright upper left portion of the image.

The Milky Way contains between 100 and 400 billion stars and at least that many planets. An exact figure would depend on counting the number of very-low-mass stars, which are difficult to detect, especially at distances of more than 300 ly (90 pc) from the Sun. As a comparison, the neighboring Andromeda Galaxy contains an estimated one trillion (10^{12}) stars. The Milky Way may contain ten billion white dwarfs, a billion neutron stars, and a hundred million stellar black holes. (Note: These estimates are very uncertain, as most non-star objects are difficult to detect; for example, black hole estimates range from ten million to one billion.) Filling the space between the stars is a disk of gas and dust called the interstellar medium. This disk has at least a comparable extent in radius to the stars, whereas the thickness of the gas layer ranges from hundreds of light-years for the colder gas to thousands of light-years for the warmer gas.

The disk of stars in the Milky Way does not have a sharp edge beyond which there are no stars. Rather, the concentration of stars decreases with distance from the center of the Milky Way. Beyond a radius of roughly 40,000 light-years (13 kpc) from the center, the number of stars per cubic parsec drops much faster with radius. Surrounding the galactic disk is a spherical galactic halo of stars and globular clusters that extends farther outward, but is limited in size by the orbits of two Milky Way satellites, the Large and Small Magellanic Clouds, whose closest approach to the Galactic Center is about 180,000 ly (55 kpc). At this distance or beyond, the orbits of most halo objects would be disrupted by the Magellanic Clouds. Hence, such objects would probably be ejected from the vicinity of the Milky Way. The integrated absolute visual magnitude of the Milky Way is estimated to be around −20.9. (Note: Karachentsev et al. give a blue absolute magnitude of −20.8. Combined with a color index of 0.55 estimated here, an absolute visual magnitude of −21.35 (−20.8 − 0.55 = −21.35) is obtained. Determining the absolute magnitude of the Milky Way is very difficult because Earth is inside it.)

Both gravitational microlensing and planetary transit observations indicate that there may be at least as many planets bound to stars as there are stars in the Milky Way, and microlensing measurements indicate that there are more rogue planets not bound to host stars than there are stars. The Milky Way contains an average of at least one planet per star, resulting in 100–400 billion planets, according to a January 2013 study of the five-planet star system Kepler-32 by the Kepler space observatory. A different January 2013 analysis of Kepler data estimated that at least 17 billion Earth-sized exoplanets reside in the Milky Way.

In November 2013, astronomers reported, based on Kepler space telescope data, that there could be as many as 40 billion Earth-sized planets orbiting in the habitable zones of Sun-like stars and red dwarfs within the Milky Way. 11 billion of these estimated planets may be orbiting Sun-like stars. The nearest exoplanet may be 4.2 light-years away, orbiting the red dwarf Proxima Centauri, according to a 2016 study. Such Earth-sized planets may be more numerous than gas giants, though harder to detect at great distances given their small size. Besides exoplanets, "exocomets", comets beyond the Solar System, have also been detected and may be common in the Milky Way. More recently, in November 2020, over 300 million habitable exoplanets are estimated to exist in the Milky Way Galaxy.

When compared to other more distant galaxies in the universe, the Milky Way galaxy has a below average amount of neutrino luminosity making our galaxy a "neutrino desert".

== Formation ==
A galaxy color–magnitude diagram showing the red sequence (old galaxies, typically elliptical galaxies), the green valley (where the Milky Way is believed to be in), and the blue cloud (young galaxies, typically spiral galaxies)

The oldest stars in the Milky Way probably formed shortly after the Dark Ages of the early universe. The oldest stars are spherically distributed in the galaxy, suggesting it started out in a spherical shape. As the mass of the early galaxy condensed any small rotation about the center was amplified by conservation of angular momentum, causing the spherical shape to flatten into a spiral disk. Later generations of stars formed in this spiral disk. Most younger stars, including the Sun, are observed to be in the disk.

Assuming the Milky Way is similar to other galaxies, 40% of its mass may have come from other galaxies. Since the first stars began to form, the Milky Way has grown through both galaxy mergers (particularly early in the Milky Way's growth) and accretion of gas directly from the Galactic halo. The Milky Way is currently accreting material from several small galaxies, including two of its largest satellite galaxies, the Large and Small Magellanic Clouds, through the Magellanic Stream. Direct accretion of gas is observed in high-velocity clouds like the Smith Cloud.

Cosmological simulations indicate that, 11 billion years ago, it merged with a particularly large galaxy that has been labeled the Kraken. Properties of the Milky Way such as stellar mass, angular momentum, and metallicity in its outermost regions suggest it has undergone no mergers with large galaxies in the last 10 billion years. This lack of recent major mergers is unusual among spiral galaxies of a similar type. Its neighbor, the Andromeda Galaxy, appears to have a more typical history, shaped by more recent mergers with relatively large galaxies.

According to recent studies, the Milky Way as well as the Andromeda Galaxy lie in what in the galaxy color–magnitude diagram is known as the "green valley", a region populated by galaxies in transition from the "blue cloud" (galaxies actively forming new stars) to the "red sequence" (galaxies that lack star formation). Star-formation activity in green valley galaxies is slowing as they run out of star-forming gas in the interstellar medium. In simulated galaxies with similar properties, star formation will typically have been extinguished within about five billion years from now, even accounting for the expected, short-term increase in the rate of star formation due to the collision between both the Milky Way and the Andromeda Galaxy. Measurements of other galaxies similar to the Milky Way suggest it is among the reddest and brightest spiral galaxies that are still forming new stars and it is just slightly bluer than the bluest red sequence galaxies.

=== Age and cosmological history ===
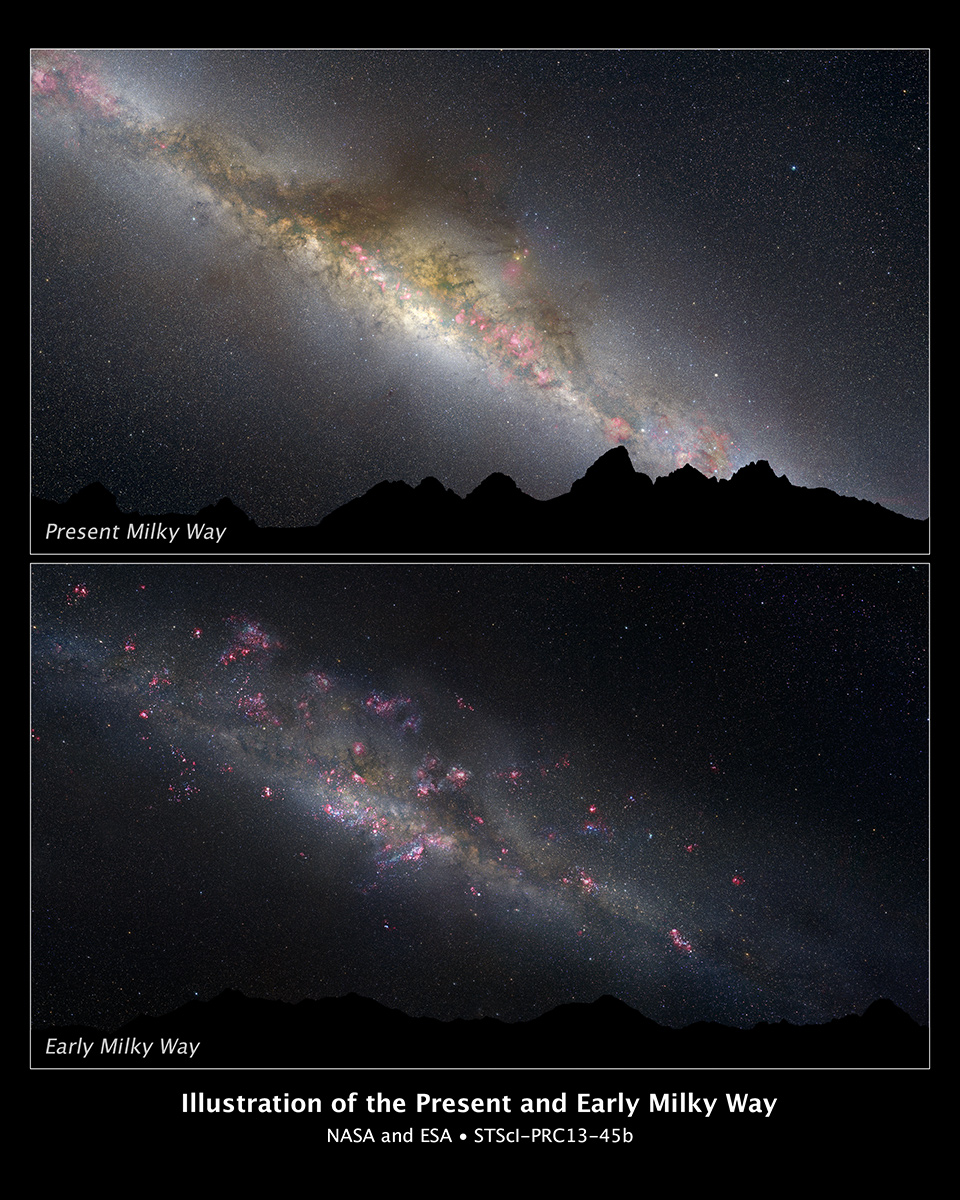
Comparison of the night sky with the night sky of a hypothetical planet within the Milky Way 10 billion years ago, at an age of about 3.6 billion years and 5 billion years before the Sun formed

Globular clusters are among the oldest objects in the Milky Way, thereby setting a lower limit on the age of the Milky Way. The ages of individual stars in the Milky Way can be estimated by measuring the abundance of long-lived radioactive elements such as thorium-232 and uranium-238, then comparing the results to estimates of their original abundance, a technique called nucleocosmochronology. These yield values of about 12.5 ± 3 billion years for CS 31082-001 and 13.8 ± 4 billion years for BD +17° 3248.

Once a white dwarf forms, it begins to cool radiatively, and its surface temperature steadily drops. By measuring the temperatures of the coolest of these white dwarfs and comparing them to their expected initial temperatures, an age estimate can be made. With this technique, the age of the globular cluster M4 was estimated as 12.7 ± 0.7 billion years. Age estimates for the oldest of these clusters yield a best-fit age of 12.6 billion years and a 95% confidence upper limit of 16 billion years.

In November 2018, astronomers reported the discovery of one of the universe's oldest stars. About 13.5 billion years old, 2MASS J18082002-5104378 B is a tiny ultra metal-poor (UMP) star made almost entirely of materials released from the Big Bang, and is possibly one of the first stars. The discovery of the star in the Milky Way Galaxy suggests that the galaxy may be at least 3 billion years older than previously thought.

Several individual stars have been found in the Milky Way's halo with measured ages very close to the 13.80-billion-year age of the universe. In 2007, a star in the galactic halo, HE 1523-0901, was estimated to be about 13.2 billion years old. As the oldest known object in the Milky Way at that time, this measurement placed a lower limit on the age of the Milky Way. This estimate was made using the UV-Visual Echelle Spectrograph of the Very Large Telescope to measure the relative strengths of spectral lines caused by the presence of thorium and other elements created by the R-process. The line strengths yield abundances of different elemental isotopes, from which an estimate of the age of the star can be derived using nucleocosmochronology. Another star, HD 140283, has been estimated at either 13.7 ± 0.7 billion years, 12.2 ± 0.6 billion years, or 12.0 ± 0.5 billion years.

According to observations using adaptive optics to correct for Earth's atmospheric distortion, stars in the galaxy's bulge are about 12.8 billion years old.

The age of stars in the galactic thin disk has also been estimated using nucleocosmochronology. Measurements of thin disk stars yield an estimate that the thin disk formed 8.8 ± 1.7 billion years ago. These measurements suggest there was a hiatus of almost 5 billion years between the formation of the galactic halo and the thin disk. Recent analysis of the chemical signatures of thousands of stars suggests that stellar formation might have dropped by an order of magnitude at the time of disk formation, 10 to 8 billion years ago, when interstellar gas was too hot to form new stars at the same rate as before.

The satellite galaxies surrounding the Milky Way are not randomly distributed but appear to result from the breakup of a larger system, producing a ring structure 500,000 light-years in diameter and 50,000 light-years wide. Close encounters between galaxies, like that expected in 4 billion years with the Andromeda Galaxy, can rip off huge tails of gas, which, over time can coalesce to form dwarf galaxies in a ring at an arbitrary angle to the main disc.

== Astrography ==
=== Sun's location and neighborhood ===
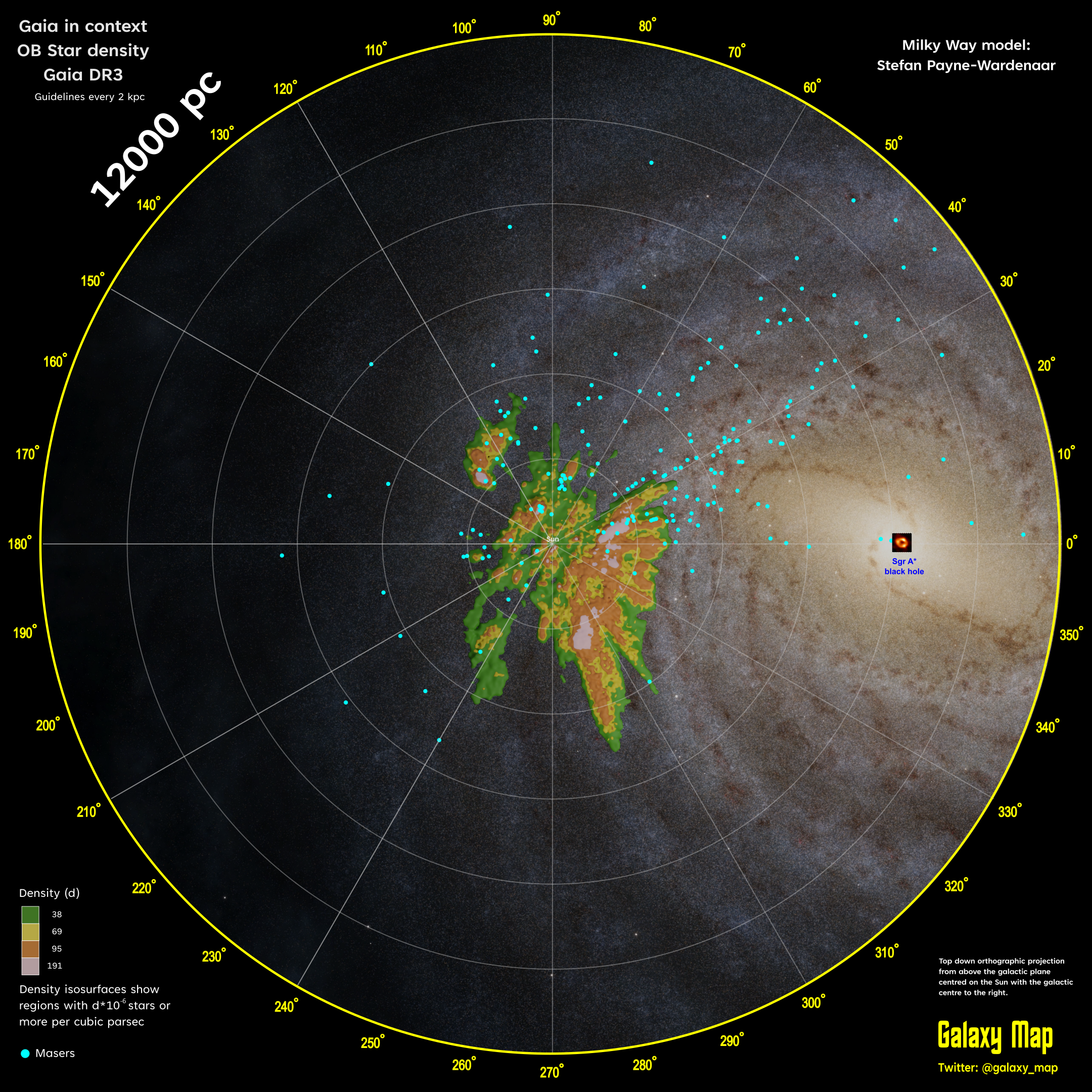
Map of stars cataloged by the Gaia release in 2021, overlaid on artist's conception of the Milky Way's overall shape

The Solar System is located at a radius of about 27,000 light-years (8.3 kpc) from the Galactic Center, near the inner edge of the Orion Arm, within the Local Fluff of the Local Bubble, between the Radcliffe wave and Split linear structures (formerly Gould Belt). Based upon studies of stellar orbits around Sgr A* by Gillessen et al. (2016), the Sun lies at an estimated distance of 27.14 ± 0.46 kly (8.32 ± 0.14 kpc) from the Galactic Center. Boehle et al. (2016) found a smaller value of 25.64 ± 0.46 kly (7.86 ± 0.14 kpc), also using a star orbit analysis. The Sun is currently 5–30 parsecs (16–98 ly) above, or north of, the central plane of the Galactic disk. The distance between the local arm and the next arm out, the Perseus Arm, is about 2,000 parsecs (6,500 ly). The Solar System is located in the Milky Way's galactic habitable zone.

There are about 208 stars brighter than absolute magnitude 8.5 within a sphere with a radius of 15 parsecs (49 ly) from the Sun, giving a density of one star per 69 cubic parsecs, or one star per 2,360 cubic light-years. On the other hand, there are 64 known stars (of any magnitude, not counting 4 brown dwarfs) within 5 parsecs (16 ly) of the Sun, giving a density of about one star per 8.2 cubic parsecs, or one per 284 cubic light-years. This illustrates the fact that there are far more faint stars than bright stars: in the entire sky, there are about 500 stars brighter than apparent magnitude 4 but 15.5 million stars brighter than apparent magnitude 14.

The apex of the Sun's way, or the solar apex, is the direction that the Sun travels through the local standard of rest in the Milky Way. The general direction of the Sun's galactic motion is towards the star Deneb near the constellation of Cygnus, at an angle of roughly 90 sky degrees to the direction of the Galactic Center. The Sun's orbit about the Milky Way is expected to be roughly elliptical, with perturbations from the Galactic spiral arms and non-uniform mass distributions. In addition, the Sun passes through the galactic plane approximately 2.7 times per orbit. This is similar to how a simple harmonic oscillator works with no drag force (damping) term. These oscillations were until recently thought to coincide with mass lifeform extinction periods on Earth. A reanalysis of the effects of the Sun's transit through the spiral structure based on CO data has failed to find a correlation.

It takes the Solar System about 240 million years to complete one orbit of the Milky Way (a galactic year), so the Sun is thought to have completed 18–20 orbits during its lifetime and 1/1250 of a revolution since the origin of humans. The orbital speed of the Solar System about the center of the Milky Way is approximately 220 km/s (490,000 mph) or 0.073% of the speed of light. The Sun moves through the heliosphere at 84,000 km/h (52,000 mph). At this speed, it takes around 1,400 years for the Solar System to travel a distance of 1 light-year, or 8 days to travel 1 astronomical unit (AU). The Solar System is headed in the direction of the zodiacal constellation Scorpius.

=== Galactic quadrants ===
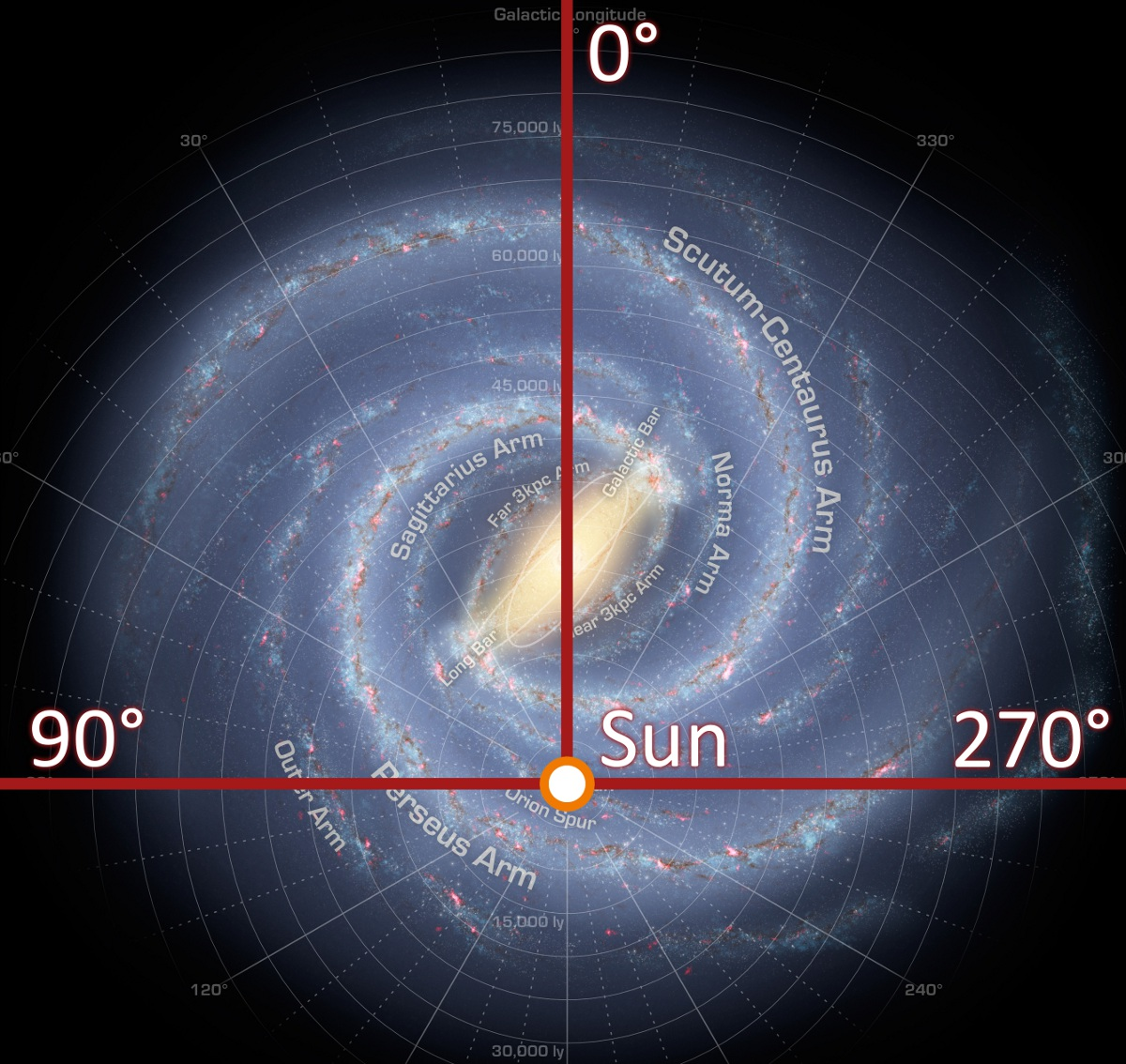
A diagram of the Sun's location in the Milky Way; the angles represent longitudes in the galactic coordinate system

A galactic quadrant, or quadrant of the Milky Way, refers to one of four circular sectors in the division of the Milky Way. In astronomical practice, the delineation of the galactic quadrants is based upon the galactic coordinate system, which places the Sun as the origin of the mapping system.

Quadrants are described using ordinals – for example, "1st galactic quadrant", "second galactic quadrant", or "third quadrant of the Milky Way". Viewing from the north galactic pole with 0° (zero degrees) as the ray that runs starting from the Sun and through the Galactic Center, the quadrants are:

Galactic quadrant	Galactic longitude (ℓ)	Reference
1st	0° ≤ ℓ ≤ 90°
2nd	90° ≤ ℓ ≤ 180°
3rd	180° ≤ ℓ ≤ 270°
4th	270° ≤ ℓ ≤ 360° (360° ≅ 0°)

The galactic longitude (ℓ) increases in the counter-clockwise direction (positive rotation) as viewed from north of the Galactic Center (a point several hundred thousand light-years distant from Earth in the direction of the constellation Coma Berenices); if viewed from south of the Galactic Center (a point similarly distant in the constellation Sculptor), ℓ would increase in the clockwise direction (negative rotation).

=== Intergalactic neighborhood ===
A diagram of the galaxies in the Local Group relative to the Milky Way

The position of the Local Group within the Laniakea Supercluster

The Milky Way and the Andromeda Galaxy are a binary system of giant spiral galaxies belonging to a group of 50 closely bound galaxies known as the Local Group, surrounded by a Local Void, itself being part of the Local Sheet and in turn the Virgo Supercluster. Surrounding the Virgo Supercluster are several voids, devoid of many galaxies, the Microscopium Void to the "north", the Sculptor Void to the "left", the Boötes Void to the "right", and the Canes-Major Void to the "south". These voids change shape over time, forming filamentary structures in galaxies. The Virgo Supercluster, for instance, is being drawn towards the Great Attractor, which in turn forms part of a greater structure, called Laniakea.

Two smaller galaxies and several dwarf galaxies in the Local Group orbit the Milky Way. The largest of these is the Large Magellanic Cloud with a diameter of 32,200 light-years. It has a close companion, the Small Magellanic Cloud. The Magellanic Stream is a stream of neutral hydrogen gas extending from these two small galaxies across 100° of the sky. The stream is thought to have been dragged from the Magellanic Clouds in tidal interactions with the Milky Way. Some of the dwarf galaxies orbiting the Milky Way are Canis Major Dwarf (the closest), Sagittarius Dwarf Elliptical Galaxy, Ursa Minor Dwarf, Sculptor Dwarf, Sextans Dwarf, Fornax Dwarf, and Leo I Dwarf.

The smallest dwarf galaxies of the Milky Way are only 500 light-years in diameter. These include Carina Dwarf, Draco Dwarf, and Leo II Dwarf. There may still be undetected dwarf galaxies dynamically bound to the Milky Way, as supported by the detection of nine new Milky Way satellites in a relatively small patch of the night sky in 2015. The Milky Way has already absorbed some dwarf galaxies, such as the progenitor of Omega Centauri.

In 2005 with further confirmation in 2012 researchers reported that most satellite galaxies of the Milky Way lie in a very large disk and orbit in the same direction. This came as a surprise: according to standard cosmology, satellite galaxies should form in dark matter halos and be widely distributed, moving in random directions. This discrepancy is still not explained.

In January 2006, researchers reported that the heretofore unexplained warp in the disk of the Milky Way has now been mapped and found to be a ripple or vibration set up by the Large and Small Magellanic Clouds as they orbit the Milky Way, causing vibrations when they pass through its edges. Previously, these two galaxies, which together account for about 2% of the Milky Way's mass, were considered too small to influence the Milky Way. However, in a computer model, the movement of these two galaxies creates a dark matter wake that amplifies their influence on the larger Milky Way.

Current measurements suggest the Andromeda Galaxy is approaching the Milky Way at 100 to 140 km/s (220,000 to 310,000 mph). In 4.3 billion years, there may be an Andromeda–Milky Way collision, depending on the importance of unknown lateral components to the galaxies' relative motion. If they collide, the chance of individual stars colliding with each other is extremely low, but instead the two galaxies will merge to form a single elliptical galaxy or perhaps a large disk galaxy over the course of about six billion years.

== See also ==
- Baade's Window
- Galactic Center GeV excess
- Oort constants
