= (α/Fe) versus (Fe/H) diagram =

Graph used in astrophysics

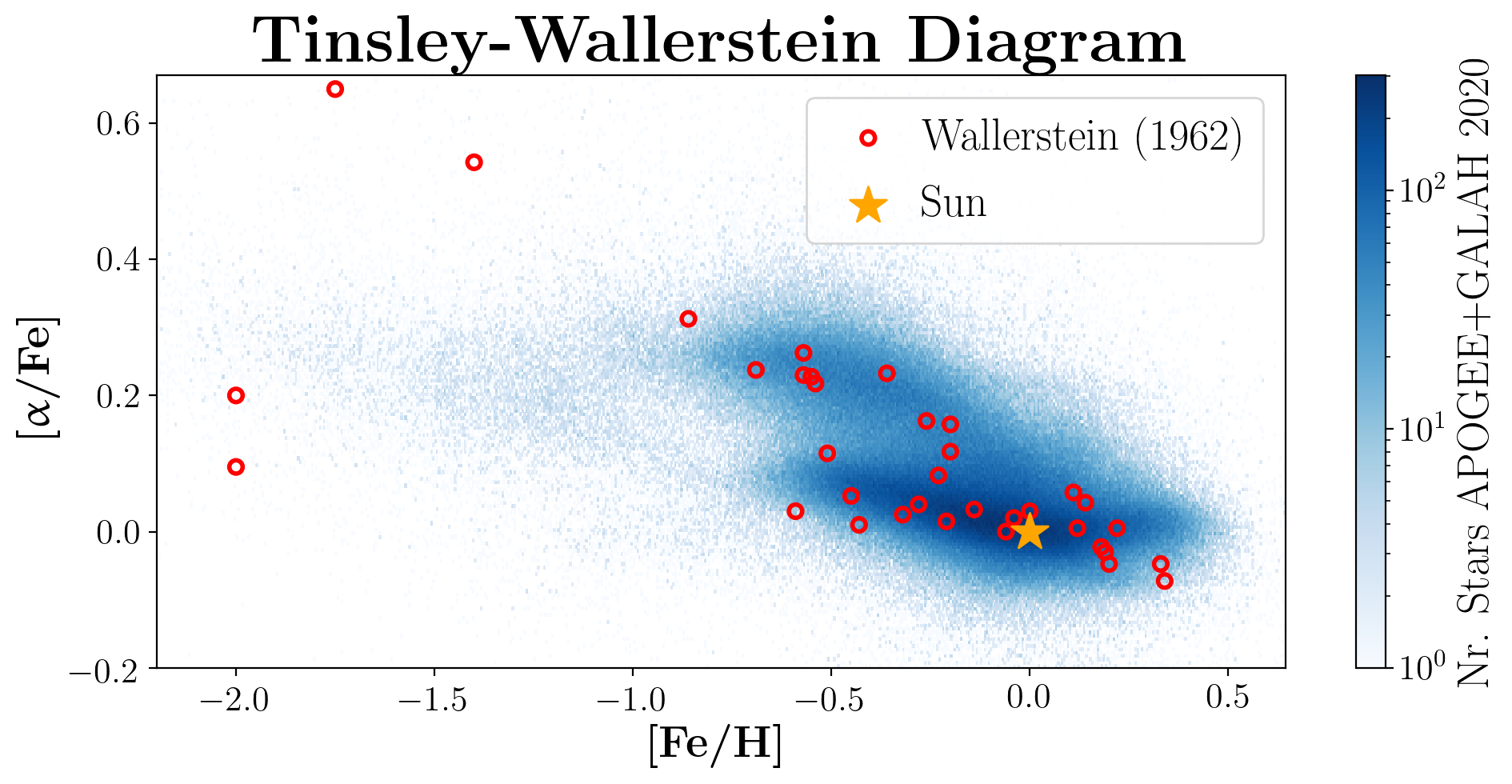
The diagram shows the iron abundance, [Fe/H], on the x-axis and the abundance of alpha process elements, [α/Fe], on the y-axis. The data from Wallerstein (1962) is shown as red circles on top of the 2020 public data from the large scale stellar spectroscopic surveys APOGEE (DR16) and GALAH (DR3).

The [α/Fe] versus [Fe/H] diagram is a type of graph commonly used in stellar and galactic astrophysics. It shows the logarithmic ratio number densities of diagnostic elements in stellar atmospheres compared to the solar value. The x-axis represents the abundance of iron (Fe) vs. hydrogen (H), that is, [Fe/H]. The y-axis represents the combination of one or several of the alpha process elements (O, Ne, Mg, Si, S, Ar, Ca, and Ti) compared to iron (Fe), denoted as [α/Fe].

These diagrams enable the assessment of nucleosynthesis channels and galactic evolution in samples of stars as a first-order approximation. They are among the most commonly used tools for Galactic population analysis of the Milky Way. The diagrams use abundance ratios normalised to the Sun, (placing the Sun at (0,0) in the diagram). This normalisation allows for the easy identification of stars in the Galactic stellar high-alpha disk (historically known as the Galactic stellar thick disk), typically enhanced in [α/Fe], and stars in the Galactic stellar low-alpha disk (historically known as the Galactic stellar thin disk), with [α/Fe] values as low as the Sun. Furthermore, the diagrams facilitate the identification of stars that are likely born in times or environments significantly different from the stellar disk. This includes metal-poor stars (with low [Fe/H] < -1), which likely belong to the stellar halo or accreted features.

== History ==
George Wallerstein and Beatrice Tinsley were early users of the [α/Fe] vs. [Fe/H] diagrams. In 1962, George Wallerstein noted, based on the analysis of a sample of 34 Galactic field stars, that "the [α/Fe] distribution seems to consist of a normal distribution about zero, plus seven stars with [α/Fe] > 0.20. These may be called [α/Fe]-rich stars."

In 1979, Beatrice Tinsley used the interpretation of these observations with the theory throughout her work on Stellar lifetimes and abundance ratios in chemical evolution. While discussing oxygen as one of the alpha-process elements, she wrote, 'As anticipated, the observed [O/Fe] excess in metal-poor stars can be explained qualitatively if much of the iron comes from SN I. [...] The essential ingredient in accounting for the [O/Fe] excess is that a significant fraction of oxygen must come from stars with shorter lives than those that make much of the iron.' In 1980, in Evolution of the Stars and Gas in Galaxies, she said, 'Relative abundances of elements heavier than helium provide information on both nucleosynthesis and galactic evolution [...].'

These relative abundances and the diagrams depicting different relative abundances are now among the most commonly used diagnostic tools of Galactic Archaeology. Bensby et al. (2014) used them to explore the Milky Way disk in the solar neighbourhood. Hayden et al. (2015) used them for their work on the chemical cartography of our Milky Way disk. It has been suggested that the diagram be named for Tinsley and Wallerstein.

== Notation ==
The diagram depicts two astrophysical quantities of stars, their iron abundance relative to hydrogen [Fe/H] - a tracer of stellar metallicity - and the enrichment of alpha process elements relative to iron, [α/Fe].

The iron abundance is noted as the logarithm of the ratio of a star's iron abundance compared to that of the Sun:

$$[\ce{Fe}/\ce{H}] = \log_{10}{\left(\frac{N_{\ce{Fe}}}{N_{\ce{H}}}\right)_\star} - \log_{10}{\left(\frac{N_{\ce{Fe}}}{N_{\ce{H}}}\right)_\odot},$$

where $N_\ce{Fe}$ and $N_\ce{H}$ are the number of iron and hydrogen atoms per unit of volume respectively.

It traces the contributions of galactic chemical evolution to the nucleosynthesis of iron. These differ for the birth environments of stars, based on their star formation history and star burst strengths. Major syntheses channels of iron are supernovae Ia and II.

The ratio of alpha process elements to iron, also known as the alpha-enhancement, is written as the logarithm of the alpha process elements O, Ne, Mg, Si, S, Ar, Ca, and Ti to Fe compared to that of the Sun:

$$[\alpha/\ce{Fe}] = \langle \ce{[X/Fe]}\rangle = \left\langle \log_{10}{\left(\frac{N_\ce{X}}{N_\ce{Fe}}\right)_\star} - \log_{10}{\left(\frac{N_\ce{X}}{N_{\ce{Fe}}}\right)_\odot} \right\rangle \text{, where } \ce{X} \in \ce{[O, Ne, Mg, Si, S, Ar, Ca, Ti]}$$
and

where $N_\ce{X}$ and $N_\ce{Fe}$ are the number of the alpha process elements $\ce{X}$ and iron atoms per unit of volume respectively.

In practise, not all of these elements can be measured in stellar spectra and the alpha-enhancement is therefore commonly reported as a simple or error-weighted average of the individual alpha process element abundances.

== See also ==
- Alpha-enhanced stars with anomalous ages
