= Alpha-enhanced stars with anomalous ages =

Alpha-enhanced stars with young age indicators

Alpha-enhanced stars with young ages are stars in the Milky Way that exhibit enhanced abundances of α-capture elements (typically expressed as high [α/Fe]) while simultaneously showing age indicators that appear inconsistent with the standard expectation that α-enhanced stellar populations are predominantly old. This phenomenon is discussed in the context of Galactic archaeology and challenges simple interpretations of age–abundance relations in the Galactic disk.

The apparent age anomalies have been reported for both evolved stars (primarily red-giant-branch stars with asteroseismic age estimates) and unevolved or mildly evolved stars (dwarfs and subgiants), where lithium abundances and stellar rotation provide additional age diagnostics.

The central question is whether such stars are genuinely young objects formed from α-enhanced gas, or whether their young age indicators arise from non-standard stellar or binary evolution processes—such as mass transfer or mergers—that cause intrinsically old stars to appear younger (rejuvenation).

== Background ==
In the Milky Way disk, enhanced [α/Fe] is traditionally interpreted as a signature of early star formation, when chemical enrichment was dominated by core-collapse supernovae prior to the delayed contribution of iron from Type Ia supernovae.

This paradigm has been supported by high-resolution spectroscopic studies of nearby stars with well-determined ages, which demonstrate a strong correlation between enhanced [α/Fe] ratios and old stellar ages.. Consequently, the discovery of α-enhanced stars with apparently young ages has prompted re-examination of age diagnostics and evolutionary assumptions.

== Observational identification ==
=== Red giants ===
The first widely discussed examples of α-enhanced stars with young age estimates were identified among red giants observed by CoRoT and APOGEE, using asteroseismology to infer stellar masses and ages. Subsequent large spectroscopic surveys combined with asteroseismic data (e.g., APOKASC, K2, and Gaia-based samples) confirmed the presence of a population commonly referred to as young α-rich giants. These stars typically exhibit α-enhanced abundance patterns similar to those of old thick-disk stars, but inferred ages of only a few gigayears when interpreted under single-star evolution models.

=== Dwarfs and subgiants ===
Alpha-enhanced stars with young age indicators have also been identified among dwarfs and subgiants, where age constraints can be supplemented by lithium abundances and stellar rotation.

In unevolved stars, lithium abundance and stellar rotation provide independent diagnostics of youth and evolutionary history that are largely unavailable for red-giant samples, owing to lithium depletion and rotational spin-down during post-main-sequence evolution.

Among dwarfs with extreme [α/Fe] ratios, a subset exhibits lithium abundances comparable to those of young low-α thin-disk stars at similar effective temperatures, surface gravities, and metallicities, arguing against a merger or mass-transfer origin in these cases. These stars occupy the same main-sequence and subgiant regions of the Hertzsprung–Russell diagram as [α/Fe]-normal stars of comparable age and metallicity, and show no evidence for anomalous stellar masses or evolutionary states.

Kinematic properties derived from Gaia astrometry indicate that many such objects have relatively low orbital eccentricities and modest vertical excursions, consistent with thin-disk populations rather than the dynamically hotter α-enhanced populations traditionally associated with old stellar ages.

Additional constraints from stellar rotation and more stringent vetting against close binaries have further strengthened the case for a small number of α-enhanced dwarfs being genuinely young, while also highlighting that multiple evolutionary channels are likely to coexist within the broader population of α-enhanced stars with anomalous age indicators.

== Age diagnostics and limitations ==
Age estimates for field stars rely on multiple methods, each sensitive to different physical assumptions and subject to distinct systematics.

=== Isochrone- and mass-based ages ===
For evolved stars, masses inferred from spectroscopy or asteroseismology are often converted into ages using stellar-evolution models. Any process that alters the stellar mass after formation—such as mass accretion or mergers—can bias such ages toward artificially young values.

=== Asteroseismology ===
Asteroseismic ages, derived from oscillation frequencies and stellar densities, provide precise mass estimates for red giants. However, because these ages depend directly on mass, they are particularly sensitive to binary mass transfer and merger events, which can inflate stellar masses without reflecting true age.

=== Lithium and rotation ===
In unevolved stars, lithium abundance and stellar rotation provide complementary age diagnostics. Lithium is easily destroyed during stellar mergers and mass-transfer events, making its presence in α-enhanced dwarfs a key constraint against certain rejuvenation scenarios. Stellar rotation, interpreted through gyrochronology, further aids in distinguishing young stars from spun-up binary products, although tidal interactions in close binaries remain a potential contaminant.

=== Kinematics as a population-age proxy ===
Stellar kinematics are frequently used as a statistical proxy for age in Galactic archaeology, as older stellar populations tend to exhibit larger velocity dispersions, higher orbital eccentricities, and greater vertical excursions from the Galactic plane. While kinematics do not provide precise ages for individual stars, they offer valuable population-level constraints on stellar ages and Galactic evolution.

In studies of α-enhanced stars with anomalous age indicators, kinematic analyses have shown that many young α-rich giants occupy phase-space regions similar to those of old α-enhanced (thick-disk) populations rather than to low-α thin-disk stars of comparable inferred age. This has been interpreted as supporting scenarios involving binary interaction or stellar mergers that modify apparent ages without requiring recent star formation.

By contrast, some α-enhanced dwarfs selected using lithium and rotation diagnostics exhibit kinematics more consistent with thin-disk populations, highlighting potential differences between dwarf- and giant-based samples and suggesting that multiple formation pathways may coexist.

== Proposed explanations ==
Several non-exclusive explanations have been proposed to account for α-enhanced stars with anomalous ages.

=== Binary mass transfer ===
Binary interaction, particularly mass transfer from an evolved companion, can increase stellar mass and alter surface abundances. Observed enhancements in s-process elements and deviations in C/N-related abundance ratios among some young α-rich giants have been interpreted as signatures of such processes.

=== Stellar mergers and rejuvenation ===
Stellar mergers can produce higher-mass stars whose inferred ages are biased young. This mechanism is often discussed as an explanation for young α-rich giants whose kinematics and chemical patterns resemble those of old α-enhanced populations, analogous to blue stragglers in star clusters.

=== Genuine young α-enhanced stars ===
An alternative interpretation is that a subset of α-enhanced stars are genuinely young, having formed from α-rich gas under specific Galactic conditions. Evidence supporting this scenario has been presented primarily for dwarf stars, based on lithium abundances, rotation, and kinematics that are difficult to reconcile with merger or mass-transfer origins in all cases.

== See also ==
- Alpha process
- Thin disk
- Thick disk
