= Syracuse Stage =

Non-profit performing arts theater in Syracuse, New York

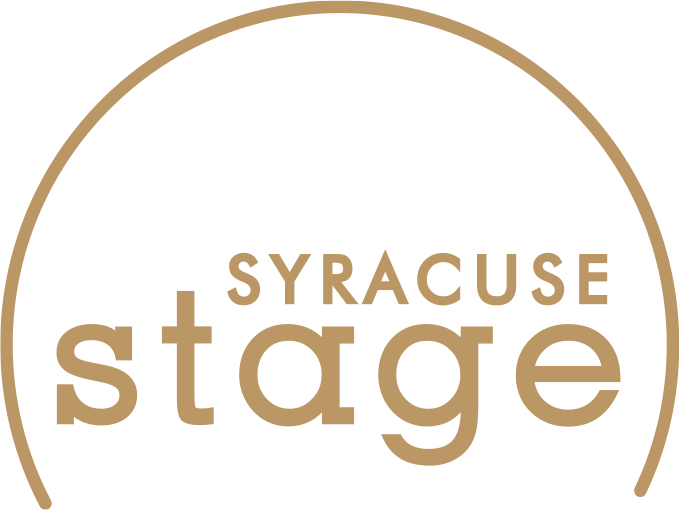
- Interactive map of Syracuse Stage
- Location: Syracuse, New York, U.S.
- Coordinates: 43.0467°N 76.1382°W
- Event: Non-profit theater

Construction
- Opened: 1974

Website
- syracusestage.org

Syracuse Stage is a professional non-profit theater company in Syracuse, New York, United States. It is the premier professional theater in Central New York. Each year, it offers several productions, including multiple collaborations between Syracuse Stage and the drama department of the Syracuse University College of Visual and Performing Arts.

Syracuse Stage is a constituent of the Theatre Communications Group and a member of the League of Resident Theatres, the University Hill Corporation, the Arts and Cultural Leadership Alliance, and the East Genesee Regent Association.

== History ==
The Syracuse Stage was founded in 1974 by Arthur Storch, who became its first artistic director. The company grew out of the Syracuse Repertory Theatre that was founded in the mid-1960s by founders Marlow G. Burt, Robert B. D'Angelo and Rex Henriot. The Repertory Theatre started trial seasons in 1964 and began its first official season in 1967 in a building formerly occupied by the Reagent movie theater.

The archbold theater was built in 1980. The facility named after John Dana Archbold (University trustee 1976—1993 and the grandson of John D. Archbold), cost $1.3 million.

In the early 1990s, Tazewell Thompson was artistic director. Robert Moss and Timothy Bond have also served as artistic director. In 2016, Robert Hupp became artistic director.

In 2023, the theater received a $1 million donation from Julie Lutz & George Wallerstein, to establish the Julie Lutz New Play Development Fund, which will help develop new productions for the company.

=== Ties to Syracuse University Department of Drama ===
While the Syracuse Stage an independent organization, it was started by Syracuse University professor Arthur Storch and since its inception, has had strong ties to SU's department of Drama. It collaborates with the SU Department of Drama and houses Syracuse Univeversity undergraduate productions as well as independent productions. It also receives annual grants from the university. In 2009, the university contributed 40% towards the annual budget of $5.1 million.

== Facilities ==
The Syracuse Stage has three theaters: Storch, Clark, and Archbold – and a pavilion. The Sutton Pavilion is a cabaret space, often utilized for late-night entertainment.

The Arthur Storch theater is named for the founding artistic director of the stage. The Storch theater seats ~200–250 people and can be configured as a proscenium, thrust, or avenue stage.

The Clark Theater is a Black Box Theatre with 49 seats for audience members in a felixble configurations, often used for short plays, workshops, and experimental efforts.

The John D. Archbold Theater is a 499-seat proscenium theater. The theatre has a 36–40 feet wide proscenium; the stage is 30 feet deep. It is lit by 215 Source Fours, 16 Fresnel lanterns, 36 par cans, and 22 16x22 Lekolites.
