= OGC 586 =

Galaxy in the constellation Ursa Major

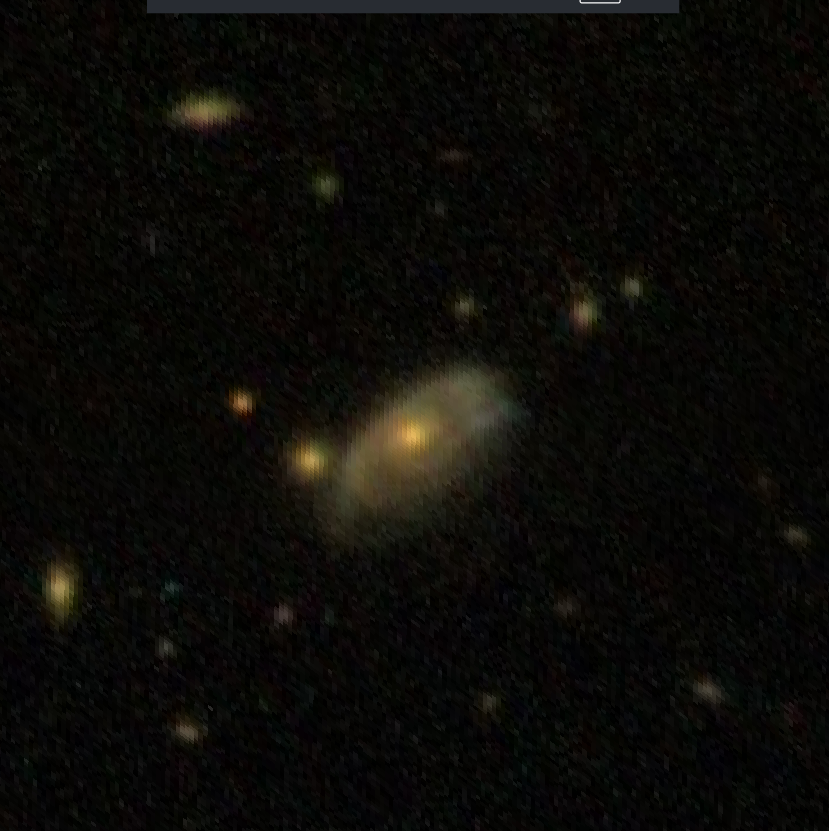
- SDSS image of OGC 586

Observation data (J2000.0 epoch)
- Constellation: Ursa Major
- Right ascension: 11^{h} 53^{m} 56.21^{s}
- Declination: +49° 23′ 55.48″
- Redshift: 0.166728
- Heliocentric radial velocity: 49,984 ± 5 km/s
- Distance: 2,407.3 ± 168.5 Mly (738.08 ± 51.67 Mpc)
- Group or cluster: OGC 586 Cluster
- magnitude (J): 14.11

Characteristics
- Type: BCG, Sy2
- Size: ~466,000 ly (143.0 kpc) (estimated)

Other designations
- 2MASX J11535621+4923562, ASK 219702.0, LEDA 2341821, MAPS-NGP O_171_0049418, ILT J115356.2+492355.0, WHL J115356.2+492356 BCG

OGC 586 also known as 2MASX J11535621+4923562, is a massive spiral galaxy located in the constellation of Ursa Major. The redshift of the galaxy is estimated to be (z) 0.166 and it is classified as a super spiral galaxy; a class of star-forming disk galaxies that are found to be much more massive.

== Description ==
OGC 586 is a brightest cluster galaxy (BCG) of the galaxy cluster called the OGC 586 Cluster located at the same redshift and named after the galaxy itself. The apparent luminosity has been estimated as L_{r} = 2.8 and the total isophotal diameter has been calculated as 90.2 kiloparsecs. In addition, it is also categorized as a Seyfert galaxy of Type 2, with an active galactic nucleus (AGN). The bulge fraction ratio has been estimated as B/T = 0.17, with the galactic disk showing a disk inclination of 63° and orientated at a position angle of 144°. The disk exponential scale length is R_{d} = 15.67.

The total star formation rate of the galaxy is 1.58 M_{☉} per year based on a calculation of a 12 micrometer band system by Wide-field Infrared Survey Explorer (WISE) with the total mass of the stars estimated to be 11.64 M_{☉} based on its W-1 band luminosity. Studies also found it is located in a dense galaxy environment with at least 14 or more companions within a 150 kiloparsec radius.

The inclination angle of OGC 586 is 66° based on the calculation of its z-band axial ratio. The major axis position angle is orientated at 128°, with the flat part of the rotation curve displaying a velocity of 338 ± 27 kilometers per second. The galaxy has a compact disk of cold gas. The total mass of the gas is 10.8 M_{☉}. The disk may also be warped, based on a change of its regular rotation, with the deprojected maximum rotation speed being v_{max} = 305 kilometers per seconds.
