= Nucleocosmochronology =

Technique to determine timescales for astrophysical objects and events

Nucleocosmochronology, or nuclear cosmochronology, is a technique used to determine timescales for astrophysical objects and events based on observed ratios of radioactive heavy elements and their decay products. It is similar in many respects to radiometric dating, in which trace radioactive impurities were selectively incorporated into materials when they were formed.

To calculate the age of formation of astronomical objects, the observed ratios of abundances of heavy radioactive and stable nuclides are compared to the primordial ratios predicted by nucleosynthesis theory. Both radioactive elements and their decay products matter, and some important elements include the long-lived radioactive nuclei Th-232, U-235, and U-238, all formed by the r-process. The process has been compared to radiocarbon dating. The age of the objects are determined by placing constraints on the duration of nucleosynthesis in the galaxy.

Nucleocosmochronology has been employed to determine the age of the Sun (4.57±0.02 billion years) and of the Galactic thin disk (8.8±1.8 billion years), among other objects. It has also been used to estimate the age of the Milky Way itself by studying Cayrel's Star in the Galactic halo, which due to its low metallicity, is believed to have formed early in the history of the Galaxy.

Limiting factors in its precision are the quality of observations of faint stars and the uncertainty of the primordial abundances of r-process elements.

== History ==
The first use of nuclear cosmochronology was in 1929, by Ernest Rutherford, who, shortly after the discovery that uranium has two naturally occurring radioactive isotopes with different half-lives, attempted to use the ratio to determine when the uranium had been produced. He suggested that both had been produced in equal abundances, assuming they had been produced in a single moment in time, and applied an argument based on incorrect assumptions about astrophysics to derive an incorrect age of about 6 billion years. He pioneered the idea that age could be calculated by the ratio of abundances of radioactive parent elements and their stable decay products.

According to a tribute written by colleagues, a large part of the modern science of nuclear cosmochronology grew out of work by John Reynolds and his students.

Model-independent techniques were developed in 1970.

== Technique ==
It is necessarily to know the initial ratios by which nucleosynthesis produce radioactive parent elements in comparison to the stable elements they decay to, before decay occurs. These are the abundances which the elements would have if the radioactive parent elements were stable, and not producing daughter nuclei. The ratio of the abundance of radioactive elements to the abundance they would have if they were stable is called the remainder. Measurement of the current abundances of elements in objects, combined with nucleosynthesis theory, determines the remainders.

== See also ==
- Astrochemistry
- Astronomical chronology
- Geochronology
- Gyrochronology
