= RX J1633.3+4718 =

Narrow-line Seyfert galaxy located in the constellation Hercules

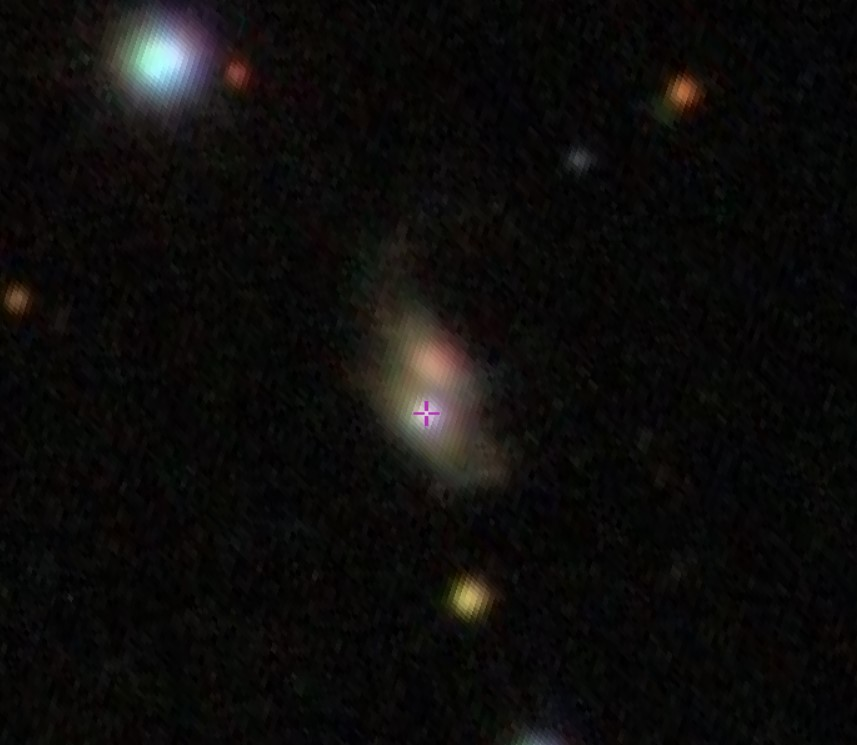
- The narrow-line Seyfert 1 galaxy RX J1633.3+4718

Observation data (J2000.0 epoch)
- Constellation: Hercules
- Right ascension: 16^{h} 33^{m} 23.580^{s}
- Declination: +47° 18′ 58.929″
- Redshift: 0.115761
- Heliocentric radial velocity: 34,704 km/s
- Distance: 1.753 Gly (537.47 Mpc)
- Apparent magnitude (V): 17.35
- Apparent magnitude (B): 17.77

Characteristics
- Type: Sy 1
- Apparent size (V): 87.63 kiloparsecs (285,800 light-years) (diameter; 2MASS K-band total isophote)

Other designations
- LEDA 140641, RX J1633.3+4719, IRAS F16319+4725, EF B1631+4725, SDSS J163323.58+471858.9, RXS J16633+4718

RX J1633.3+4718 (RX J1633+4718) known as RXS J16333+4718 according to VLBI Network observations, is a narrow-line Seyfert 1 galaxy, located in the constellation of Hercules. It has a redshift of (z) 0.116 and is located 1.75 billion light years from Earth. The first known reference to this galaxy comes from a radio source which was identified in 1995 in the IRAS catalogue as F16319+4725.

== Description ==
RX J1633.3+4718 contains a radio loud active galactic nucleus (AGN) with a measured radio loudness parameter of R_{5} = f_{v}(5 GHz)/f_{v}(4400Å) > 100. Furthermore, the AGN is hosted in a disk galaxy found interacting with a starburst galaxy. The two nuclei of both galaxies are about 8 kiloparsecs from each other.

Two unique components are found in RX J1633.3+4718, mainly a core component and a north component. Both of the components are connected with the two galaxies in the interacting system, with measured flux densities of 24.48 mJy and 0.79 mJy.

The core component is unresolved. It has an inverted radio spectrum whereas the spectral index is found steep. The core component is suggested to be significantly variable, hinting at the presence of jet activity in RX J1633.3+4718. This is further confirmed by the jet's high brightness temperature of 10^{11.3} K and parsec-scale core-jet radio morphology when seen in high resolution observations at 1.7 and 5 GHz respectively. The north component on the other hand, is fainter and located at a position angle of 352°, away from the core by 3.8 arcsec.

The accretion disk of RX J1633.3+4718 is shown to have ultrasoft excess X-ray emission. It is lower than 0.5 KeV with the temperature of the galaxy's disk estimated to be 40 electronvolts based on a disc model for soft excess. The mass of the black hole in RX J1633+4718 is estimated to be 3 million M_{☉} while a bolometric luminosity of L_{bol} ≈ 1.51 × 10^{44} erg s^{−1} was derived from an unabsorbed flux measurement in a 0.001-100 KeV energy band.
