= OQ 530 =

BL Lacertae object in the constellation Boötes

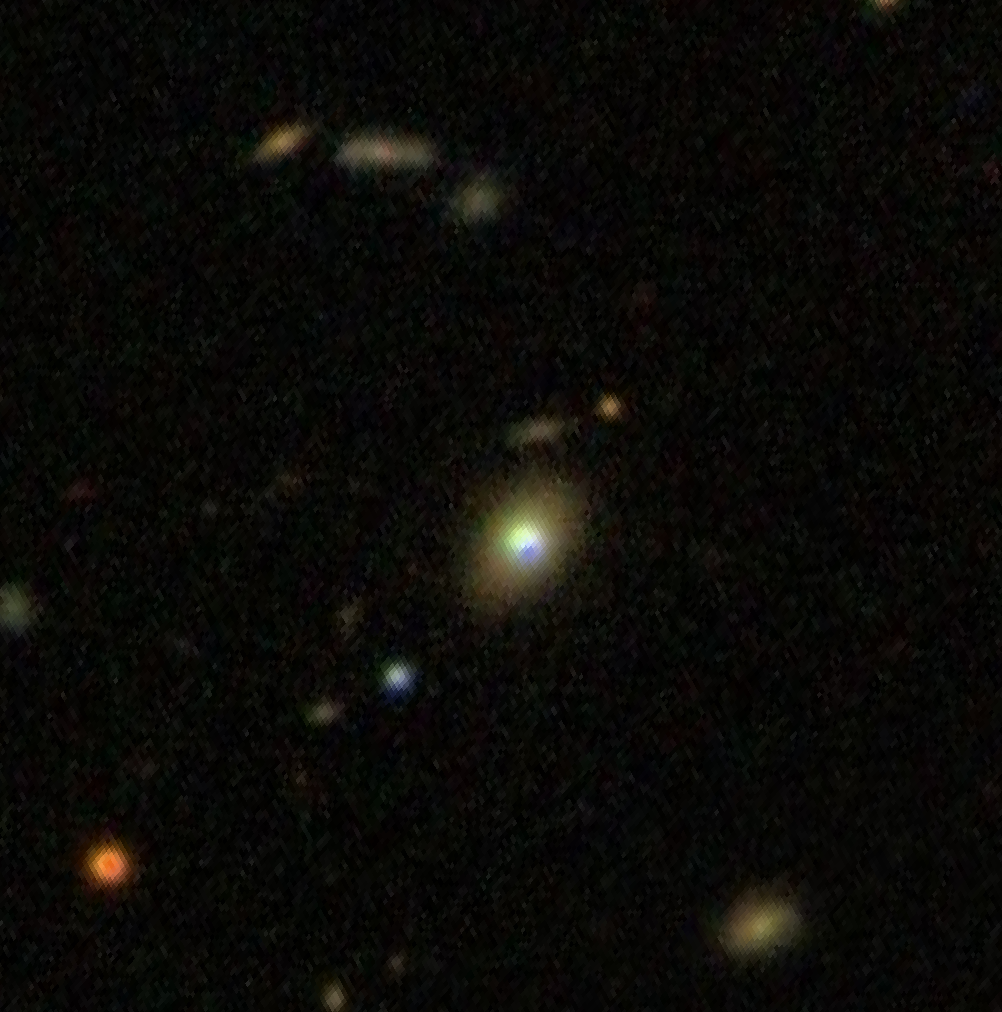
- The BL Lacertae object OQ 530

Observation data (J2000.0 epoch)
- Constellation: Boötes
- Right ascension: 14^{h} 19^{m} 46.59^{s}
- Declination: +54° 23′ 14.78″
- Redshift: 0.152500
- Heliocentric radial velocity: 45,718 km/s
- Distance: 1.989 Gly
- Apparent magnitude (V): 15.65
- Apparent magnitude (B): 16.17

Characteristics
- Type: Opt. Var. BLLAC
- Size: ~177,600 ly (54.44 kpc) (estimated)

Other designations
- 2MASS J14194660+5423147, 1418+546, CSO 0633, IVS B1418+546, NVSS J141946+542315, PG 1418+546

OQ 530 is a BL Lacertae object located in the constellation of Boötes. The redshift of the object is (z) 0.152 and it was first discovered in 1978 by astronomers who classified the object to be violently variable based on it displaying optical variations.

== Description ==
OQ 530 is extremely variable, with several outbursts being displayed between 1915 and 1942. Its most prominent outburst was in 1938, when the object underwent a series of violent changes in brightness levels, reaching a maximum peak of 12.5 magnitude. A brightening phase was detected on the first day of April 1990, followed by a faint state three days later. It is also said that OQ 530 can be classified as a blazar due to its variability in the electromagnetic spectrum. A study published in 1997 by Nesci et al. investigated the long-term optical luminosity evolution of OQ 530, examining its secular brightness trend over several decades.

The host galaxy of OQ 530 is a luminous disk galaxy based on high resolution imaging, with its surface brightness profile resembling something like a lenticular galaxy.

The radio structure of the galaxy is compact. When observed with Very Long Baseline Interferometry (VLBI), it is found to have a radio jet extending outwards by 40 milliarcseconds from the radio core and orientated at a position angle of 130° by southeast direction. The jet structure is mainly complex with an outer component that broadens upon reaching a distance of four milliarcseconds. There are three other components and a compact radio core which displays signs of polarization. A hotspot feature with a flat index spectrum is also present. Another component is found west from the core with an elongated appearance. Faint radio emission is also surrounding it, indicating a halo feature is present. A 456-day optical period is suggested for the galaxy, which might be accounted for by either a binary black hole or a helical jet.
