= GJ 2030 =

Star in the constellation Eridanus

Observation data Epoch J2000 Equinox ICRS
- Constellation: Eridanus
- Right ascension: 03^{h} 23^{m} 17.70116^{s}
- Declination: −07° 47′ 38.7554″
- Apparent magnitude (V): 6.206±0.003

Characteristics
- Evolutionary stage: subgiant
- Spectral type: G5/6V

Astrometry
Radial velocity (R_{v})	+41.67±0.16 km/s
Proper motion (μ)	RA: +1.295 mas/yr Dec.: −219.292 mas/yr
Parallax (π)	26.7913±0.0912 mas
Distance	121.7 ± 0.4 ly (37.3 ± 0.1 pc)
Absolute magnitude (M_{V})	+3.35

Details
Mass	1.022±0.024 M_{☉}
Radius	2.429±0.061 R_{☉}
Luminosity	4.064±0.043 L_{☉}
Surface gravity (log g)	3.73±0.12 cgs
Temperature	5,259±66 K
Metallicity [Fe/H]	−0.45±0.02 dex
Age	6.39 Gyr

Other designations
- BD−08°643, GJ 2030, HD 21019, HIP 15776, HR 1024, TYC 5295-1155-1

Database references
SIMBAD	data
Exoplanet Archive	data

GJ 2030 is a star in the constellation Eridanus. At an apparent magnitude of +6.206, it is close to the average threshold for naked eye visibility, and can only be viewed from sufficiently dark skies, far from light pollution. Parallax measurements by the Gaia spacecraft measured a distance of 121.7 light-years, give or take 0.4 light-years.

The spectrum of this star matches a spectral class of G5/6V, with the luminosity class V suggesting it is a main sequence star, but its physical properties suggest it is actually a subgiant. It has 1.02 times the Sun's mass and 2.43 times the Sun's radius. It radiates 4.06 times the Sun's luminosity from its photosphere at an effective temperature of 5,259 K. At this temperature, the star shines with a yellowish color typical of G-type stars.

GJ 2030 is likely a member of the thick disk population, with a substantially lower metallicity than the Sun. Its age is estimated at 6.39 billion years, older than the Solar System.

== Planetary system ==
Two extrasolar planets were discovered around the star in 2022, detected via Doppler spectroscopy (radial velocity method) and astrometry.

The GJ 2030 planetary system
Companion (in order from star)	Mass	Semimajor axis (AU)	Orbital period (years)	Eccentricity	Inclination (°)	Radius
b	≥0.015±0.002 M_{J}	0.034+0.001 −0.002	0.0065196±0.0000004	0.239+0.075 −0.058	—	—
c	12.803+2.335 −2.136 M_{J}	16.761+1.294 −1.337	69.91+6.36 −7.00	0.041+0.003 −0.008	16.999+2.935 −2.535	—
