= NGC 3621 =

Spiral galaxy in the constellation Hydra

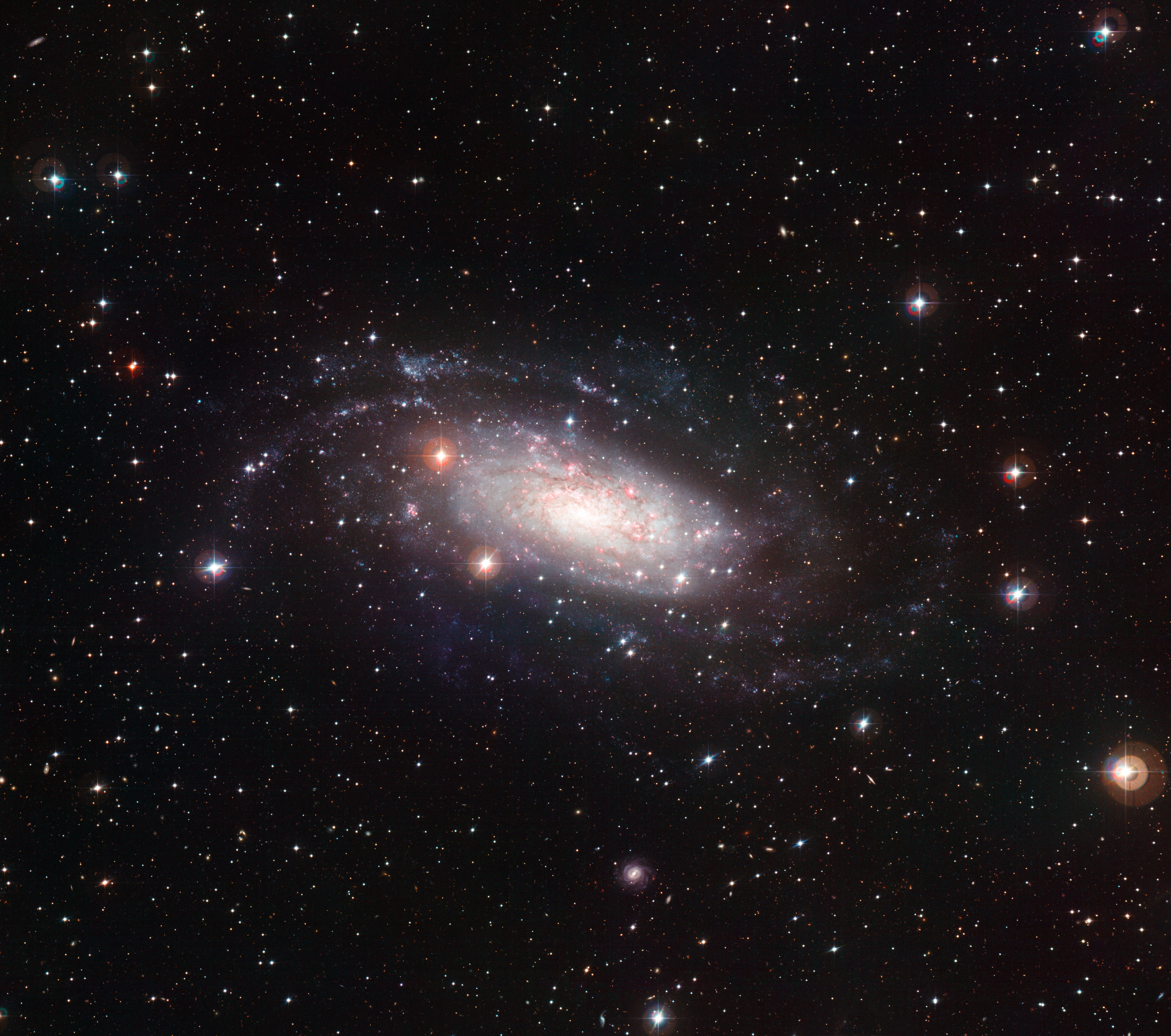
- NGC 3621 taken by the Wide Field Imager (WFI) at ESO's La Silla Observatory

Observation data (J2000 epoch)
- Constellation: Hydra
- Right ascension: 11^{h} 18^{m} 16.5109^{s}
- Declination: –32° 48′ 49.732″
- Redshift: 0.002403
- Heliocentric radial velocity: 720 km/s
- Distance: 21.7 Mly (6.64 Mpc)
- Apparent magnitude (V): 9.4

Characteristics
- Type: SA(s)d
- Mass: 2 × 10^{10} M_{☉}
- Size: ~216,900 ly (66.49 kpc) (estimated)
- Apparent size (V): 12.3′ × 6.8′

Other designations
- ESO 377- G 037, IRAS 11158-3232, NGC 3621, UGCA 232, MCG -05-27-008, PGC 34554

NGC 3621, also known as the Frame Galaxy or Southern Cross Galaxy, is a disk spiral galaxy about 21.7 million light-years (6.64 Mpc) away in the equatorial constellation of Hydra. It was discovered by German-British astronomer William Herschel on 17 February 1790.

NGC 3621 is comparatively bright and can be well seen in moderate-sized telescopes. The galaxy is around 216,900 ly (66,500 pc) across and is inclined at an angle of 66° from being viewed face on. It shines with a luminosity equal to 13 billion times that of the Sun. The morphological classification is SA(s)d, which indicates this is an ordinary spiral with loosely wound arms. There is no evidence for a bulge. Although it appears to be isolated, NGC 3621 belongs to the Leo spur.

This galaxy has an active nucleus that matches a Seyfert 2 optical spectrum, suggesting that a low mass supermassive black hole is present at the core. Based upon the motion of stars in the nucleus, this object may have a mass of up to three million times the mass of the Sun.

== Supernova ==
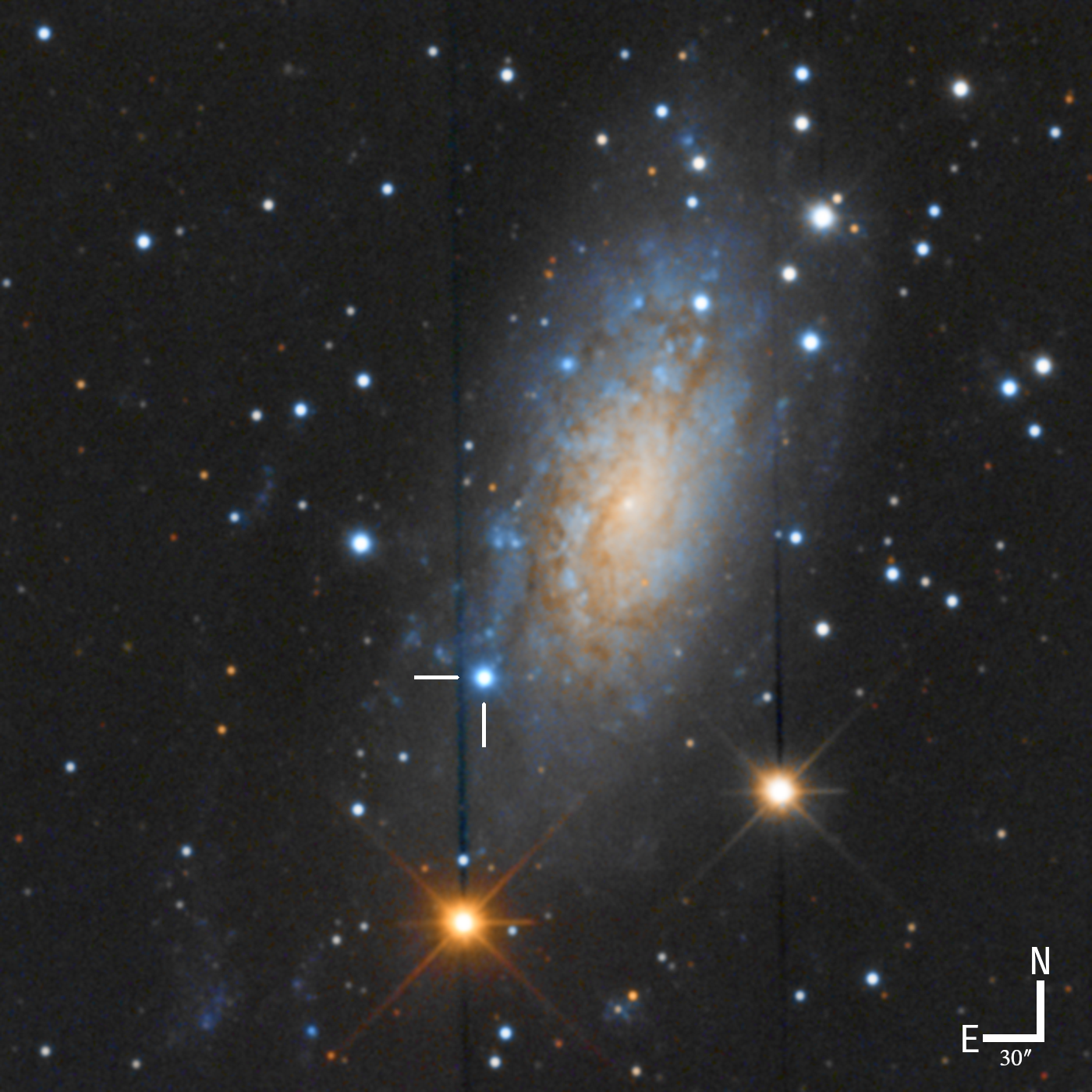
NGC 3621, with SN 2024ggi marked

One supernova has been observed in NGC 3621: SN 2024ggi (Type II, mag. 18.915) was discovered by ATLAS on 11 April 2024. By 16 April it had brightened to magnitude 12, and got as bright as magnitude 11.9, making it the brightest supernova of 2024. It was the closest supernova to Earth since SN 2023ixf, which had been discovered on 19 May 2023. A search of archival Hubble Space Telescope and Spitzer Space Telescope images showed the suspected progenitor star, identified as a red supergiant. The mass of the progenitor has been estimated at 12-15 M_{☉}.

== Gallery ==
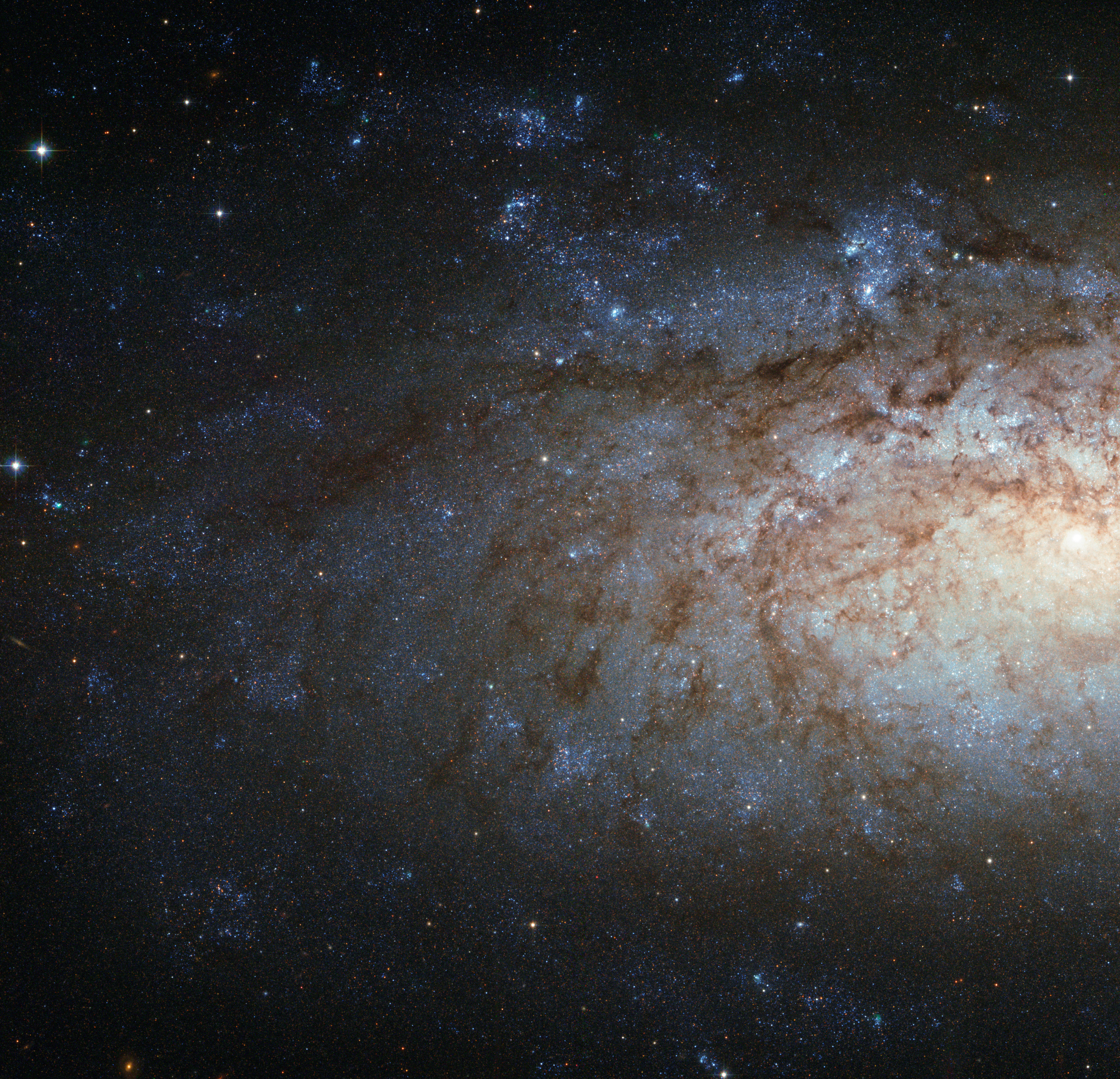
Part of NGC 3621 imaged by HST.

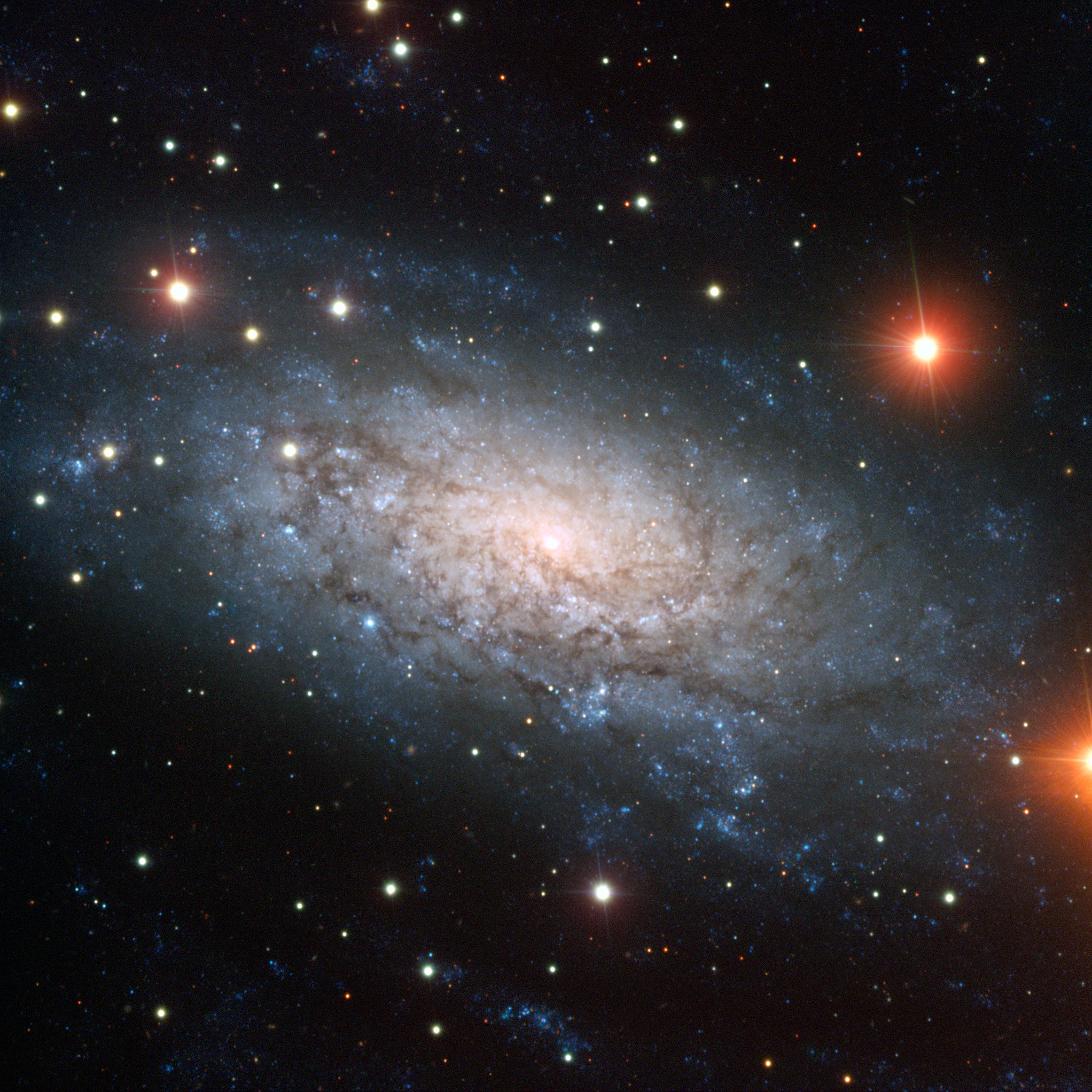
Very Large Telescope image of NGC 3621.

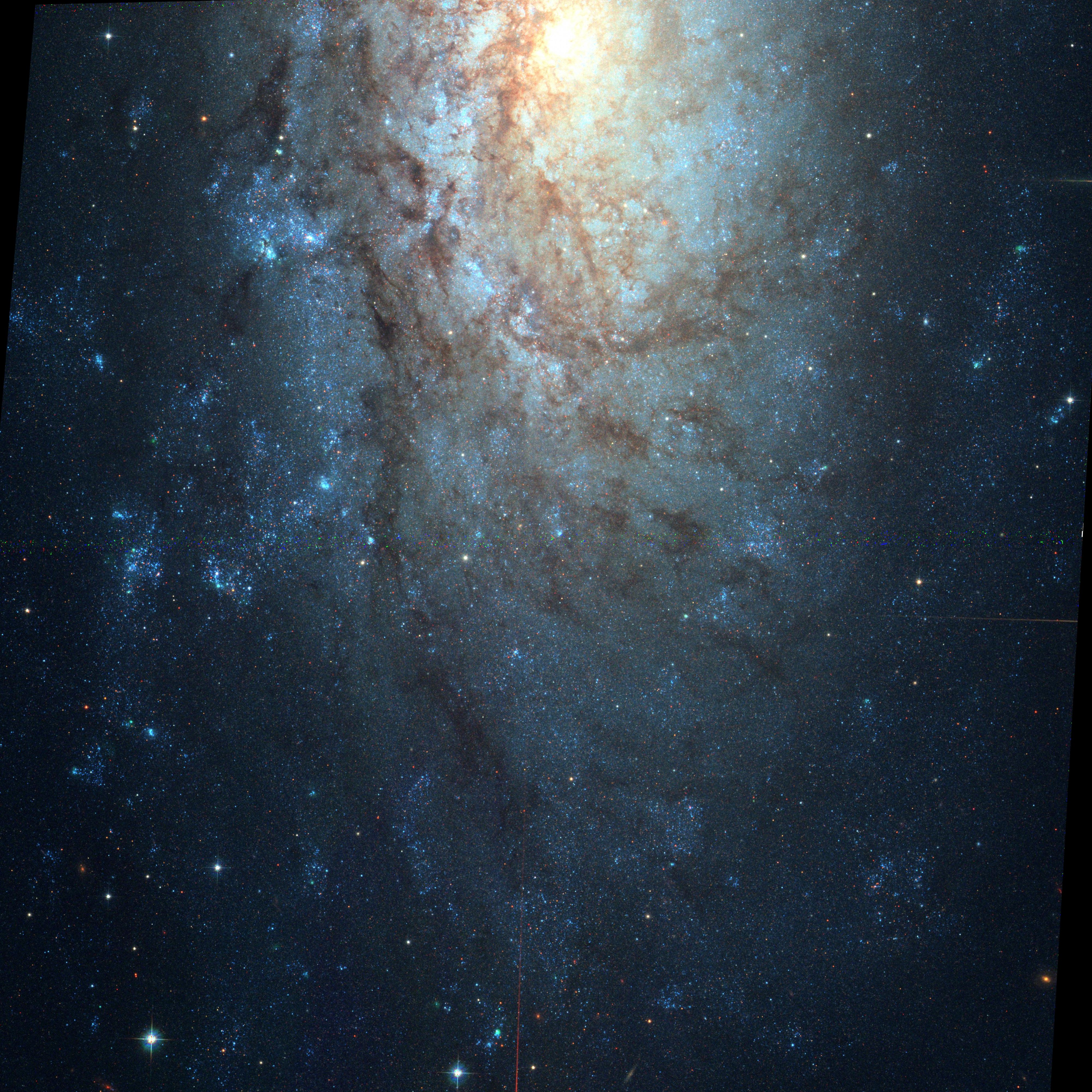
NGC 3621 by Hubble Space Telescope

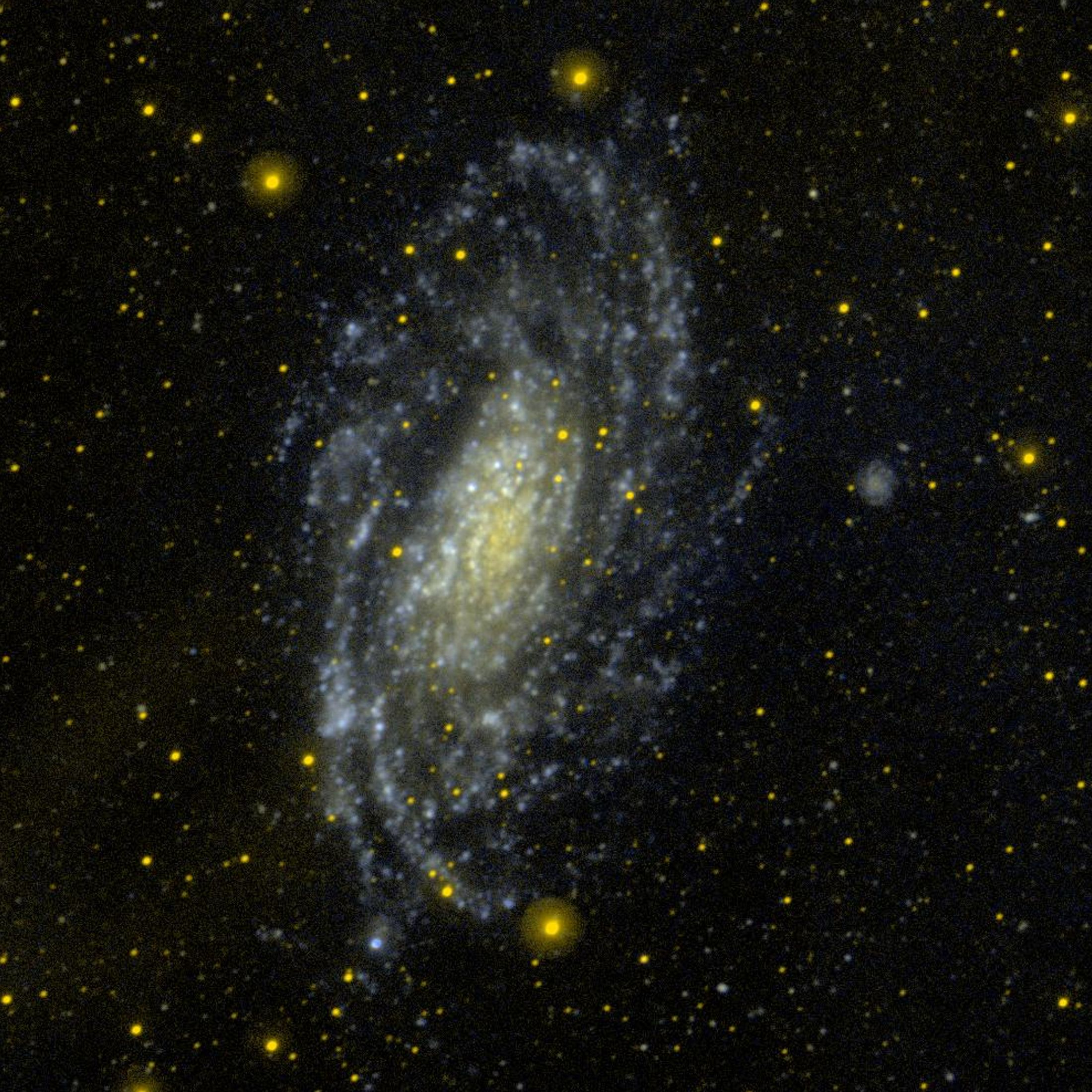
NGC 3621 by GALEX

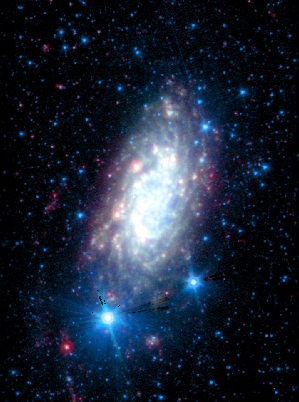
Spitzer Space Telescope image of NGC 3621.

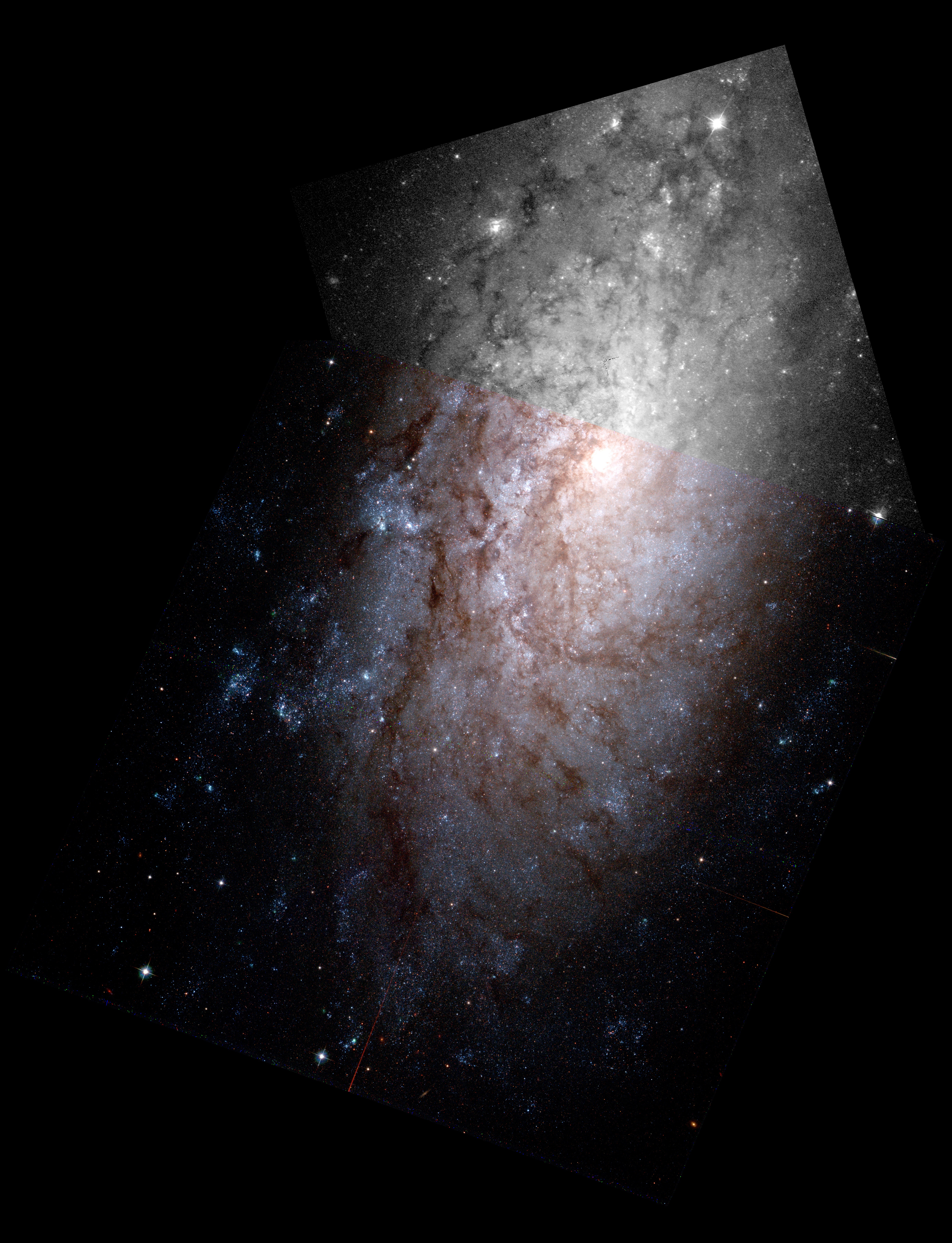
NGC 3621 (HST)

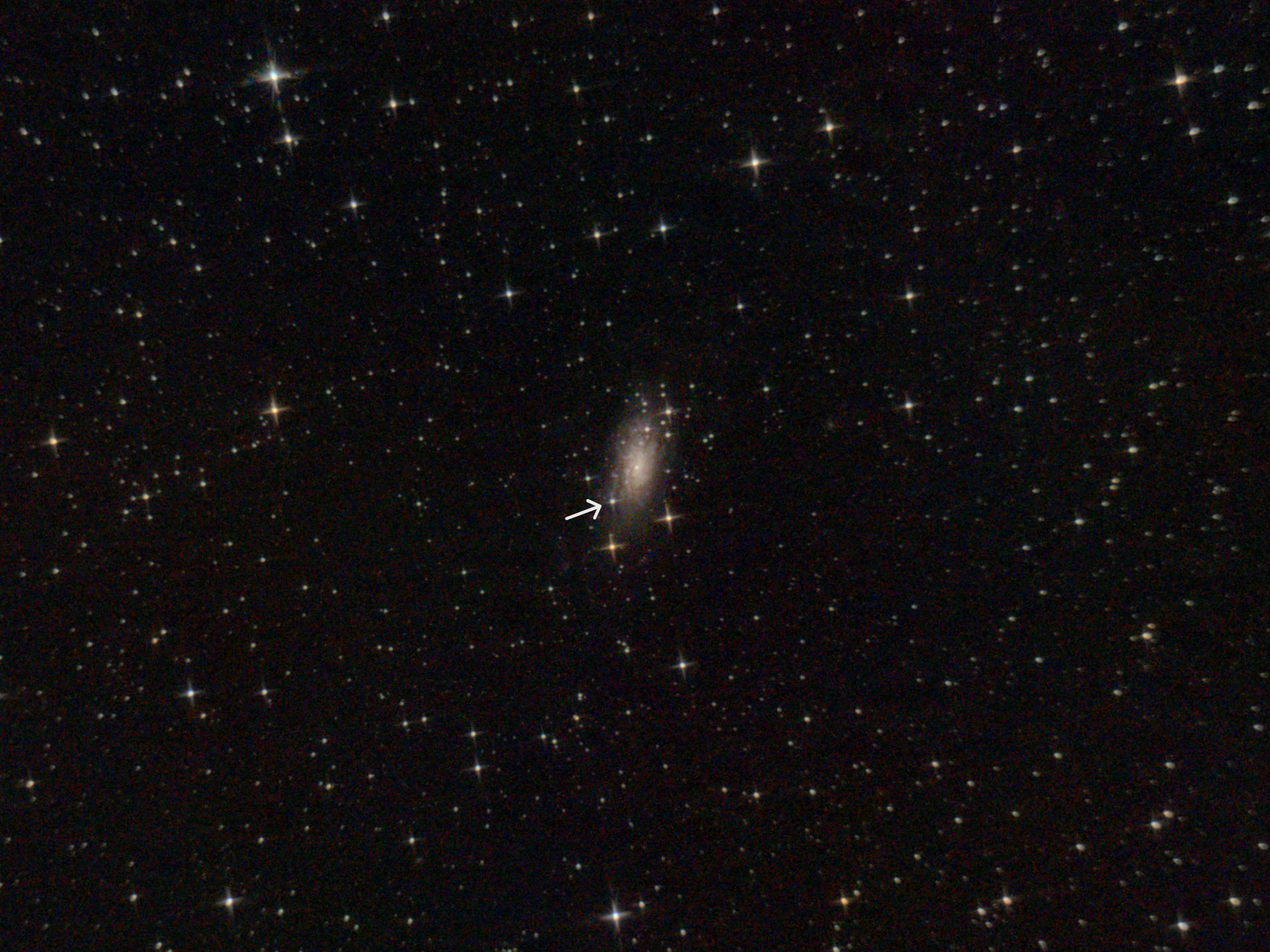
NGC 3621 with SN 2024ggi

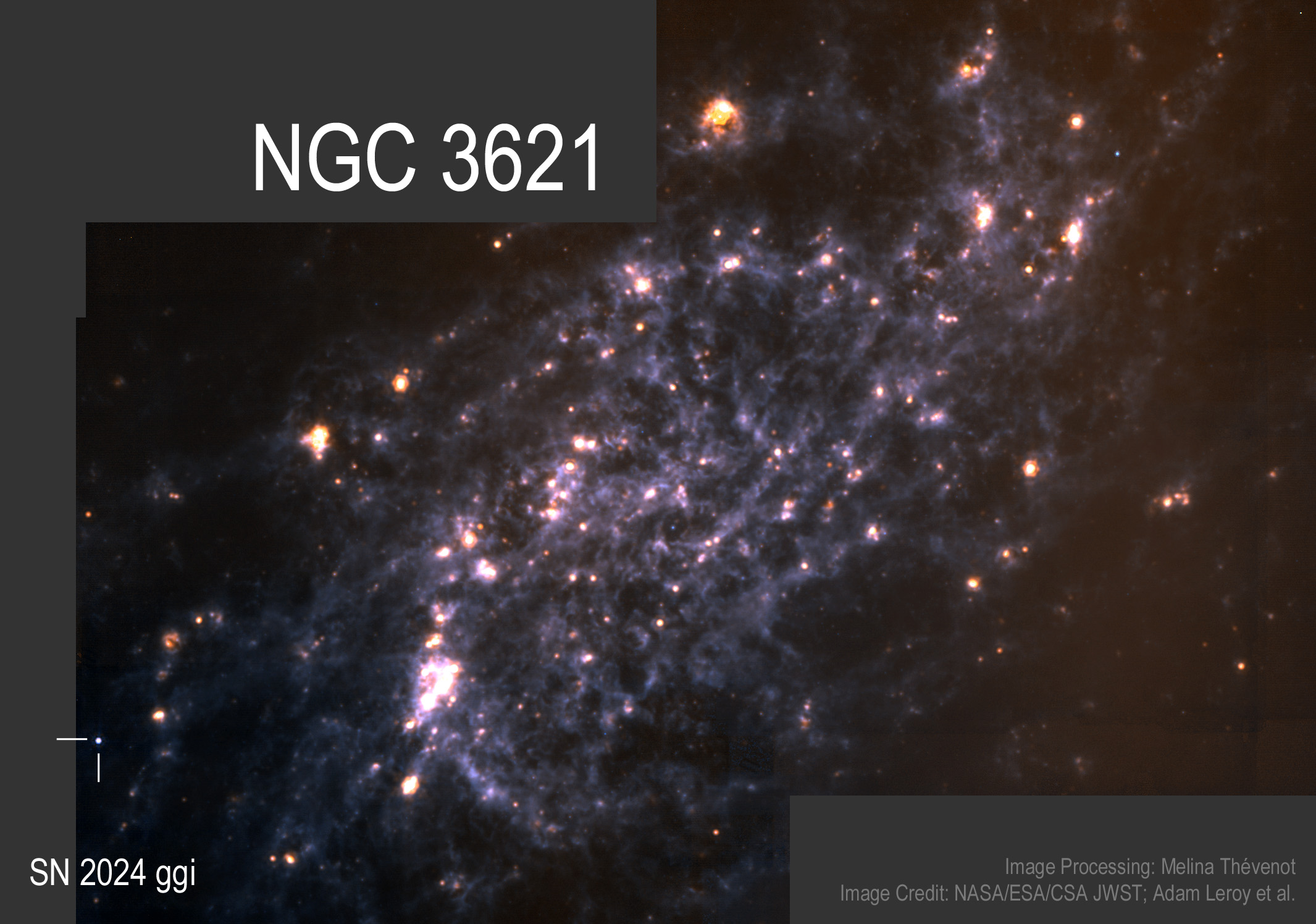
NGC 3621 and SN 2024ggi with JWST MIRI

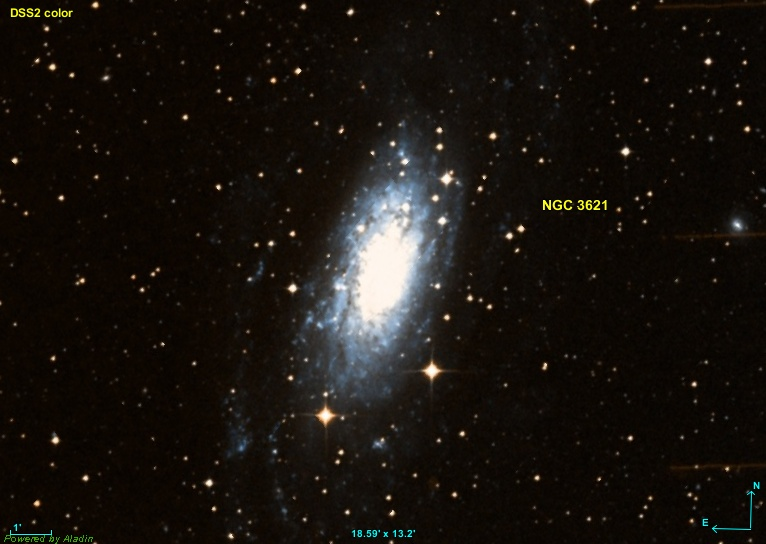
DSS image of NGC 3621

== See also ==
- List of NGC objects (3001–4000)
