= Arthur Storch =

American actor (1925–2013)

- Arthur Storch in the 1970s
- Born: June 29, 1925; Brooklyn, New York City, U.S.
- Died: March 5, 2013 (aged 87); Manhattan, New York City, U.S.
- Occupations: Actor; theatre director; artistic director
- Years active: 1950–2013
- Known for: Founding Syracuse Stage; Broadway directing Film roles including The Exorcist
- Children: Max, Alexander, Bess

Arthur Storch (June 29, 1925 – March 5, 2013) was an American actor, theatre director, and educator. A life member of The Actors Studio, he founded Syracuse Stage in 1974 and served as its artistic director for 18 years, establishing it as a major regional theater. Storch directed over 50 productions there while simultaneously serving as Chair of the Syracuse University Drama Department and teaching where he developed the influential "Syracuse Model" of actor training. His Broadway career spanned four decades as both an actor (A Hatful of Rain, The Night of the Iguana) and director (Tribute, Norman, Is That You?). He also appeared in films including The Exorcist (1973) and mentored actors like Frank Langella.

== Early life ==
Arthur Storch was born on June 29, 1925, in Brooklyn, New York, to a Jewish family. He attended Thomas Jefferson High School. He enlisted in the United States Army after the attack on Pearl Harbor and served in World War II. He was involved in the Invasion of Normandy and advanced deep into Germany by the war's end.

After his service, he studied drama at The New School under Erwin Piscator in the 1940s. In 1952, Storch joined The Actors Studio, where he trained alongside Marlon Brando and Julie Harris in method acting.

== Career ==
=== Early acting career ===
After studying at The Actors Studio, Storch began his career as an actor in the 1950s. He appeared in several Broadway productions including Michael V. Gazzo's A Hatful of Rain (1955) and the original production of Tennessee Williams' The Night of the Iguana (1961).

His Broadway acting credits also included The Egghead (1957) and The Disenchanted (1958), establishing him as a character actor in dramatic roles.

=== Directing and Syracuse Stage ===
Storch founded Syracuse Stage in 1974 as a professional theater integrated with Syracuse University's drama program - an innovative model later adopted by Yale and Juilliard. As artistic director until 1992, he:

- Directed 50+ productions including the world premiere of Tribute (1978), which transferred to Broadway
- Developed new works like Frank Langella's Cyrano (1986)
- Taught acting using his signature text-analysis approach

Under his leadership, Syracuse Stage became a regional powerhouse, premiering works as Patrick Meyer's, K2 (1984), and Frank Langella's Cyrano (1986).

=== Film and later work ===
Storch appeared as the psychiatrist in William Friedkin's horror classic The Exorcist (1973). He continued acting sporadically in film and television through the 2000s, while also teaching at The New School in New York.

=== Teaching ===
Storch served as a professor at Syracuse University's College of Visual and Performing Arts from 1974 to 1992, where he developed his signature approach combining Stanislavskian principles with rigorous text analysis. He pioneered the "Syracuse Model," integrating professional regional theatre (through Syracuse Stage) with academic training - an approach later emulated by programs like Yale and Juilliard.

His notable contemporary Frank Langella and student Taye Diggs frequently cited his transformative mentorship:

"Arthur demanded we mine the text for clues—every punctuation mark mattered. He'd say, 'If you're pretending, the audience will know.'"

— Frank Langella, Syracuse University Magazine (2015)

Storch's pedagogical approach directly influenced his professional work. His 1978 production of Tribute, developed through Syracuse Stage's academic-theatre pipeline, transferred to Broadway with its "razor-sharp comic timing" intact. This synergy between classroom and stage became a hallmark of his tenure.

== Personal life ==
Storch was married five times; Brook Hanna, Vergel Cook (actor), Virginia Kiser (actor), Cynthia Martin, & Peggy McEvoy and had three children, Max, Alexander & Bess. His son Max followed him into theatre as a production manager.

== Death and legacy ==
Storch died from natural causes on March 5, 2013, in Manhattan. In 2014, Syracuse Stage:

- Established the **Arthur Storch Award for Outstanding New Play**
- Named its mainstage in his honor
- Premiered a WCNY-TV documentary about his career

=== Tributes ===
Following his death, Frank Langella recalled Storch as "a fierce advocate for actors and new plays," while Syracuse Stage artistic director Robert Hupp stated, "Arthur built this theater with sheer will and artistic integrity." The Drama League honored him posthumously for his contributions to regional theatre.

== Filmography ==
=== Film ===
Year	Title	Role	Notes
1957	The Strange One	Cadet Simmons	Film debut; controversial military academy drama
1958	The Mugger	Jack "Skippy" Randolph	Film noir starring Kent Smith
1960	Girl of the Night	Jason Franklin Jr.	Groundbreaking drama about prostitution rehabilitation
1963	Lonnie	Dr. Rosen	Psychological short film
1973	The Exorcist	Psychiatrist	Uncredited role in hospital scene
2002	Bridget	Hawk	Final film role; independent drama

=== Television ===
Year	Title	Role	Notes
1958	Naked City	Dr. Feld	Episode: "The Bumper" (Season 1)
1961	The Defenders	Dr. Lewin	Episode: "The Prowler"
1963	East Side/West Side	Harold Weiss	Episode: "No Hiding Place"
1964	The Doctors and the Nurses	Dr. Kaplan	Episode: "The Prisoner"
1964	The Nurses	Dr. Belman	Episode: "The Gift"
1975	Great Performances	Director	Staged The Comedy of Errors adaptation

=== Stage ===
==== As actor ====
- A Hatful of Rain (1955) - Broadway (Replacement)
- The Egghead (1957) - Broadway (Howard Wagner)
- The Disenchanted (1958) - Broadway (Understudy)
- The Night of the Iguana (1961) - Broadway (Original cast)

==== As director ====
Year	Production	Venue	Notes
1963	The Typist and the Tiger	Off- Broadway	
1965	The Impossible Years	Brooks Atkinson Theatre	Broadway debut as director
1966	The Office	Cherry Lane Theatre	Off-Broadway debut
1970	Norman, Is That You?	Lyceum Theatre	Longest-running Broadway show (774 performances)
1972	The Secret Affairs of Mildred Wild	Eugene O'Neill Theatre	Starring Maureen Stapleton
1964	The Owl and the Pussycat	Anta Theatre	
1976	The Comedy of Errors	Syracuse Stage	Musical adaptation
1978	Tribute	Brooks Atkinson Theatre	Transferred from Syracuse Stage
1986	Cyrano	Syracuse Stage	World premiere with Frank Langella
