= Galactic corona =

Hot, ionised, gaseous component of a galactic halo

The terms galactic corona and gaseous corona have been used in the first decade of the 21st century to describe a hot, ionised, gaseous component in the galactic halo of the Milky Way. A similar body of very hot and tenuous gas in the halo of any spiral galaxy may also be described by these terms.

== Current hypothetical scenario ==
The hypothetical source of the galactic halo of coronal gas may be the cumulative output of many “galactic fountains” in the galactic disc ejecting hot gas.

The hypothesis is that a single supernova and then its supernova remnant both produce hot ionized gas that supplies an individual “galactic fountain”. The expelled material forms a giant bubble of high-pressure, low density, hot gas in the denser, cooler gas and dust of the galactic disc. At least some of those bubbles extend high or low enough, vertically, to pierce through the denser disk, and form “chimneys” which exhaust the hot gas into the halo, analogous to a terrestrial geyser spewing out water and steam that is much hotter and much less dense than the surrounding earth, heated by a source hidden deep below.

As the expelled gas in the galactic corona cools, it falls back into the galactic disc, guided by the disc's own gravitational attraction, enriching the gas and dust in the disc with the heavy elements (loosely termed “metals” by astronomers) which were produced in supernova precursors, and during supernova explosions.

== Current research ==
Galactic coronas have been and are currently being studied extensively, in the hope of gaining a further understanding of galaxy formation. However, considering how galaxies differ in shape and size, no particular theory has been able to adequately explain how all galactic coronas are formed and maintained.

== See also ==
- Galaxy formation and evolution – Subfield of cosmology
- Galactic coordinate system – Celestial coordinate system in spherical coordinates, with the Sun as its center
- Galactic bulge – Tightly packed group of stars within a larger formation
- Disc galaxy – Type of galactic form
  - Spiral arm – Spiral-shaped regions of enhanced brightness within the galactic disc in spiral galaxies
- Galactic halo – Spherical component of a galaxy
- Galactic spheroid – Class of galaxy that has spiral structures extending from their cores
