= Stellar halo =

Star-containing portion of a galactic halo

A stellar halo is the component of a galaxy's galactic halo that contains stars. The stellar halo extends far outside a galaxy's brightest regions and typically contains its oldest and most metal-poor stars.

== Observation history ==
Early studies, investigating the shape of the stellar halo of the Milky Way, found some evidence that it may vary with increasing distance from the galaxy. These studies found halos with spherically shaped outer regions and flatter inner regions. Large surveys in the 21st century such as the Sloan Digital Sky Survey have allowed the shape and distribution of the stellar halo to be investigated in much more detail; this data has been used to postulate a triaxial or oblate halo. More recent studies have found the halo to be flattened with a broken power law radius dependence; evidence for triaxiality is unclear.

As a result of their faint brightness, observations of stellar halos in distant galaxies have required very long exposure times, the stacking of data from numerous galaxies to obtain averaged properties, or observing only the resolved stellar populations. Individual resolved stars in stellar halos can only be measured in the Milky Way and Andromeda. The furthest stellar halos detected are at a redshift distance of 1.

== Structure and properties ==
In the Lambda-CDM model of the universe, galaxies grow by mergers. Such mergers are the cause of substructure observed in the stellar halo of galaxies; streams of stars from disrupted satellite galaxies are detectable through their coherence in space or velocity; a number of these streams are observable around the Milky Way. As a result of the buildup from an assortment of satellite galaxies, variations in properties such as metallicity are present across stellar populations in halos.

Astrophysical simulations of galaxies have predicted that stellar halos should have two components: an inner region dominated by stars which formed within the galaxy, and an outer region primarily composed of stars accreted through merger events. Predictions for these components include different structure and rotation directions. Observational evidence for this dual halo in the Milky Way has been claimed but contested.

== Milky Way ==
Studies of the Milky Way galaxy have found that approximately 0.1–1% of its total stellar mass is contained within the stellar halo, and that it extends to over 100 kiloparsecs from the galactic centre.

== See also ==
- Dark matter halo
- Galactic corona
