= SN 2024ggi =

Supernova in the constellation Hydra

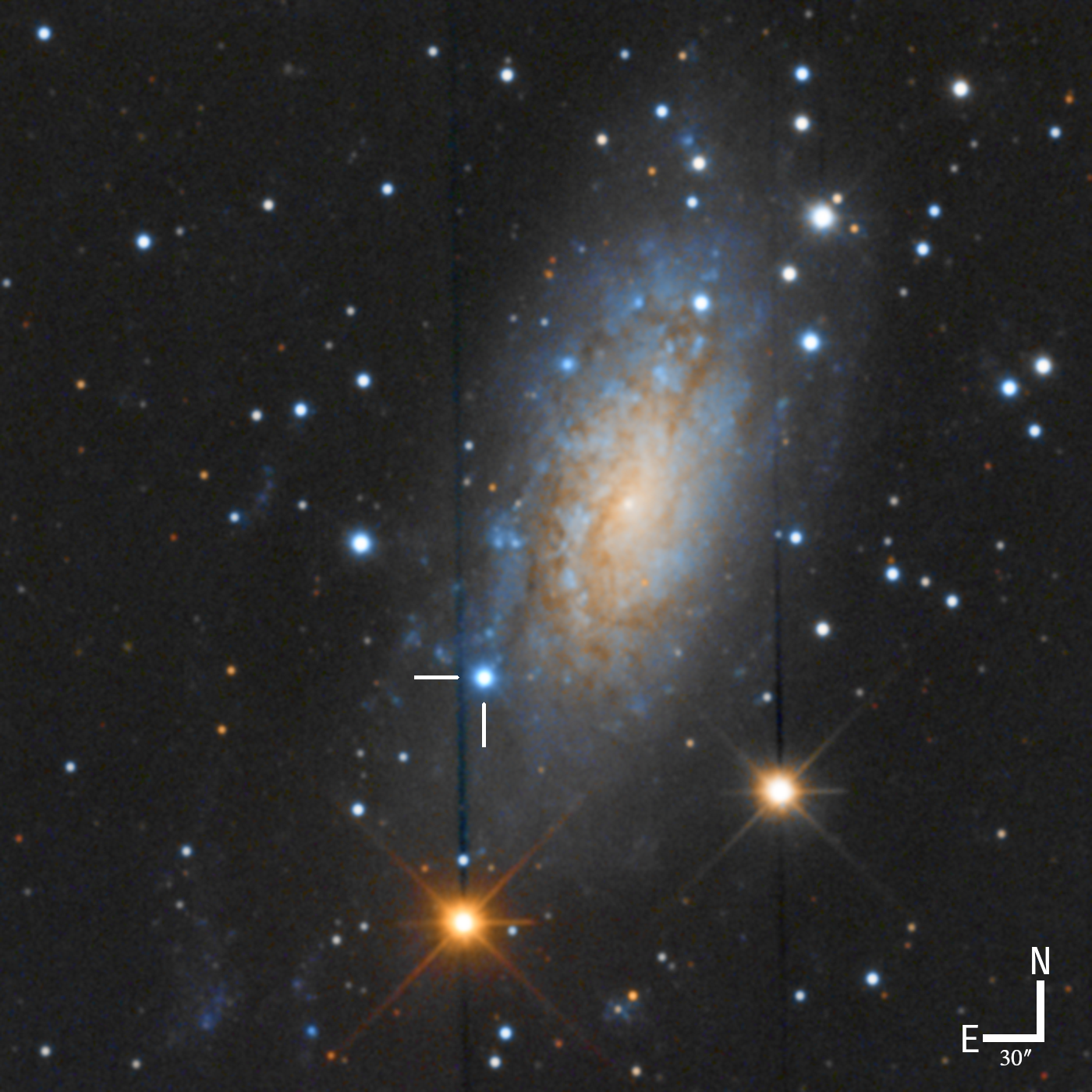
- Image of the host galaxy NGC 3621 with SN 2024ggi (bright blue dot) being marked
- Event type: Supernova
- Type II
- Date: 11 April 2024
- Instrument: ATLAS
- Constellation: Hydra
- Right ascension: 11^{h} 18^{m} 22.087^{s}
- Declination: −32° 50′ 15.27″
- Epoch: J2000
- Distance: 6.6 Mpc
- Host: NGC 3621
- Progenitor type: Zero-age main sequence (ZAMS)
- Notable features: Symmetrical ejecta
- Total energy output: 2×10^{44} J
- Other designations: ATLAS24fsk, GOTO24aig, BGEM J111822.10-325015.1, PS24brj, MASTER OT J111822.09-325015.0
- Related media on Commons

SN 2024ggi was a Type II supernova event that occurred in the spiral galaxy NGC 3621 around 6.6 Mpc from Earth in the constellation Hydra. It was discovered using ATLAS (Asteroid Terrestrial-impact Last Alert System) on 11 April 2024 at 03:21 UTC. It is one of the closest supernovae discovered to date. The explosion produced 2×10^{44} J of energy. The star that produced this explosion had around 15 solar masses and a radius of around 500 solar radii.

Due to many telescopes observing SN 2024ggi in just hours to days after the explosion, it was able to be well-characterized and studied.

== Characteristics ==
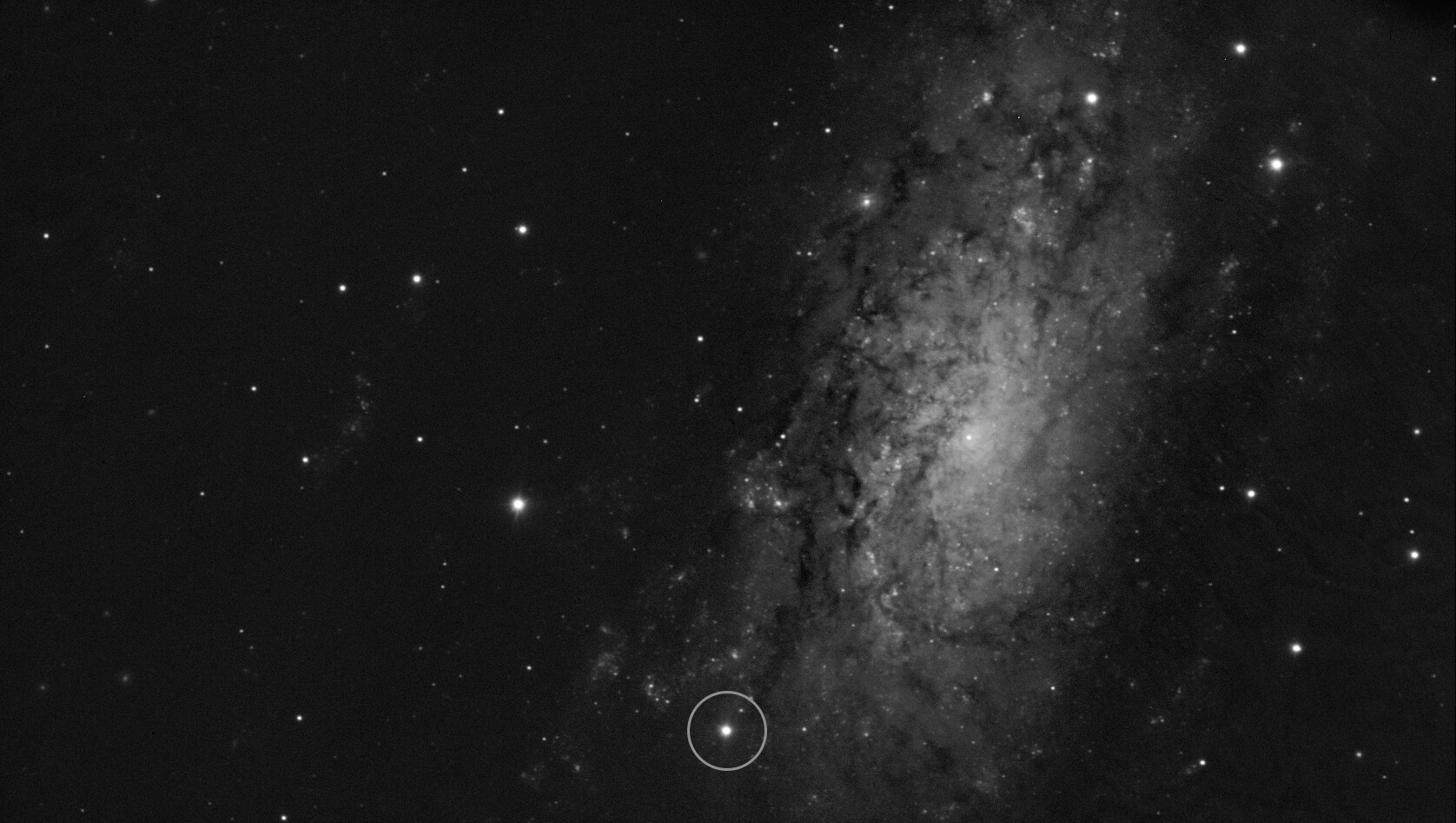
NGC 3621 with SN 2024ggi, imaged by the FORS2 instrument on ESO's Very Large Telescope

The Las Campanas and Gemini South Observatories helped determine much of the properties and characteristics of SN 2024ggi through optical photometry and spectroscopy during its nebular phase. This was to determine features of the supernova such as the progenitor star's mass, possible asymmetries in the supernova ejecta, and possible interactions with its circumstellar disks. These studies showed that the progenitor star was a zero-age main sequence (ZAMS) star that had a mass of 12–15 M_{☉} and a radius of 517 R_{☉}. The star also possibly had a mass loss rate of 4×10^{−3} M_{☉}/year (assuming 10 km/s stellar winds). The line profiles of SN 2024ggi exhibit only minor changes, suggesting that the ejecta was mostly symmetrical. These line profiles also showed that a clump of oxygen-rich material existed that was moving towards the observer. The explosion synthesized around 0.05–0.06 M_{☉} of nickel-56.

There seems to have been interaction between the supernova ejecta and the surrounding dense circumstellar material. The ejecta had engulfed the circumstellar material, causing the ejecta to emerge with a hydrogen-rich envelope.

== Discovery ==
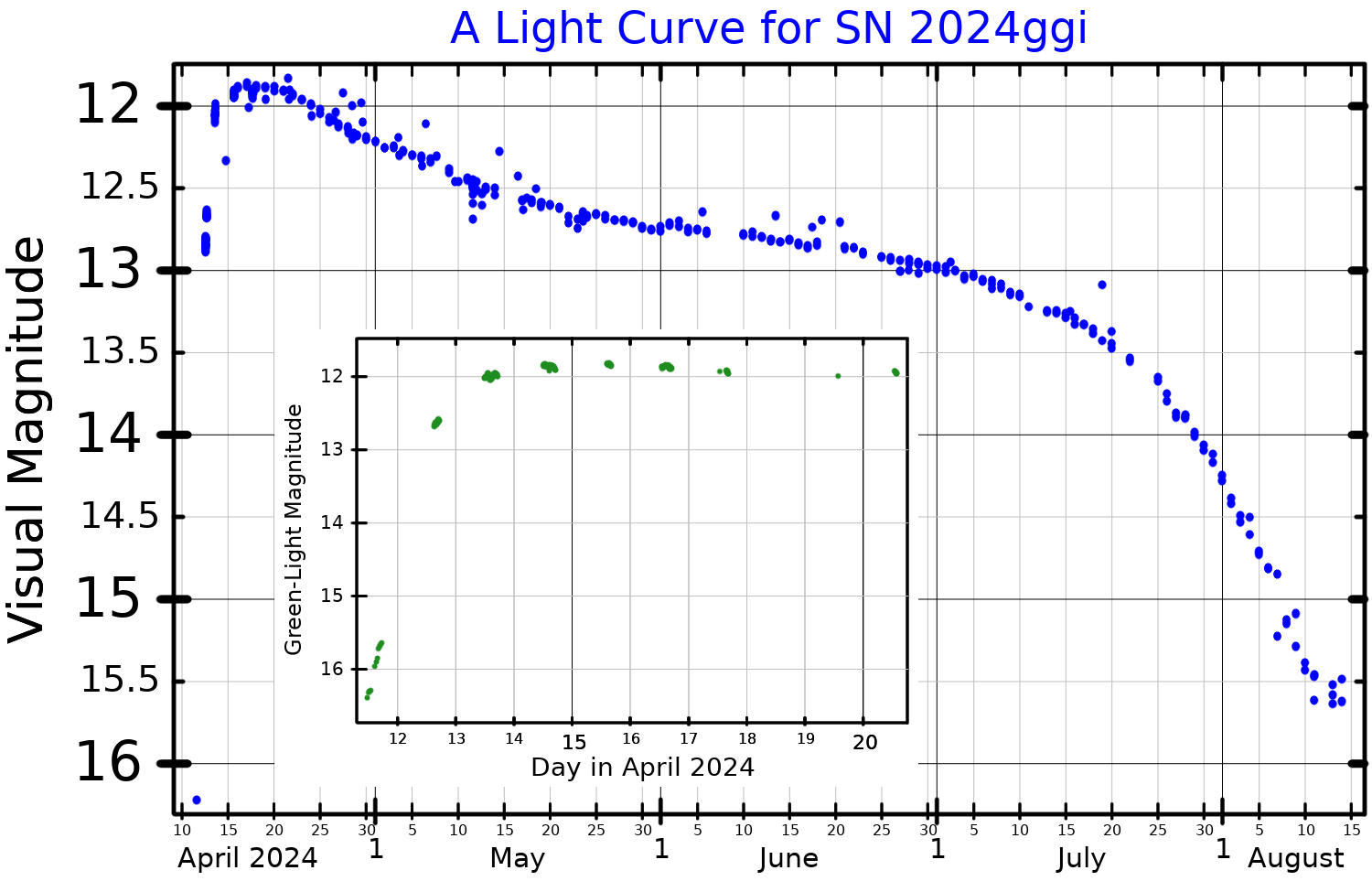
A light curve for SN 2024ggi. The main plot shows the AAVSO data, and the inset plot, plotted from data published by Chen et al., shows the first few days after the event.

SN 2024ggi was discovered on 11 April 2024. Roughly 5.8 hours after the explosion, the Kilonova finder (Kinder) performed an early-phase, high-cadence, and multiband photometric follow-up observation. These observations showed that between 13.8 and 18.8 hours after the explosion, SN 2024ggi became bluer, indicating that there was a wind shock breakout (SBO) scenario happening. At around 17 hours, it showed flash features of high-ionization species such as Balmer lines, He i, C iii, and N iii.
