= Alpha process =

Nuclear fusion reaction

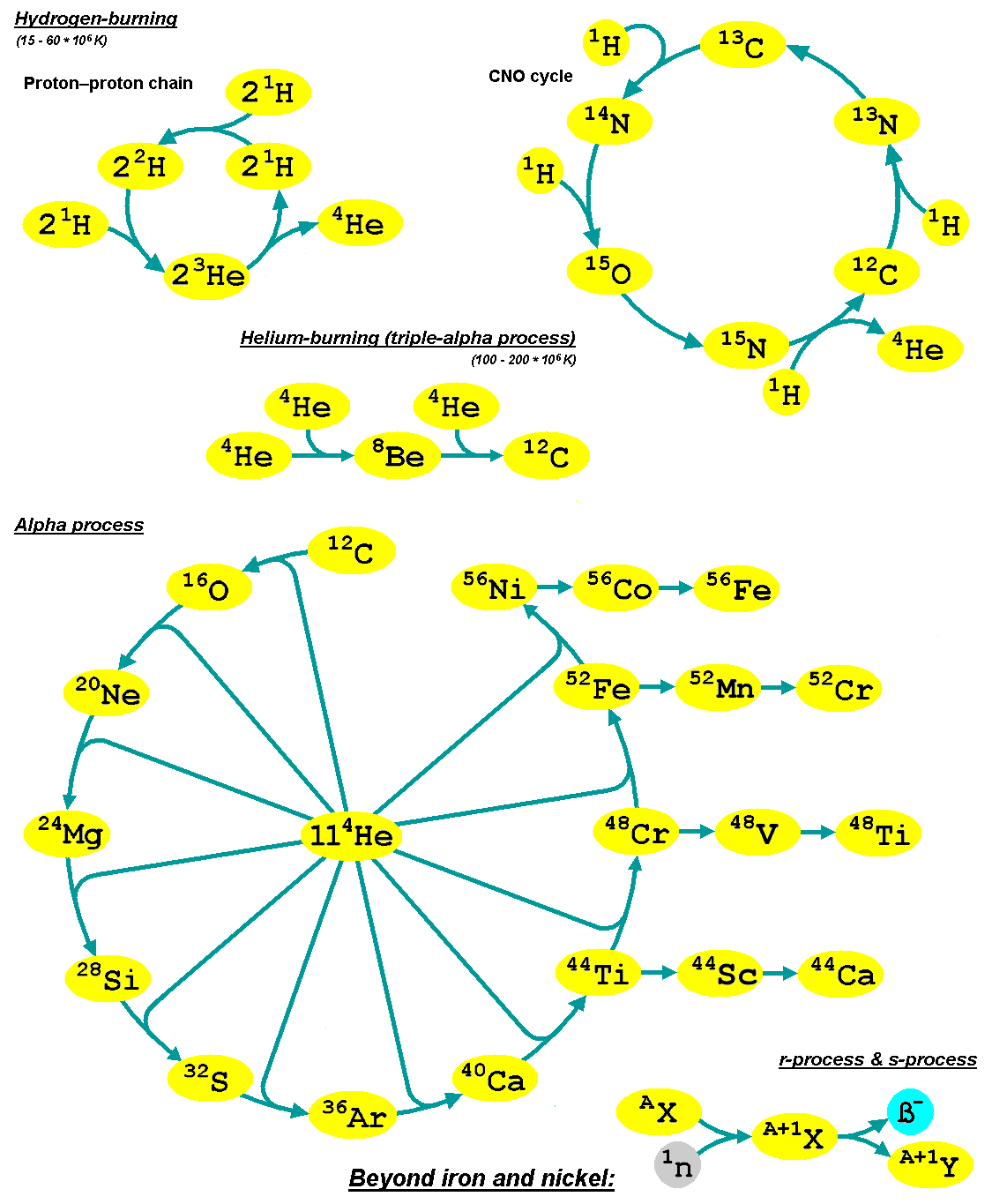
Creation of elements beyond carbon through alpha process

The alpha process, also known as alpha capture or the alpha ladder, is one of two classes of nuclear fusion reactions by which stars convert helium into heavier elements. The other class is a cycle of reactions called the triple-alpha process, which consumes only helium, and produces carbon. The alpha process most commonly occurs in massive stars and during supernovae.

Both processes are preceded by hydrogen fusion, which produces the helium that fuels both the triple-alpha process and the alpha ladder processes. After the triple-alpha process has produced enough carbon, the alpha-ladder begins and fusion reactions of increasingly heavy elements take place, in the order listed below. Each step only consumes the product of the previous reaction and helium. The later-stage reactions which are able to begin in any particular star, do so while the prior stage reactions are still under way in outer layers of the star.

$$\begin{array}{ll}
\ce{ ~{}_6^{12}C\ ~~+ {}_2^4He\ -> ~{}_{8}^{16}O\ \ ~+ \gamma~,}& E=\mathsf{7.16\ MeV}
\\
\ce{ ~{}_8^{16}O\ ~~+ {}_2^4He\ -> {}_{10}^{20}Ne\ \ + \gamma~,}& E=\mathsf{4.73\ MeV}
\\
\ce{ {}_{10}^{20}Ne\ ~+ {}_2^4He\ -> {}_{12}^{24}Mg\ + \gamma~,}& E=\mathsf{9.32\ MeV}
\\
\ce{ {}_{12}^{24}Mg\ + {}_2^4He\ -> {}_{14}^{28}Si\  ~~+ \gamma~,}& E=\mathsf{9.98\ MeV}
\\
\ce{ {}_{14}^{28}Si\ ~~+ {}_2^4He\ -> {}_{16}^{32}S\ \ ~~~+ \gamma~,}& E=\mathsf{6.95\ MeV}
\\
\ce{ {}_{16}^{32}S\ ~~~+ {}_2^4He\ -> {}_{18}^{36}Ar\ ~\ + \gamma~,}& E=\mathsf{6.64\ MeV}
\\
\ce{ {}_{18}^{36}Ar\ ~+ {}_2^4He\ -> {}_{20}^{40}Ca\ \ + \gamma~,}& E=\mathsf{7.04\ MeV}
\\
\ce{ {}_{20}^{40}Ca\ + {}_2^4He\ -> {}_{22}^{44}Ti\ ~~+ \gamma~,}& E=\mathsf{5.13\ MeV}
\\
\ce{ {}_{22}^{44}Ti\ ~+ {}_2^4He\ -> {}_{24}^{48}Cr\ ~+ \gamma~,}& E=\mathsf{7.70\ MeV}
\\
\ce{ {}_{24}^{48}Cr\ + {}_2^4He\ -> {}_{26}^{52}Fe\ ~\ + \gamma~,}& E=\mathsf{7.94\ MeV}
\\
\ce{ {}_{26}^{52}Fe\ + {}_2^4He\ -> {}_{28}^{56}Ni\ ~\ + \gamma~,}& E=\mathsf{8.00\ MeV}
\end{array}$$

The energy produced by each reaction, E, is mainly in the form of gamma rays (γ), with a small amount taken by the byproduct element, as added momentum.

Binding energy per nucleon for a selection of nuclides. Not listed is ^{62}Ni, with the highest binding energy at 8.7945 MeV.

It is a common misconception that the above sequence ends at $\, {}_{28}^{56}\mathrm{Ni} \,$ (or $\, {}_{26}^{56}\mathrm{Fe} \,$, which is a decay product of $\, {}_{28}^{56}\mathrm{Ni} \,$) because it is the most tightly bound nuclide – i.e., the nuclide with the highest nuclear binding energy per nucleon – and production of heavier nuclei would consume energy (be endothermic) instead of release it (exothermic). $\, {}_{28}^{62}\mathrm{Ni} \,$ (Nickel-62) is actually the most tightly bound nuclide in terms of binding energy (though ${}^{56}\textrm{Fe}$ has a lower energy or mass per nucleon). The reaction ${}^{56}\textrm{Fe}+{}^{4}\textrm{He}\rightarrow {}^{60}\textrm{Ni}$ is actually exothermic, and indeed adding alphas continues to be exothermic all the way to $\ {}_{50}^{100}\mathrm{Sn}\$, but nonetheless the sequence does effectively end at iron. The sequence stops before producing elements heavier than nickel because conditions in stellar interiors cause the competition between photodisintegration and the alpha process to favor photodisintegration around iron. This leads to more $\, {}_{28}^{56}\mathrm{Ni} \,$ being produced than $\, {}_{28}^{62}\mathrm{Ni} ~.$

All these reactions have a very low rate at the temperatures and densities in stars and therefore do not contribute significant energy to a star's total output. They occur even less easily with elements heavier than neon (Z > 10) due to the increasing Coulomb barrier.

== Alpha process elements ==
Alpha process elements (or alpha elements) are so-called since their most abundant isotopes are integer multiples of four – the mass of the helium nucleus (the alpha particle). These isotopes are called alpha nuclides.

Logarithm of the relative energy output (ε) of proton–proton (p-p), CNO, and triple-α fusion processes at different temperatures (T). The dashed line shows the combined energy generation of the p-p and CNO processes within a star.

- The stable alpha elements are: C, O, Ne, Mg, Si, and S.
- The elements Ar and Ca are "observationally stable". They are synthesized by alpha capture prior to the silicon fusing stage, that leads to Type II supernovae.
- Si and Ca are purely alpha process elements.
- Mg can be separately consumed by proton capture reactions.

The status of oxygen (O) is contested – some authors consider it an alpha element, while others do not. O is surely an alpha element in low-metallicity Population II stars: It is produced in Type II supernovae, and its enhancement is well correlated with an enhancement of other alpha process elements.

Sometimes C and N are considered alpha process elements since, like O, they are synthesized in nuclear alpha-capture reactions, but their status is ambiguous: Each of the three elements is produced (and consumed) by the CNO cycle, which can proceed at temperatures far lower than those where the alpha-ladder processes start producing significant amounts of alpha elements (including C, N, & O). So just the presence of C, N, or O in a star does not clearly indicate that the alpha process is actually underway – hence reluctance of some astronomers to (unconditionally) call these three "alpha elements".

== Production in stars ==
The alpha process generally occurs in large quantities only if the star is sufficiently massive – more massive than about 10 solar masses. These stars contract as they age, increasing core temperature and density to high enough levels to enable the alpha process. Requirements increase with atomic mass, especially in later stages – sometimes referred to as silicon burning – and thus most commonly occur in supernovae. Type II supernovae mainly synthesize oxygen and the alpha-elements (Ne, Mg, Si, S, Ar, Ca, and Ti) while Type Ia supernovae mainly produce elements of the iron peak (Ti, V, Cr, Mn, Fe, Co, and Ni). Sufficiently massive stars can synthesize elements up to and including the iron peak solely from the hydrogen and helium that initially compose the star.

Typically, the first stage of the alpha process (or alpha-capture) follows from the helium-burning stage of the star once helium becomes depleted; at this point, free ${}_6^{12}\textrm{C}$ capture helium to produce ${}_{8}^{16}\textrm{O}$. This process continues after the core finishes the helium burning phase as a shell around the core will continue burning helium and convecting into the core. The second stage (neon burning) starts as helium is freed by the photodisintegration of one ${}_{10}^{20}\textrm{Ne}$ atom, allowing another to continue up the alpha ladder. Silicon burning is then later initiated through the photodisintegration of ${}_{14}^{28}\textrm{Si}$ in a similar fashion; after this point, the $\, {}_{28}^{56}\mathrm{Ni} \,$peak discussed previously is reached. The supernova shock wave produced by stellar collapse provides ideal conditions for these processes to briefly occur.

During this terminal heating involving photodisintegration and rearrangement, nuclear particles are converted to their most stable forms during the supernova and subsequent ejection through, in part, alpha processes. Starting at ${}_{22}^{44}\textrm{Ti}$ and above, all the product elements are radioactive and will therefore decay into a more stable isotope; for instance, $\, {}_{28}^{56}\mathrm{Ni} \,$ is formed and decays into ${}_{26}^{56}\textrm{Fe}$.

== Special notation for relative abundance ==
The abundance of total alpha elements in stars is usually expressed in terms of logarithms, with astronomers customarily using a square bracket notation:

$$\left[ \frac{ \alpha }{\, \ce{Fe} \,} \right] ~\equiv~ \log_{10}{\left(\, \frac{ N_{\mathrm{E}\alpha} }{\, N_\ce{Fe} \,} \,\right)_\star} - \log_{10}{\left(\frac{ N_{\mathrm{E}\alpha} }{\, N_\ce{Fe} \,}\,\right)_\odot } ~,$$

where $\, N_{\mathrm{E}\alpha} \,$ is the number of alpha elements per unit volume, and $\, N_\ce{Fe} \,$ is the number of iron nuclei per unit volume. It is for the purpose of calculating the number $\, N_{\mathrm{E}\alpha} \,$ that which elements are to be considered "alpha elements" becomes contentious. Theoretical galactic evolution models predict that early in the universe there were more alpha elements relative to iron.

== See also ==
- [α/Fe] versus [Fe/H] diagram
- Alpha-enhanced stars with anomalous ages
