= Galactic halo =

Spherical component of a galaxy

A galactic halo is an extended, roughly spherical component of a galaxy which extends beyond the main, visible component. Several distinct components of a galaxy comprise its halo:

- the stellar halo
- the galactic corona (hot gas, i.e. a plasma)
- the dark matter halo

The distinction between the halo and the main body of the galaxy is clearest in spiral galaxies, where the spherical shape of the halo contrasts with the flat disc. In an elliptical galaxy, there is no sharp transition between the other components of the galaxy and the halo.

A halo can be studied by observing its effect on the passage of light from distant bright objects like quasars that are in line of sight beyond the galaxy in question.

== Components of the galactic halo ==
=== Stellar halo ===
The stellar halo is a nearly spherical population of field stars and globular clusters. It surrounds most disk galaxies as well as some elliptical galaxies of type cD. A low amount (about one percent) of a galaxy's stellar mass resides in the stellar halo, meaning its luminosity is much lower than other components of the galaxy.

The Milky Way's stellar halo contains globular clusters, RR Lyrae stars with low metallicity, and subdwarfs. In our stellar halo, stars tend to be old (most are greater than 12 billion years old) and metal-poor, but there are also halo star clusters with observed metal content similar to disk stars. The halo stars of the Milky Way have an observed radial velocity dispersion of about 200 kilometres per second and a low average velocity of rotation of about 50 km/s. Star formation in the stellar halo of the Milky Way ceased long ago. Most galaxies similarly have little to no star formation in their halos. Some galaxies do continue to undergo star formation in their halos, notably NGC 4236, which has an active stellar halo.

=== Galactic corona ===
A galactic corona is a distribution of gas extending far away from the center of the galaxy. It can be detected by the distinct emission spectrum it gives off, showing the presence of atomic neutral hydrogen (the H I region, pronounced "H-one") and other features detectable by X-ray spectroscopy.

=== Dark matter halo ===
The dark matter halo is a theorized distribution of dark matter which extends throughout the galaxy extending far beyond its visible components. The mass of the dark matter halo is far greater than the mass of the other components of the galaxy. Its existence is hypothesized in order to account for the gravitational potential that determines the dynamics of bodies within galaxies. The nature of dark matter halos is an important area in current research in cosmology, in particular its relation to galactic formation and evolution.

The Navarro–Frenk–White profile is a widely accepted density profile of the dark matter halo determined through numerical simulations. It represents the mass density of the dark matter halo as a function of $r$, the distance from the galactic center:

$$\rho (r) = \frac{\rho_\text{crit} \delta_{c}}{(r/r_{s})(1+r/r_{s})^{2}}$$

where $r_{s}$ is a characteristic radius for the model, $\rho_\text{crit} = 3H^2/8 \pi G$ is the critical density (with $H$ being the Hubble constant), and $\delta_c$ is a dimensionless constant. The invisible halo component cannot extend with this density profile indefinitely, however; this would lead to a diverging integral when calculating mass. It does, however, provide a finite gravitational potential for all $r$. Most measurements that can be made are relatively insensitive to the outer halo's mass distribution. This is a consequence of Newton's laws, which state that if the shape of the halo is spheroidal or elliptical there will be no net gravitational effect from halo mass a distance $r$ from the galactic center on an object that is closer to the galactic center than $r$. The only dynamical variable related to the extent of the halo that can be constrained is the escape velocity: the fastest-moving stellar objects still gravitationally bound to the Galaxy can give a lower bound on the mass profile of the outer edges of the dark halo.

== Formation of galactic halos ==
The formation of stellar halos occurs naturally in a cold dark matter model of the universe in which the evolution of systems such as halos occurs from the bottom-up, meaning the large scale structure of galaxies is formed starting with small objects. Halos, which are composed of both baryonic and dark matter, form by merging with each other. Evidence suggests that the formation of galactic halos may also be due to the effects of increased gravity and the presence of primordial black holes. The gas from halo mergers goes toward the formation of the central galactic components, while stars and dark matter remain in the galactic halo.

On the other hand, the halo of the Milky Way Galaxy is thought to derive from the Gaia Sausage.

== See also ==
- Disc galaxy – Type of galactic form
- Galactic bulge – Tightly packed group of stars within a larger formation
- Galactic corona – Hot, ionised, gaseous component of a galactic halo
- Galactic coordinate system – Celestial coordinate system in spherical coordinates, with the Sun as its center
- Galaxy formation and evolution – Subfield of cosmology
- Spiral arm – Spiral-shaped regions of enhanced brightness within the galactic disc in spiral galaxies
