= Thin disk =

Structural component of galaxies

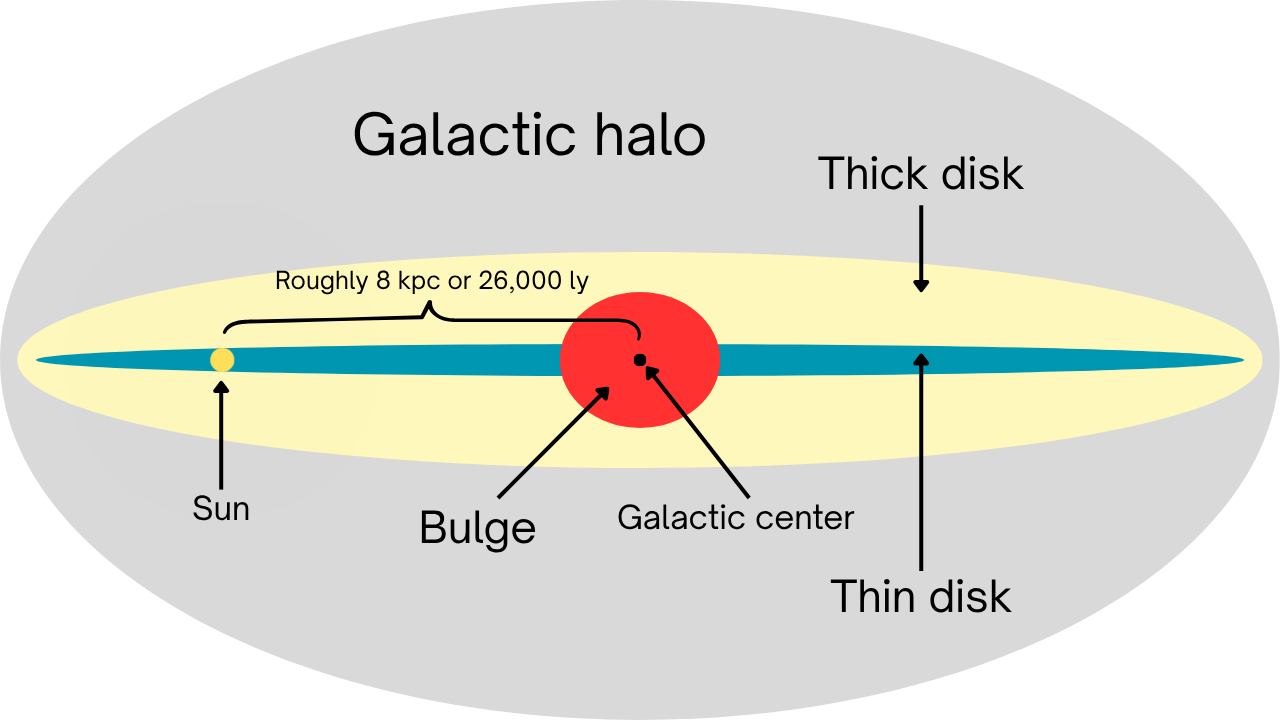
Edge-on view of the Milky Way (not drawn to scale). The thin disk is shown in green-blue.

A thin disk is a structural component of spiral and S0-type galaxies, composed of stars, gas and dust. It is the main non-centre (e.g. galactic bulge) density of such matter. The thin disk of the Milky Way is thought to have a scale height of around 300–400 parsecs (980–1,300 ly) in the vertical axis perpendicular to the disk, and a scale length of around 2.5–4.5 kiloparsecs (8.2–14.7 kly) in the horizontal axis, in the direction of the radius. However, new data from the Gaia DR3 studies suggest a smaller scale height of 280 ± 12.5 pc (912 ± 40.75 ly).

For comparison, the Sun is 8 kiloparsecs (26 kly) out from the center. The thin disk contributes about 85% of the stars in the Galactic plane and 95% of the total stars in the disk. It can be set apart from the thick disk of a galaxy since the latter is composed of older population stars created at an earlier stage of galaxy formation and thus has fewer heavy elements. Stars in the thin disk, on the other hand, are created as a result of gas accretion at the later stages of galaxy formation and are on average more metal-rich.

The thin disk contains stars with a wide range of ages and may be divided into a series of sub-populations of increasing age. Nevertheless, it is considered to be considerably younger than the thick disk.

Based upon the emerging science of nucleocosmochronology, the galactic thin disk of the Milky Way is estimated to have been formed 8.8 ± 1.7 billion years ago. It may have collided with a smaller satellite galaxy, causing the stars in the thin disk to be shaken up and creating the thick disk, while the gas would have settled into the galactic plane and reformed the thin disk.

== See also ==
- Disc galaxy
- Galaxy formation and evolution
- Galactic corona
- Galactic halo
- Galactic spheroid
- Spiral arm
- Thick disk
