= Gyrochronology =

Method of estimating a stars age from its rotation period

Gyrochronology is a method for estimating the age of a low-mass (cool) main sequence star (spectral class F8 V or later) from its rotation period. The term is derived from the Greek words gyros, chronos and logos, roughly translated as rotation, age, and study respectively. It was coined in 2003 by Sydney Barnes to describe the associated procedure for deriving stellar ages, and developed extensively in empirical form in 2007.

Gyrochronology builds on a work of Andrew Skumanich, who found that the average value of (v sin i) for several open clusters was inversely proportional to the square root of the cluster's age. In the expression (v sin i), (v) is the velocity on the star's equator and (i) is the inclination angle of the star's axis of rotation, which is generally an unmeasurable quantity. The gyrochronology method depends on the relationship between the rotation period and the mass of low mass main-sequence stars of the same age, which was verified by early work on the Hyades open cluster. The associated age estimate for a star is known as the gyrochronological age.

== Overview ==
The basic idea underlying gyrochronology is that the rotation period P, of a cool main-sequence star is a deterministic function of its age t and its mass M (or a suitable substitute such as color). Although main sequence stars of a given mass form with a range of rotation periods, their periods increase rapidly and converge to a well defined value as they lose angular momentum through magnetically channelled stellar winds. Therefore, their periods converge to a certain function of age and mass, mathematically denoted by P=P(t,M). Consequently, cool stars do not occupy the entire 3-dimensional parameter space of (mass, age, period), but instead define a 2-dimensional surface in this P-t-M space. Therefore, measuring two of these variables yields the third. Of these quantities, the mass (color) and the rotation period are the easier variables to measure, providing access to the star's age, otherwise difficult to obtain.

In order to determine the shape of this P=P(t,M) surface, the rotation periods and photometric colors (mass) of stars in clusters of known age are measured. Data has been accumulated from several clusters younger than one billion years (Gyr) of age and one cluster with an age of 2.5 Gyr. Another data point on the surface is from the Sun with an age of 4.56 Gyr and a rotation period of 25 days. Using these results, the ages of a large number of cool galactic field stars can be derived with 10% precision.

Magnetic stellar wind breaking increases the rotation period of the star and it is important in stars with convective envelopes. Stars with a color index greater than about (B-V)=0.47 mag (the Sun has a color index of 0.66 mag) have convective envelopes, but more massive stars have radiative envelopes. Also, these lower mass stars spend a considerable amount of time on a pre main sequence Hayashi track where they are nearly fully convective.

== See also ==
- Nucleocosmochronology
