= Julie Lutz =

American mathematician

Julie Haynes Lutz (1944–2022) was an astronomer and mathematician who studies planetary nebulae and symbiotic binary stars. Lutz was the Boeing Distinguished Professor of Mathematics and Science Education and director of the astronomy program at Washington State University. She moved to the University of Washington in 2000, where she held a position as professor emeritus. Lutz died on May 3, 2022.

== Education and career ==
Julie Haynes did her undergraduate studies at San Diego State University. She earned her doctorate at the University of Illinois at Urbana–Champaign, where she also met and married fellow astronomy graduate student Thomas E. Lutz.

She joined the Washington State faculty in 1971. At Washington State, she chaired the Department of Pure and Applied Mathematics from 1992 to 1996, and was active in improving primary and secondary school science education. She also served as president of the Astronomical Society of the Pacific from 1991 to 1993.

== Recognition ==
Lutz was a Fellow of the Royal Astronomical Society and of the American Association for the Advancement of Science. In 2004 the United Negro College Fund gave Lutz and her husband, astronomer George Wallerstein, their President's Award for their long-term and substantial fund-raising activities for the organization.
