= George Wallerstein =

United States astronomer (1930–2021)

- Born: January 13, 1930
- Died: May 13, 2021 (aged 91)
- Spouse: Julie Lutz

Academic background
- Education: Ph.D., California Institute of Technology
- Thesis: Spectra of Population II Cepheid Variable Stars (1958)
- Doctoral advisor: Jesse L. Greenstein

Academic work
- Discipline: Astronomy
- Institutions: University of Washington

George Wallerstein (January 13, 1930 – May 13, 2021) was an American astronomer who researched the chemical composition of stellar atmospheres. The son of German immigrants, he was raised in New York City during the Great Depression. In school he developed an interest in boxing and won the senior class boxing award. He graduated from Brown University in 1951 before receiving his M.S. and Ph.D. from the California Institute of Technology.

He served in the Navy during the Korean War, then, after teaching at the University of California, joined the astronomy department of the University of Washington in 1965. In March 1998, he retired from the University and was appointed Professor Emeritus. At the time of his death, he was married to the astronomer Julie Lutz. He was the earliest user of the (α/Fe) versus (Fe/H) diagram notation, his paper using this notation was published in 1962.

In 2002, he won the Henry Norris Russell Lectureship. In 2004, he was presented the President's Award by the United Negro College Fund for his contributions to diversity. He served on the Board of Directors for the NAACP Legal Defense Fund and the National Advisory Board of the Center for Arms Control and Non-Proliferation, the research arm of Council for a Livable World.

He was elected a Legacy Fellow of the American Astronomical Society in 2020.

American astrophysicist Emily Levesque described Wallerstein in her 2020 popular science book The Last Stargazers: The Enduring Story of Astronomy's Vanishing Explorers: "George is a champion boxer, a licensed pilot, an accomplished mountaineer, and an award-winning humanitarian. [...] In pretty much any research discussion, George can be counted on to chime in and recite, from memory, exact results from hundreds of scientific papers dating back to the 1930s along with a choice tale or two about the researchers who did the work".
