= Thick disk =

Structural component of some galaxies

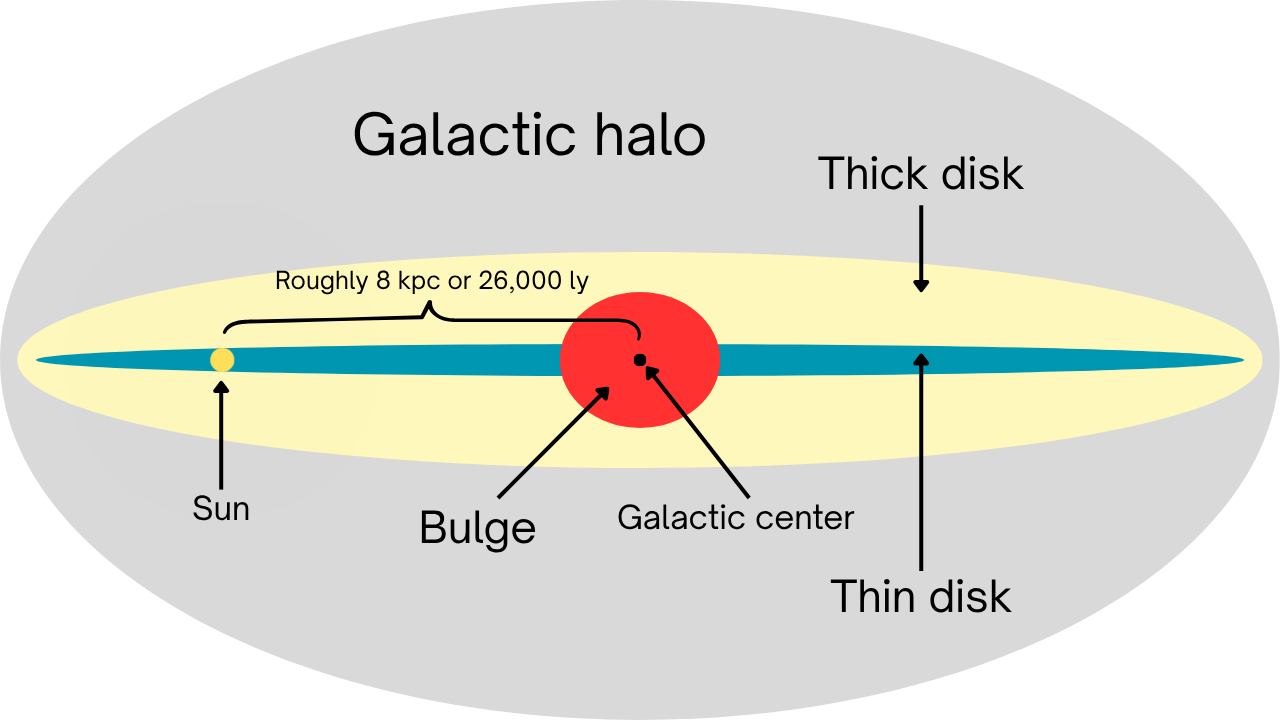
Edge-on view of the Milky Way (not drawn to scale). The thick disk is shown in light yellow.

A thick disk is one of the structural components of about 2/3 of all disk galaxies, including the Milky Way. It was discovered first in external edge-on galaxies. Soon after, it was proposed as a distinct galactic structure in the Milky Way, different from the thin disk and the halo. It is thought to dominate the stellar number density between 1 and 5 kiloparsecs (3.3 and 16.3 kly) above the galactic plane and, in the solar neighborhood, is composed almost exclusively of older stars. For the Milky Way, the thick disk has a scale height of around 0.6–1.1 kiloparsecs (2.0–3.6 kly) in the axis perpendicular to the disk, which is 3-4 times larger than the thin disk, and a scale length of around 1.9–2.3 kiloparsecs (6.2–7.5 kly) in the horizontal axis, in the direction of the radius. Its stellar chemistry and stellar kinematics (composition and motion of its stars) also set it apart from the thin disk. Compared to the thin disk, thick disk stars typically have significantly lower levels of metals—that is, the abundance of elements other than hydrogen and helium.

The thick disk is a source of early kinematic and chemical evidence for a galaxy's composition and thus is regarded as a very significant component for understanding galaxy formation.

With the availability of observations at larger distances away from the Sun, it has become apparent that the Milky Way thick disk does not have the same chemical and age composition at all distances from the galactic centre. Instead, it is metal-poor inside the solar radius, but becomes more metal-rich outside it. Additionally, observations have revealed that the average stellar age of thick disk stars quickly decreases as one moves from the inner to the outer disk. The thick disk's age has also been used to date an object from outside the Solar System. Applying the Ōtautahi–Oxford model of the interstellar object population to the trajectory of the interstellar comet 3I/ATLAS, Hopkins and colleagues concluded in 2025 that the comet probably originated among the stars of the thick disk, and, from the typical ages of thick disk stars, estimated with 68 percent confidence that it is between 7.6 and 14 billion years old, which would make it older than the Solar System and possibly the oldest comet yet seen.

== Origin ==
Various scenarios for the formation of this structure have been proposed, including:

- Thick disks come from the heating of the thin disk
- It is a result of a merger event between the Milky Way and a dwarf galaxy
- More energetic stars migrate outwards from the inner galaxy to form a thick disk at larger radii
- The disk forms thick at high redshift with the thin disk forming later
- Disk flaring combined with inside-out disk formation
- Scattering by massive clumps:

Stars born in massive gas clumps tend to be scattered into a thick disc, and to be enriched in alpha process elements
Stars formed outside of such clumps tend to settle into a thin disc, and are alpha-element poor

== Dispute ==
Although the thick disk is mentioned as a bona fide galactic structure in numerous scientific studies and is thought to be a common component of disk galaxies in general, its nature is still under dispute. The view of the thick disk as a single separate component has been questioned by a series of papers that describe the galactic disk with a continuous spectrum of components with different thicknesses.

== See also ==
- Galactic coordinate system
- Galaxy formation and evolution

Galaxy parts

- Galactic bulge
- Spiral arm
- Thin disk
