= Galactic disc =

Component of disc galaxies comprising gas and stars

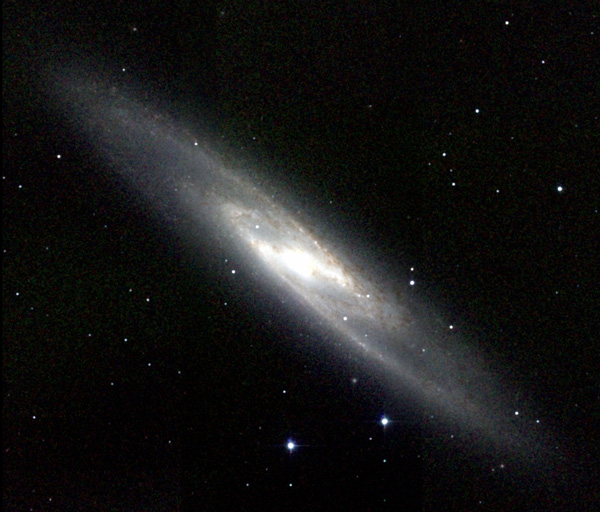
The Sculptor Galaxy (NGC 253) is an example of a disc galaxy

A galactic disc (or galactic disk) is a component of disc galaxies, such as spiral galaxies like the Milky Way and lenticular galaxies. Galactic discs consist of a stellar component (composed of most of the galaxy's stars) and a gaseous component (mostly composed of cool gas and dust). The stellar population of galactic discs tends to exhibit very little random motion with most of its stars undergoing nearly circular orbits about the galactic center. Discs can be fairly thin because the disc material's motion lies predominantly on the plane of the disc (very little vertical motion). The Milky Way's disc, for example, is approximately 1 kilolight-year thick, but thickness can vary for discs in other galaxies.

== Stellar component ==
=== Exponential surface brightness profiles ===
Galactic discs have surface brightness profiles that very closely follow exponential functions in both the radial and vertical directions.

==== Radial profile ====
The surface brightness radial profile of the galactic disc of a typical disc galaxy (viewed face-on) roughly follows an exponential function:

$$I(R) = I_{0} \exp \left[{-\frac{R}{h_R}}\right],$$

where $I_0$ is the galaxy's central brightness and $h_R$ is the scale length. The scale length is the radius at which the galaxy is a factor of e (≈2.7) less bright than it is at its center. Due to the diversity in the shapes and sizes of galaxies, not all galactic discs follow this simple exponential form in their brightness profiles. Some galaxies have been found to have discs with profiles that become truncated in the outermost regions.

==== Vertical profile ====
When viewed edge-on, the vertical surface brightness profiles of galactic discs follow a very similar exponential profile that is proportional to the disc's radial profile:

$$I(R,z) = I(R)\exp \left[ -\frac{\vert z \vert}{h_z} \right] = I_0\exp \left[-\left(\frac{R}{h_R}+\frac{\vert z \vert}{h_z}\right) \right],$$

where $h_z \approx 0.1h_R$ is the scale height. Although exponential profiles serve as a useful first approximation, vertical surface brightness profiles can also be more complicated. For example, the scale height $h_z$, although assumed to be a constant above, can in some cases increase with the radius.

== Gaseous component ==
Most of a disc galaxy's gas lies within the disc. Both cool atomic hydrogen (HI) and warm molecular hydrogen (HII) make up most of the disc's gaseous component. This gas serves as the fuel for the formation of new stars in the disc. Although the distribution of gas in the disc is not as well-defined as the stellar component's distribution it is understood (from 21cm emission) that atomic hydrogen is distributed fairly uniformly throughout the disc. 21 cm emission by HI also reveals that the gaseous component can flare out at the outer regions of the galaxy. The abundance of molecular hydrogen makes it a great candidate to help trace the dynamics within the disc. Like the stars within the disc, clumps or clouds of gas follow approximately circular orbits about the galactic center. The circular velocity of the gas in the disc is strongly correlated with the luminosity of the galaxy (see Tully–Fisher relation). This relationship becomes stronger when the stellar mass is also taken into consideration.

== Structure of the Milky Way disc ==
Three stellar components with varying scale heights can be distinguished within the disc of the Milky Way (MW): the young thin disc, the old thin disc, and the thick disc. The young thin disc is a region in which star formation is taking place and contains the MW's youngest stars and most of its gas and dust. The scale height of this component is roughly 100 pc. The old thin disc has a scale height of approximately 325 pc while the thick disc has a scale height of 1.5 kpc. Although stars move primarily within the disc, they exhibit a random enough motion in the direction perpendicular to the disc to result in various scale heights for the different disc components. Stars in the MW's thin disc tend to have higher metallicities compared to the stars in the thick disc. The metal-rich stars in the thin disc have metallicities close to that of the sun ($Z \approx 0.02$) and are referred to as population I (pop I) stars while the stars that populate the thick disc are more metal-poor ($Z \approx 0.001$) and are referred to as population II (pop II) stars (see stellar population). These distinct ages and metallicities in the different stellar components of the disc point to a strong relationship between the metallicities and ages of stars.

== See also ==
- Thick disk
- Thin disk
