= Disc galaxy =

Type of galactic form

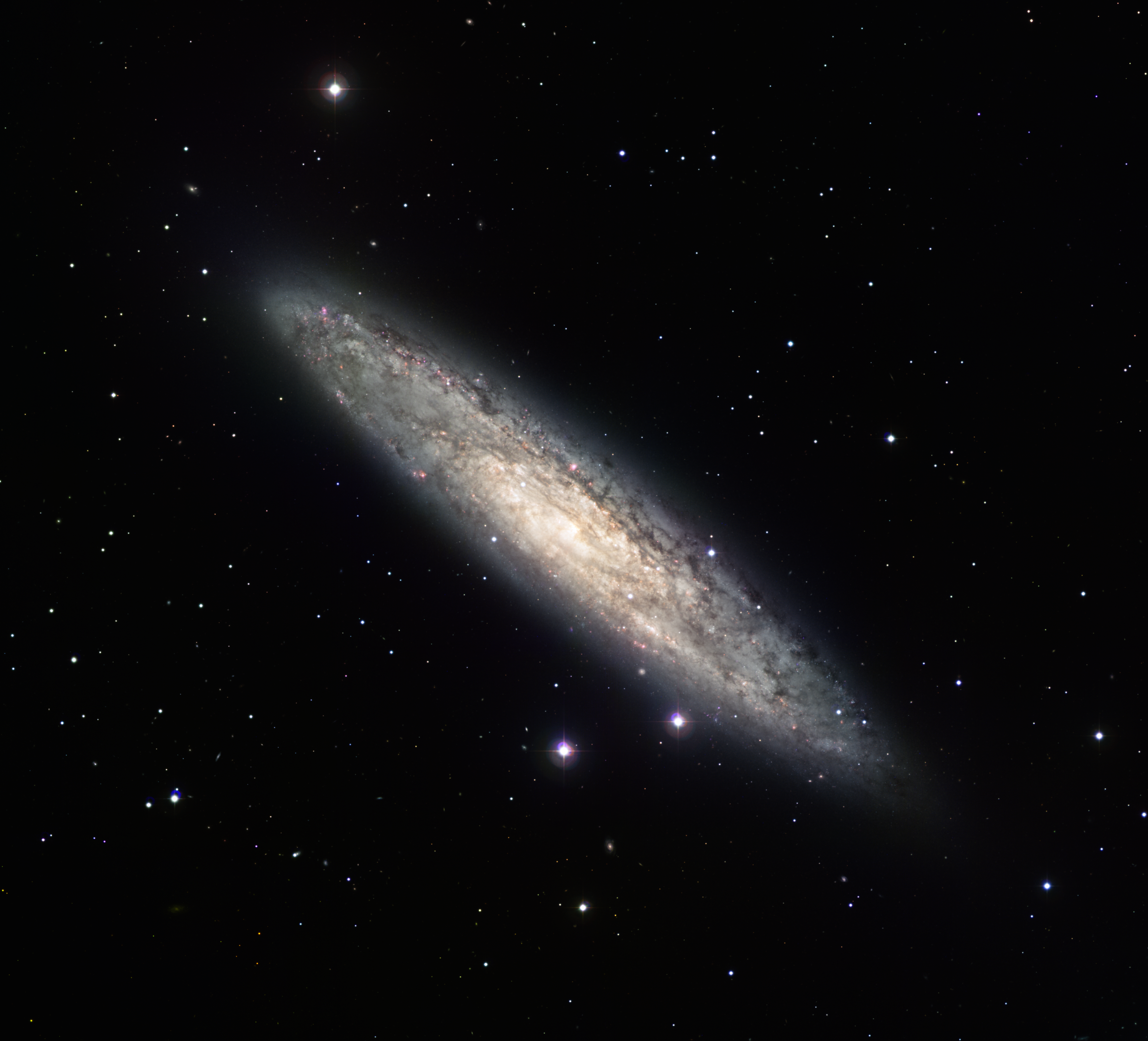
The Sculptor Galaxy (NGC 253) is a disk galaxy.

A disc galaxy (or disk galaxy) is a galaxy characterized by a galactic disc. This is a flattened circular volume of stars that are mainly orbiting the galactic core in the same plane, although not always in the same direction. These galaxies may or may not include a central non-disc-like region (a galactic bulge). They will typically have an orbiting mass of gas and dust in the same plane as the stars. (A lenticular galaxy may be former spiral galaxy from which much of the gas and dust has been stripped.) Interactions with other nearby galaxies can perturb and stretch the galactic disk, sometimes completely disrupting the disk.

Disc galaxy types include:

- Spiral galaxies:
  - Unbarred spiral galaxies: (types S, SA)
  - Barred spiral galaxies: (type SB)
  - Intermediate spiral galaxies: (type SAB)
- Lenticular galaxies: (types E8, S0, SA0, SB0, SAB0)

Galaxies that are not disc types include:

- Elliptical galaxies: (type dE)
- Irregular galaxies: (type dI)

== See also ==
- Thick disk
- Thin disk
