= GOODS-N-774 =

Galaxy in the constellation Ursa Major

Observation data (J2000 epoch)
- Constellation: Ursa Major
- Right ascension: 12^{h} 36^{m} 27.73315^{s}
- Declination: +62° 07′ 12.7652″
- Redshift: 2.3
- Distance: 11 billion ly (3.4 billion pc) (light travel distance); ~18 billion ly (5.5 billion pc) (comoving distance)
- Apparent magnitude (V): 29.6U

Characteristics
- Type: Protogalaxy
- Mass: 1×10^{11} M_{☉}
- Size: 1.8 kpc (5.9 kly)

Other designations
- Sparky, GOODS-N-774, SBM2016 GOODS-N 774, BCW2008 1740, LDD2018 18303

GOODS-N-774 also called "Sparky", is a distant early galaxy which is in the process of core formation. The galaxy is massive and extremely compact, forming stars furiously. It is thought to be on its way to becoming a giant elliptical galaxy. This galaxy was discovered in 2014, and is some 11 billion light years distant. In the sky, it is located in the constellation of Ursa Major. It is the first discovered galaxy in this stage of giant galaxy formation.

== Characteristics ==
Sparky is forming stars at a rate of 300 stars per year, compared to our Milky Way's rate of 10. It is only 6,000 light-years (1,800 parsecs) across, unlike our galaxy's 100 kilolight-years (31 kpc) width. And GOODS-N-774, at 1.0×10^{11}M_{Sun}, is around twice as massive as the Milky Way Galaxy. The amount of star formation and related high concentrations of gas and dust obscure the view of the galaxy, making it hard to detect. The ferocious rate of star formation is thought to be the result of the dark matter halo drawing great amounts of intergalactic gas into the core, fuelling the continuous starburst, of 1 billion years. The galaxy does not contain an active galactic nucleus, confounding some expectations.

== See also ==
- List of galaxies
- List of nearest galaxies
- List of spiral galaxies
