= Outline of galaxies =

The following outline is provided as an overview of and topical guide to galaxies:

Galaxies – gravitationally bound systems of stars, stellar remnants, interstellar gas, dust, and dark matter. The word galaxy is derived from the Greek galaxias (γαλαξίας), literally "milky", a reference to the Milky Way. Galaxies range in size from dwarfs with just a few billion (109) stars to giants with one hundred trillion (1014) stars, each orbiting its galaxy's center of mass. Galaxies are categorized according to their visual morphology as elliptical, spiral and irregular. Many galaxies are thought to have black holes at their active centers.

The Milky Way's central black hole, known as Sagittarius A*, has a mass four million times greater than the Sun. As of March 2016, GN-z11 is the oldest and most distant observed galaxy with a comoving distance of 32 billion light-years from Earth, and observed as it existed just 400 million years after the Big Bang. Previously, as of July 2015, EGSY8p7 was the most distant known galaxy, estimated to have a light travel distance of 13.2 billion light-years away.

== Types of galaxies ==
- List of galaxies
- Lists of galaxies

=== By morphological classification ===
Galaxy morphological classification

- Disc galaxy
  - Lenticular galaxy
  - Barred lenticular galaxy
  - Unbarred lenticular galaxy
- Spiral galaxy (list)
  - Anemic galaxy
  - Barred spiral galaxy
  - Flocculent spiral galaxy
  - Grand design spiral galaxy
  - Intermediate spiral galaxy
  - Magellanic spiral
  - Unbarred spiral galaxy
- Dwarf galaxy
  - Dwarf elliptical galaxy
  - Dwarf galaxy § Common dwarf galaxy types
  - Dwarf spheroidal galaxy
  - Dwarf spiral galaxy
- Elliptical galaxy
  - Type-cD galaxy
- Irregular galaxy
  - Barred irregular galaxy
- Peculiar galaxy
- Ring galaxy (list)
  - Polar-ring galaxy (list)

=== By nucleus ===
Active galactic nucleus

- Blazar
- Low-ionization nuclear emission-line region
- Markarian galaxies
- Quasar
- Radio galaxy
  - X-shaped radio galaxy
- Relativistic jet
- Seyfert galaxy

=== By emissions ===
- Energetic galaxies
  - Lyman-alpha emitter
  - Luminous infrared galaxy
  - Starburst galaxy
    - Dwarf galaxy § Blue Compact Dwarf galaxies
    - Pea galaxy
  - Hot, dust-obscured galaxies (Hot DOGs)
- Low activity
  - Low-surface-brightness galaxy
  - Ultra diffuse galaxy

=== By interaction ===
- Field galaxy
- Galactic tide
- Galaxy cloud
- Interacting galaxy
  - Galaxy merger
- Jellyfish galaxy
- Satellite galaxy
- Stellar kinematics § Stellar streams
- Superclusters
- Galaxy filament
- Void galaxy

=== By other aspect ===
- Galaxies named after people
- Largest galaxies
- Nearest galaxies

== Nature of galaxies ==
=== Galactic phenomena ===
- Galactic year – duration of time required for the Sun to orbit once around the center of the Milky Way Galaxy.
- Galaxy formation and evolution
- Galaxy merger
- Hubble's law

=== Galaxy components ===
- Components of galaxies in general
  - Active galactic nucleus
  - Galactic bulge
  - Galactic disc
  - Galactic habitable zone
  - Galactic halo
    - Dark matter halo
    - Galactic corona
  - Galactic magnetic fields
  - Galactic plane
  - Galactic spheroid
  - Interstellar medium
  - Spiral arms
  - Supermassive black hole
- Structure of specific galaxies
  - Milky Way components
    - Galactic Center
    - Galactic quadrant
    - Spiral arms of the Milky Way
      - Carina–Sagittarius Arm
      - Norma Arm
      - Orion Arm
      - Perseus Arm
      - Scutum–Centaurus Arm
    - Galactic ridge

== Galactic cartography ==
- Galactic coordinate system
  - Galactic longitude
  - Galactic latitude
- Galaxy rotation curve

== Larger constructs composed of galaxies ==
- Galaxy groups and clusters (list)
  - Local Group – galaxy group that includes the Milky Way
  - Galaxy group
  - Galaxy cluster
    - Supercluster (list)
  - Brightest cluster galaxy
  - Fossil galaxy group
- Galaxy filament

=== Intergalactic phenomena ===
- Galactic orientation
- Galaxy merger
  - Andromeda–Milky Way collision
- Hypothetical intergalactic phenomena
  - Intergalactic travel
- Intergalactic dust
- Intergalactic stars
- Void (list)

== Fields that study galaxies ==
- Astronomy
  - Galactic astronomy – studies the Milky Way galaxy.
  - Extragalactic astronomy – studies everything outside the Milky Way galaxy, including other galaxies.
- Astrophysics
- Cosmology
  - Physical cosmology

== Galaxy-related publications ==
=== Galaxy catalogs ===
- Atlas of Peculiar Galaxies
- Catalogue of Galaxies and Clusters of Galaxies
- David Dunlap Observatory Catalogue
- Lyon-Meudon Extragalactic Database
- Morphological Catalogue of Galaxies
- Multiwavelength Atlas of Galaxies
- Principal Galaxies Catalogue
- Shapley-Ames Catalog
- Uppsala General Catalogue
- Vorontsov-Vel'yaminov Interacting Galaxies

== Persons influential in the study of galaxies ==
- Galileo Galilei – discovered that the Milky Way is composed of a huge number of faint stars.
- Edwin Hubble

== See also ==
- Barred spiral galaxy
- Galaxy color–magnitude diagram
- Dark galaxy
- Faint blue galaxy
- Galaxy color–magnitude diagram
- Illustris project
- Protogalaxy
- Metallicity § Stars
  - Cosmos Redshift 7
- Large quasar group § List of LQGs
- List of quasars
