= Protogalaxy =

Gas cloud forming into a galaxy

In physical cosmology, a protogalaxy, which could also be called a "primeval galaxy", is a cloud of gas which is forming into a galaxy. It is believed that the rate of star formation during this period of galactic evolution will determine whether a galaxy is a spiral or elliptical galaxy; a slower star formation tends to produce a spiral galaxy. The smaller clumps of gas in a protogalaxy form into stars.

The term "protogalaxy" itself is generally accepted to mean "Progenitors of the present day (normal) galaxies, in the early stages of formation." However, the "early stages of formation" is not a clearly defined phrase. It could be defined as: "The first major burst of star formation in a progenitor of a present day elliptical galaxy"; "The peak merging epoch of dark halos of the fragments which assemble to produce an average galaxy today"; "A still gaseous body before any star formation has taken place."; or " an over-dense region of dark matter in the very early universe, destined to become gravitationally bound and to collapse."

== Formation ==
It is thought that the early universe began with a nearly uniform distribution (each particle an equal distance from the next) of matter and dark matter. The dark matter then began to clump together under gravitational attraction due to the initial density perturbation spectrum caused by quantum fluctuations. This derives from Heisenberg's uncertainty principle which shows that there can be tiny temporary changes in the amount of energy in empty space. Particle/antiparticle pairs can form from this energy through mass–energy equivalence, and gravitational pull causes other nearby particles to move towards it, disturbing the even distribution and creating a centre of gravity, pulling nearby particles closer. When this happens at the universe's present size it is negligible, but the state of these tiny fluctuations as the universe began expanding from a single point left an impression which scaled up as the universe expanded, resulting in large areas of increased density. The gravity of these denser clumps of dark matter then caused nearby matter to start falling into the denser region. This sort of process was reportedly observed and analysed by Nilsson et al. in 2006. This resulted in the formation of clouds of gas, predominantly hydrogen, and the first stars began to form within these clouds. These clouds of gas and early stars, many times smaller than our galaxy, were the first protogalaxies.

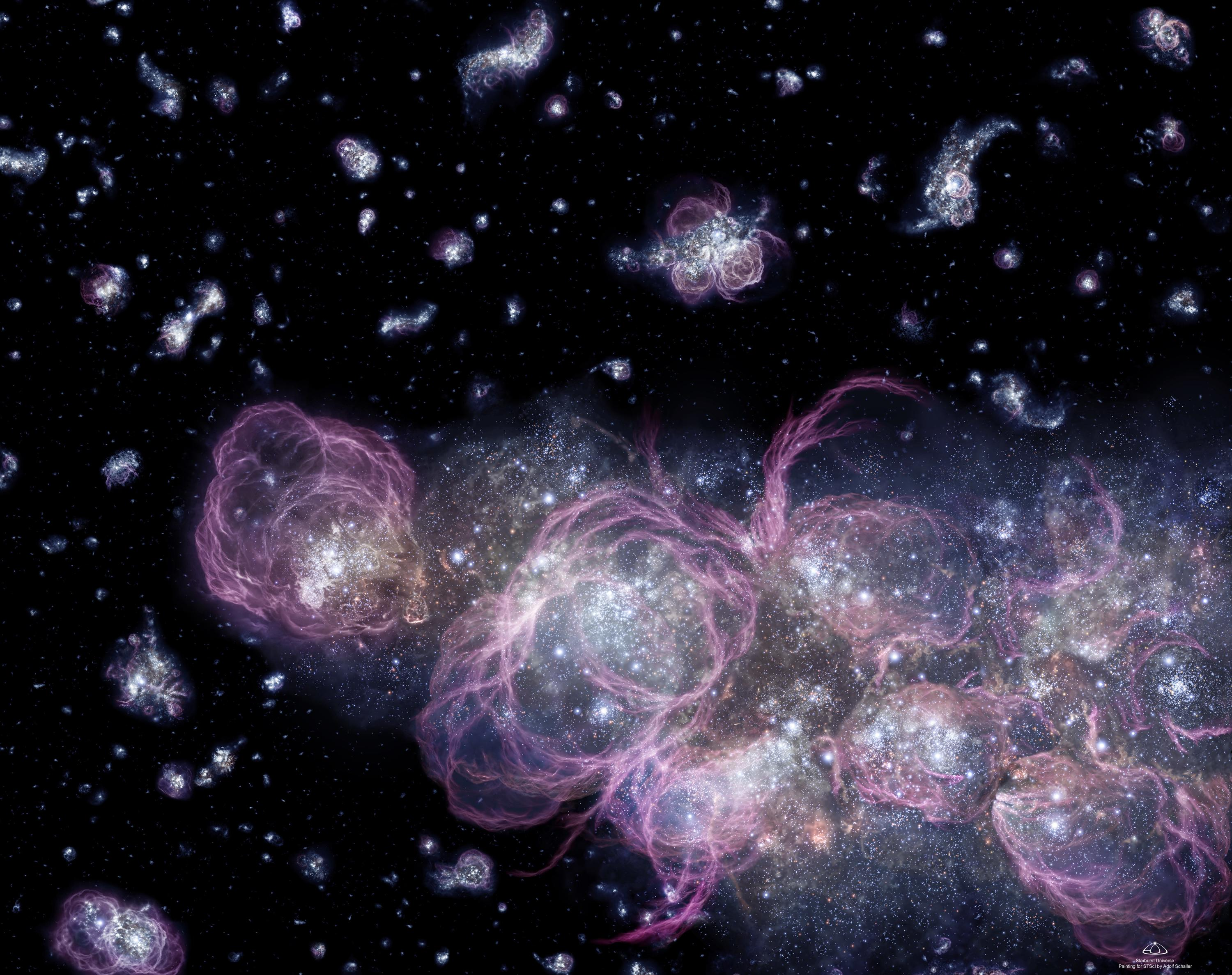
An illustration showing protogalaxies colliding

The established theory is that the groups of small protogalaxies were attracted together by gravity and collided, which resulted in the formation of the much larger "adult" galaxies we have today. This follows the process of hierarchical assembly, which is an ongoing process where larger bodies are continually formed from the merging of smaller ones.

== Properties ==
=== Composition ===
Since there had been no previous star formation to create other elements, protogalaxies would have been made up almost entirely of hydrogen and helium. The hydrogen would bond to form H_{2} molecules, with some exceptions. This would change as star formation began and produced more elements through the process of nuclear fusion.

=== Mechanics ===
Once a protogalaxy begins to form, all particles bound by its gravity begin to free fall towards it. The time taken for this free-fall to conclude can be approximated using the free-fall equations. Most galaxies have completed this free-fall stage to become stable elliptical or disk galaxies, the disks taking longer to fully form. The formation of galaxy clusters takes much longer and is still in progress now. This stage is also where galaxies acquire most of their angular momentum. A protogalaxy acquires this due to gravitational influence from neighbouring dense clumps in the early universe, and the further the gas is away from the centre, the more spin it gets.

=== Luminosity ===
The luminosity of protogalaxies comes from two sources. First and foremost is the radiation from nuclear fusion of Hydrogen into helium in early stars. This early burst of star formation is thought to have made a protogalaxy's luminosity comparable to a present-day starburst galaxy or a quasar. The other is the release of excess gravitational binding energy. The primary wavelength expected from a protogalaxy is a variety of UV called Lyman-alpha, which is the wavelength emitted by Hydrogen gas when it is ionised by radiation from a star.

== Detection ==
Protogalaxies can theoretically still be seen today, as the light from the farthest reaches of the universe takes a very long time to reach Earth, in some places long enough that we see them at the stage where they are populated by protogalaxies. There have been many attempts to find protogalaxies with telescopes over the last 30 years because of the value of such a discovery in confirming how galaxies form, but the sheer distance any light would have to travel for it to be old enough to come from a protogalaxy is very large. This, coupled with the fact that the Lyman-alpha wavelength is quite readily absorbed by dust, made some astronomers think protogalaxies may be too faint to detect.

In 1996, a protogalaxy candidate was discovered by Yee et al. using the Canadian Network for Observational Cosmology (CNOC). The object was a disk-like galaxy at high redshift with a very high luminosity. It was later debated that the incredible luminosity was caused by the gravitational lensing of a foreground galactic cluster.

In 2006, K. Nilsson et al. reported finding a "blob" emitting Lyman alpha UV radiation. Analysis concluded that this was a giant cloud of hydrogen gas falling onto a clump of dark matter in the early universe, creating a protogalaxy.

In 2007, Michael Rauch et al. were using the VLT to search for a signal from intergalactic gas, when they spotted dozens of discrete objects emitting large amounts of the Lyman-alpha type UV radiation. They concluded that these 27 objects were examples of protogalaxies from 11 billion years ago.

== See also ==
- Big Bang
- Galaxy formation and evolution
- GOODS-N-774
