= SDSS J1152+3313 =

Galaxy cluster in the Ursa Maor constellation

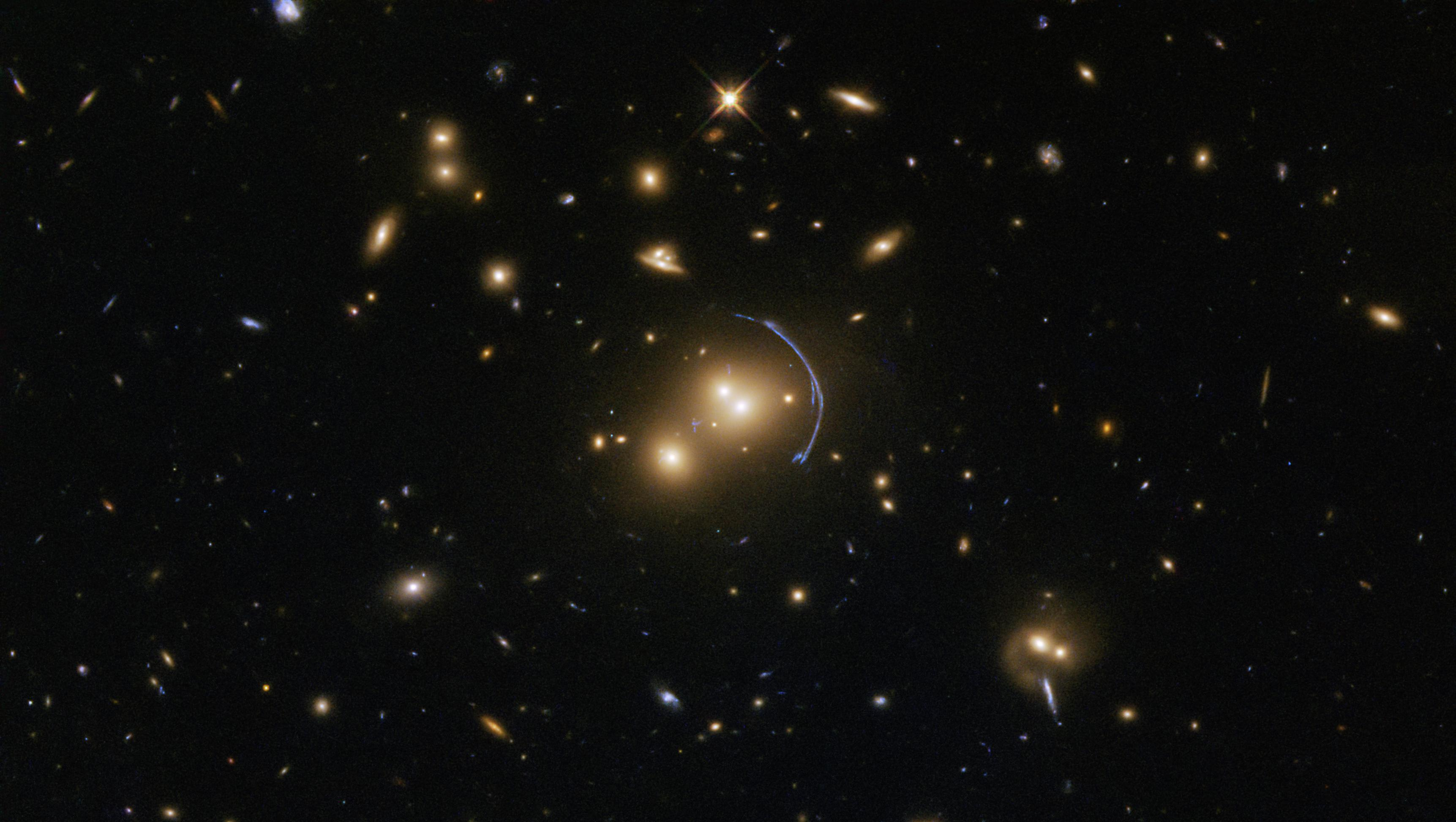
Galaxy Cluster SDSS J1152+3313

SDSS J1152+3313 is a galaxy cluster in the constellation of Ursa Major, approximately 4 billion light-years away. According to NASA, this particular cluster provides a valuable clue about how stars formed in the early universe. NASA and ESA used the Wide Field Camera 3 of the Hubble Space Telescope to image the cluster, which demonstrates the effects of gravitational lensing. The lens of SDSS J1152+3313 is not only warping the appearance of the distant galaxy, but also amplifying its light.
