= Copernican principle =

Principle that humans are not privileged observers of the universe

Unsolved problem in physics
Are cosmological observations made from Earth representative of observations from the average position in the universe?
More unsolved problems in physics

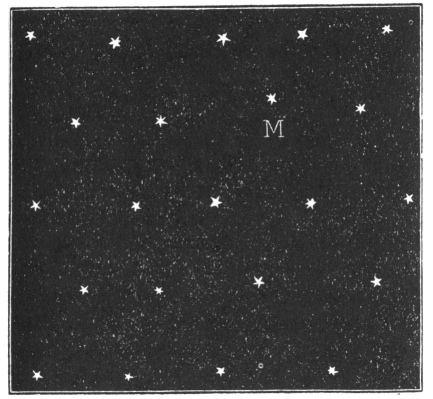
Figure 'M' (for Latin Mundus) from Johannes Kepler's 1617–1621 Epitome Astronomiae Copernicanae, showing the Earth as belonging to just one of any number of similar stars

In physical cosmology, the Copernican principle states that humans are not privileged observers of the universe, that observations from the Earth are representative of observations from the average position in the universe. Named for Copernican heliocentrism, it is a working assumption that arises from a modified cosmological extension of Copernicus' argument of a moving Earth.

== Origin and implications ==
Hermann Bondi named the principle after Copernicus in the mid-20th century, although the principle itself dates back to the 16th–17th century paradigm shift away from the Ptolemaic system, which placed Earth at the center of the universe. Copernicus proposed that the motion of the planets could be explained by reference to an assumption that the Sun is centrally located and stationary in contrast to geocentrism. He argued that the apparent retrograde motion of the planets is an illusion caused by Earth's movement around the Sun, which the Copernican model placed at the centre of the universe. Copernicus himself was mainly motivated by technical dissatisfaction with the earlier system and not by support for any mediocrity principle.

Although the Copernican heliocentric model is often described as "demoting" Earth from its central role it had in the Ptolemaic geocentric model, it was successors to Copernicus, notably the 16th century Giordano Bruno, who adopted this new perspective. The Earth's central position had been interpreted as being in the "lowest and filthiest parts". Instead, as Galileo said, the Earth is part of the "dance of the stars" rather than the "sump where the universe's filth and ephemera collect". In the late 20th Century, Carl Sagan asked, "Who are we? We find that we live on an insignificant planet of a humdrum star lost in a galaxy tucked away in some forgotten corner of a universe in which there are far more galaxies than people."

While the Copernican principle is derived from the negation of past assumptions, such as geocentrism, heliocentrism, or galactocentrism which state that humans are at the center of the universe, the Copernican principle is stronger than acentrism, which merely states that humans are not at the center of the universe. The Copernican principle assumes acentrism and also states that human observers or observations from Earth are representative of observations from the average position in the universe. Michael Rowan-Robinson emphasizes the Copernican principle as the threshold test for modern thought, asserting that: "It is evident that in the post-Copernican era of human history, no well-informed and rational person can imagine that the Earth occupies a unique position in the universe."

Most modern cosmology is based on the assumption that the cosmological principle is almost, but not exactly, true on the largest scales. The Copernican principle represents the irreducible philosophical assumption needed to justify this, when combined with the observations. If one assumes the Copernican principle and observes that the universe appears isotropic or the same in all directions from the vantage point of Earth, then one can infer that the universe is generally homogeneous or the same everywhere (at any given time) and is also isotropic about any given point. These two conditions make up the cosmological principle.

In practice, astronomers observe that the universe has heterogeneous or non-uniform structures up to the scale of galactic superclusters, filaments and great voids. In the current Lambda-CDM model, the predominant model of cosmology in the modern era, the universe is predicted to become more and more homogeneous and isotropic when observed on larger and larger scales, with little detectable structure on scales of more than about 260 million parsecs. However, recent evidence from galaxy clusters, quasars, and type Ia supernovae suggests that isotropy is violated on large scales. Furthermore, various large-scale structures have been discovered, such as the Clowes–Campusano LQG, the Sloan Great Wall, U1.11, the Huge-LQG, the Hercules–Corona Borealis Great Wall, the Giant Arc, and the Local Hole all of which indicate that homogeneity might be violated.

On scales comparable to the radius of the observable universe, we see systematic changes with distance from Earth. For instance, at greater distances, galaxies contain more young stars and are less clustered, and quasars appear more numerous.

If the Copernican principle is assumed, then it follows that this is evidence for the evolution of the universe with time: this distant light has taken most of the age of the universe to reach Earth and shows the universe when it was young. The most distant light of all, cosmic microwave background radiation, is isotropic to at least one part in a thousand.

Bondi and Thomas Gold used the Copernican principle to argue for the perfect cosmological principle which maintains that the universe is also homogeneous in time, and is the basis for the steady-state cosmology. However, this strongly conflicts with the evidence for cosmological evolution mentioned earlier: the universe has progressed from extremely different conditions at the Big Bang, and will continue to progress toward extremely different conditions, particularly under the rising influence of dark energy, apparently toward the Big Freeze or Big Rip.

Since the 1990s the term has been used (interchangeably with "the Copernicus method") for J. Richard Gott's Bayesian-inference-based prediction of duration of ongoing events, a generalized version of the Doomsday argument.

== Tests of the principle ==
The Copernican principle has never been proven, and in the most general sense cannot be proven, but it is implicit in many modern theories of physics. Cosmological models are often derived with reference to the cosmological principle, slightly more general than the Copernican principle, and many tests of these models can be considered tests of the Copernican principle.

=== Relevant History ===
Historically, there have existed inaccurate models of the universe that have placed astronomical objects with importance to humans at the center. In particular, there existed geocentrism, heliocentrism, and galactocentrism, which state that Earth, the Solar System, or the Milky Way respectively were located at the center of the universe. In a sense, this violates the Copernican principle, as being at the center of the universe would be in fact be a privileged position to observe from.

As time went on, it became that clear humans are in fact not special relative to the universe at large. In 1543, Copernicus published his book De revolutionibus orbium coelestium, which introduced the idea of heliocentrism; the subsequent Copernican Revolution moved Earth from the center of the universe to merely a planet orbiting the Sun (which is considered the center of the universe in heliocentrism). In 1718, Edmond Halley published a proof of proper motion (the transverse non-parallax motion of stars); the proof that faraway stars can move presented questions on whether the Sun itself could move. The Sun moving would indicate that it is likely not the center of the Universe, and move humanity further away from the center of the universe. Indeed, in 1783, William Herschel discovered that the Sun is moving.

The final blow to galactocentrism came during the Great Debate, an astronomical dispute in the 1920s regarding whether there existed other galaxies than the Milky Way. Edwin Hubble was able to prove that there are in fact many galaxies in the universe. The end of galctocentrism removed any notion that humanity, or any astronomical objects of importance to it, is at the center of universe, thus bringing about the widespread modern belief in the Copernican principle.

=== Modern tests ===
Recent and planned tests relevant to the cosmological and Copernican principles include:

- time drift of cosmological redshifts;
- modelling the local gravitational potential using reflection of cosmic microwave background (CMB) photons;
- the redshift dependence of the luminosity of supernovae;
- the kinetic Sunyaev–Zeldovich effect in relation to dark energy;
- cosmic neutrino background;
- the integrated Sachs–Wolfe effect;
- testing the isotropy and homogeneity of the CMB;
- observation of the KBC Void – some authors claim it violates the cosmological principle and thus the Copernican principle, while others claim that it is consistent with them.

== Physics without the principle ==
The standard model of cosmology, the Lambda-CDM model, assumes the Copernican principle and the more general cosmological principle. Some cosmologists and theoretical physicists have created models without the cosmological or Copernican principles to constrain the values of observational results, to address specific known issues in the Lambda-CDM model, and to propose tests to distinguish between current models and other possible models.

A prominent example in this context is inhomogeneous cosmology, to model the observed accelerating universe and cosmological constant. Instead of using the current accepted idea of dark energy, inhomogeneous-cosmology models propose that the universe is much more inhomogeneous than currently assumed — for example, that the Solar System is in an extremely large low-density void. To match observations the Solar System would have to be very close to the centre of this void, immediately contradicting the Copernican principle.

While the Big Bang model in cosmology is sometimes said to derive from the Copernican principle in conjunction with redshift observations, the Big Bang model can still be assumed to be valid in absence of the Copernican principle, because the cosmic microwave background, primordial gas clouds, and the structure, evolution, and distribution of galaxies all provide evidence, independent of the Copernican principle, in favor of the Big Bang. However, the key tenets of the Big Bang model, such as the expansion of the universe, become assumptions themselves akin to the Copernican principle, rather than derived from the Copernican principle and observations.

== See also ==
- Absolute space and time
- Anthropic principle
- Axis of evil (cosmology)
- Hubble Bubble (astronomy)
- Mediocrity principle
- Particle chauvinism
- P symmetry
- Rare Earth hypothesis
- The Principle (2014 film)
- Cosmological principle
