= Great Wall (disambiguation) =

The Great Wall of China is a series of stone and earthen fortifications in China.

Great Wall may also refer to:

== Locations ==
- Kumbhalgarh, also known as the Great Wall of India
- Great Wall of Korea (Cheolli Jangseong), two sets of fortifications between Korea and China
- Great Wall of Vietnam (Wall of Quảng Ngãi), a set of fortifications between northern and southern Vietnam
- Southern Great Wall or Miaojiang Great Wall, a fortification in Hunan Province, China
- Great Wall Station, a Chinese research station in Antarctica
- Great wall of Gorgan, a Sasanian-era defense system in Iran
- Underground Great Wall of China
- Great Wall of Sand
- Great Green Wall

== Astronomy ==
- BOSS Great Wall
- CfA2 Great Wall, the original Great Wall of galaxies, or Northern Great Wall
- Hercules–Corona Borealis Great Wall
- Sloan Great Wall

== Business ==
- Great Wall Airlines, a Chinese cargo airline
- Great Wall Motor, a Chinese automobile manufacturer
- Great Wall Supermarket, an American chain of Asian grocery stores
- Great Wall Wine, a Chinese wine producer

== Film ==
- The Great Wall (1962 film), a Daiei studio film
- A Great Wall, 1986 comedy film
- The Great Wall (2016 film), a monster film
- Great Wall Film Company, a Shanghai studio
- Great Wall Movie Enterprises Ltd, a Hong Kong studio

== Literature ==
- The Great Wall of China (short story collection), a collection of short stories by Franz Kafka
  - "The Great Wall of China" (short story), a 1917 short story by Franz Kafka

== Music ==
- Great Wall of China (album), an album by Tangerine Dream
- The Great Wall (soundtrack), a soundtrack album from the 2016 film
- "Great Wall" (song), a 1986 song by Boom Crash Opera
- "The Great Wall", a 1986 song by the Dead Kennedys from Bedtime for Democracy
- "The Great Wall", a 2001 song by Sloan from Pretty Together
- "The Great Wall of China", a 1993 song by Billy Joel from River of Dreams

== Other uses ==
- Great Wall Marathon, a marathon held by and on the Great Wall
- Great Firewall of China, the media censorship policy in place in China

== See also ==
- Border wall
- Chinese wall (disambiguation)
- Grand Wall (or Stawamus Chief Mountain), in Squamish, British Columbia, Canada
- Green Wall of China, a planned forest designed to hold back the Gobi Desert
- Hadrian's Wall, built by Romans in Britain
- Long Wall (disambiguation)
- Volcanic dike wall, Spanish Peaks in La Veta, Colorado, United States
