= Cosmological principle =

Theory that the universe is the same in all directions

In modern physical cosmology, the cosmological principle is the notion that the spatial distribution of matter in the universe is uniformly isotropic and homogeneous when viewed on a large enough scale, since the forces are expected to act equally throughout the universe on a large scale, and should, therefore, produce no observable inequalities in the large-scale structuring over the course of evolution of the matter field that was initially laid down by the Big Bang.

== Definition ==
Astronomer William Keel explains:

The cosmological principle is usually stated formally as 'Viewed on a sufficiently large scale, the properties of the universe are the same for all observers.'

As Andrew Liddle puts it, "the cosmological principle [means that] the universe looks the same whoever and wherever you are."

The two testable structural consequences of the cosmological principle are homogeneity and isotropy. Homogeneity – constant density – means that the same observational evidence is available to observers at different locations in the universe. Isotropy – looking the same in all directions – means that the same observational evidence is available by looking in any direction in the universe. Isotropy implies homogeneity, but a homogeneous universe could be anisotropic.

== History ==
The term "cosmological principle" was first used by Edward Arthur Milne in the early 1930s. He viewed as an axiom or assumption, but considered it necessary for any sensible theory of the universe. Later work attempted to show that general relativity predicts homogeneity but eventually scientists concluded it did not.

== Observations ==
Unsolved problem in physics
Is the universe homogeneous and isotropic at large enough scales, as claimed by the cosmological principle and assumed by all models that use the Friedmann–Lemaître–Robertson–Walker metric, including the current version of the ΛCDM model, or is the universe inhomogeneous or anisotropic?
More unsolved problems in physics

Although the universe is inhomogeneous at smaller scales, according to the ΛCDM model it ought to be isotropic and statistically homogeneous on scales larger than 250 million light years. However, recent findings (the Axis of Evil for example) have suggested that violations of the cosmological principle exist in the universe and thus have called the ΛCDM model into question, with some authors suggesting that the cosmological principle is now obsolete and the Friedmann–Lemaître–Robertson–Walker metric breaks down in the late universe.

=== Violations of isotropy ===
The cosmic microwave background (CMB) is predicted by the ΛCDM model to be isotropic, that is to say that its intensity is about the same whichever direction we look at. Data from the Planck Mission shows hemispheric bias in two respects: one with respect to average temperature (i.e. temperature fluctuations), the second with respect to larger variations in the degree of perturbations (i.e. densities). The collaboration noted that these features are not strongly statistically inconsistent with isotropy. Some authors say that the universe around Earth is isotropic at high significance by studies of the cosmic microwave background temperature maps. There are however claims of isotropy violations from galaxy clusters, quasars, and type Ia supernovae.

=== Violations of homogeneity ===
The cosmological principle implies that at a sufficiently large scale, the universe is homogeneous. Based on N-body simulations in a ΛCDM universe, Jaswant Yadav and his colleagues showed that the spatial distribution of galaxies is statistically homogeneous if averaged over scales of 260/h Mpc or more.

A number of observations have been reported to be in conflict with predictions of maximal structure sizes:

- The Clowes–Campusano LQG, discovered in 1991, has a length of 580 Mpc, and is marginally larger than the consistent scale.
- The Sloan Great Wall, discovered in 2003, has a length of 423 Mpc, which is just barely consistent with the cosmological principle.
- U1.11, a large quasar group discovered in 2011, has a length of 780 Mpc, two times larger than the upper limit of the homogeneity scale.
- The Huge-LQG, discovered in 2012, is three times longer and two times wider than is predicted to be possible by current models.
- In November 2013, a new structure 10 billion light years away measuring 2000–3000 Mpc (more than seven times that of the Sloan Great Wall) was discovered, the Hercules–Corona Borealis Great Wall, putting further doubt on the validity of the cosmological principle.
- In September 2020, a 4.9σ conflict was found between the kinematic explanation of the CMB dipole and the measurement of the dipole in the angular distribution of a flux-limited, all-sky sample of 1.36 million quasars.
- In June 2021, the Giant Arc was discovered, a structure spanning approximately 1000 Mpc. It is located 2820 Mpc away and consists of galaxies, galactic clusters, gas, and dust.
- In January 2024, the Big Ring was discovered. It is located 9.2 billion light years away from Earth and has a diameter of 1.3 billion light years, giving it an angular size of 15 full moons as seen from Earth.

However, as pointed out by Seshadri Nadathur in 2013 using statistical properties, the existence of structures larger than the homogeneous scale (260/h Mpc by Yadav's estimation) does not necessarily violate the cosmological principle in the ΛCDM model (see Huge-LQG § Dispute).

== CMB dipole ==
Unsolved problem in physics
Is the CMB dipole purely kinematic, or does it signal anisotropy of the universe, resulting in the breakdown of the FLRW metric and the cosmological principle?
More unsolved problems in physics

The cosmic microwave background (CMB) provides a snapshot of a largely isotropic and homogeneous universe. The largest-scale feature of the CMB is the dipole anisotropy; it is typically subtracted from maps due to its large amplitude. The standard interpretation of the dipole is that it is kinematic, due to the Doppler effect caused by the motion of the solar system with respect to the CMB rest-frame.

Several studies have reported dipoles in the large-scale distribution of galaxies that align with the CMB dipole direction but that indicate a larger amplitude than would be caused by the CMB dipole velocity. A similar dipole is seen in data of radio galaxies; however, the amplitude of the dipole depends on the observing frequency, showing that these anomalous features cannot be purely kinematic. Other authors have found radio dipoles consistent with the CMB expectation. Further claims of anisotropy along the CMB dipole axis have been made with respect to the Hubble diagram of Type Ia supernovae and quasars. Separately, the CMB dipole direction has emerged as a preferred direction in some studies of alignments in quasar polarizations and strong lensing time delay, and in Type Ia supernovae and other standard candles. Some authors have argued that the correlation of distant effects with the dipole direction may indicate that its origin is not kinematic.

Alternatively, Planck data has been used to estimate the velocity with respect to the CMB independently of the dipole, by measuring the subtle aberrations and distortions of fluctuations caused by relativistic beaming and separately using the Sunyaev–Zeldovich effect. These studies found a velocity consistent with the value obtained from the dipole, indicating that it is consistent with being entirely kinematic. Measurements of the velocity field of galaxies in the local universe show that on short scales galaxies are moving with the Local Group, and that the average mean velocity decreases with increasing distance. This follows the expectation if the CMB dipole were due to the local peculiar velocity field, it becomes more homogeneous on large scales. Surveys of the local volume have been used to reveal a low-density region in the opposite direction to the CMB dipole, potentially explaining the origin of the local bulk flow.

== Implications ==
Since the 1990s, observations assuming the cosmological principle have concluded that around 68% of the mass–energy density of the universe can be attributed to dark energy, which led to the development of the ΛCDM model.

Observations show that more distant galaxies are closer together and have lower content of chemical elements heavier than lithium. Applying the cosmological principle, this suggests that heavier elements were not created in the Big Bang but were produced by nucleosynthesis in giant stars and expelled via a series of supernovae and new star formation from the supernova remnants, which means heavier elements would accumulate over time. Another observation is that the farthest galaxies (earlier time) are often more fragmentary, interacting and unusually shaped than local galaxies (recent time), suggesting evolution in galaxy structure as well.

A related implication of the cosmological principle is that the largest discrete structures in the universe should be in mechanical equilibrium. Homogeneity and isotropy of matter at the largest scales would suggest that the largest discrete structures are parts of a single non-discrete form, like the crumbs which make up the interior of a cake. At extreme cosmological distances, the property of mechanical equilibrium in surfaces lateral to the line of sight can be empirically tested; however, under the assumption of the cosmological principle, it cannot be detected parallel to the line of sight (see timeline of the universe).

Cosmologists agree that in accordance with observations of distant galaxies, a universe must be non-static if it follows the cosmological principle. In 1923, Alexander Friedmann set out a variant of Albert Einstein's equations of general relativity that describe the dynamics of a homogeneous isotropic universe. Independently, Georges Lemaître derived in 1927 the equations of an expanding universe from the General Relativity equations. Thus, a non-static universe is also implied, independent of observations of distant galaxies, as a result of applying the cosmological principle to general relativity.

== Criticism ==
Karl Popper criticized the cosmological principle on the grounds that it makes "our lack of knowledge a principle of knowing something". He summarized his position as:

"The 'cosmological principles' were, I fear, dogmas that should not have been proposed."

== Perfect cosmological principle ==
The perfect cosmological principle is an extension of the cosmological principle, and states that the universe is homogeneous and isotropic in space and time. In this view the universe looks not only the same everywhere in space (on large scales), but also the same as it always has and always will. The perfect cosmological principle underpins steady state theory and emerges from chaotic inflation theory.

== See also ==
- Background independence
- Copernican principle
- Cosmic variance
- End of Greatness
- Friedmann–Lemaître–Robertson–Walker metric
- Large-scale structure of the cosmos
- Expansion of the universe
- Redshift
- Local (astronomy)
