= South Pole Wall =

Massive cosmic structure

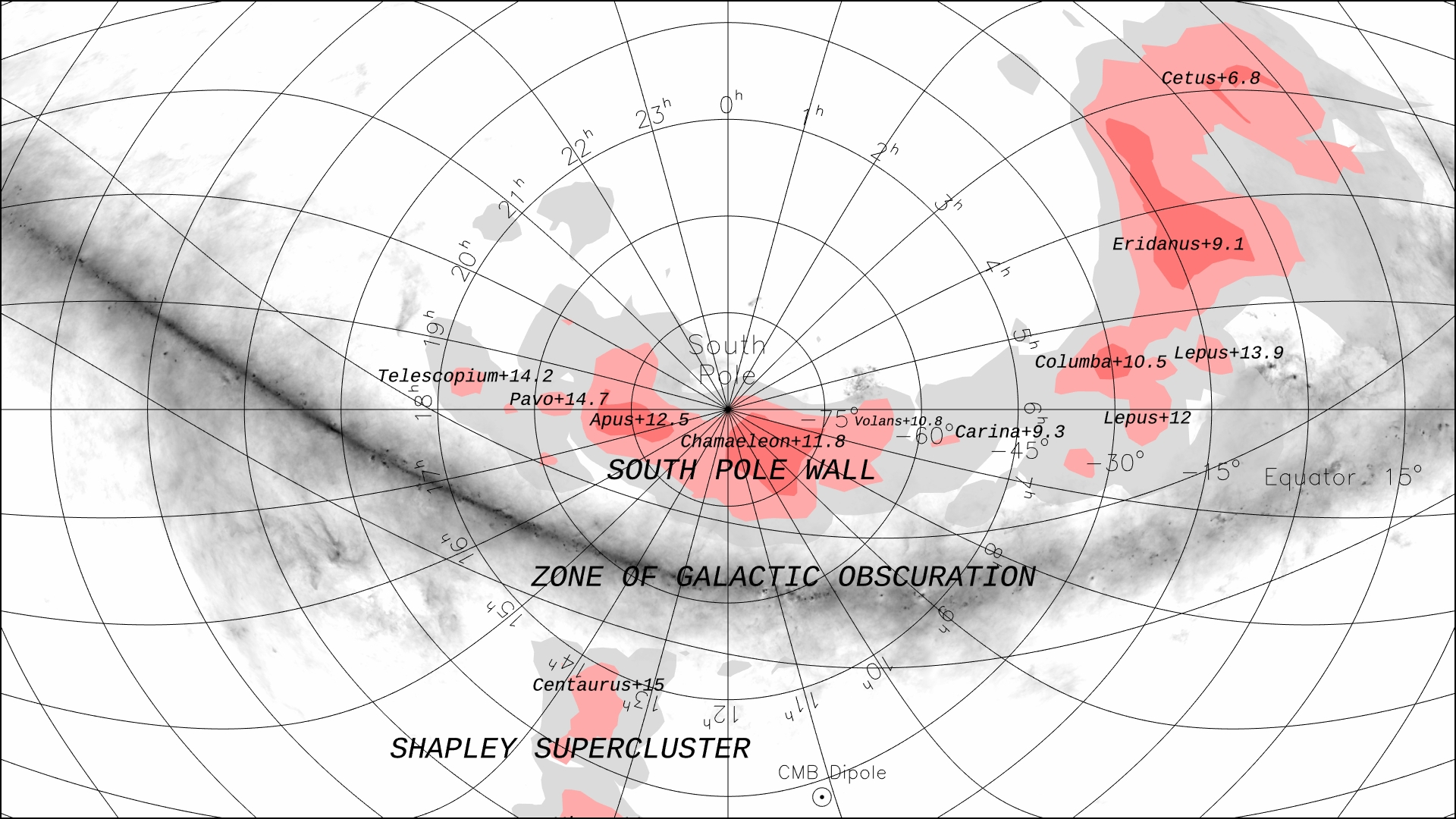
A projection of the South Pole Wall in celestial coordinates

The South Pole Wall (SPW or The South Pole Wall) is a massive cosmic structure formed by a giant wall of galaxies (a galaxy filament) that extends across at least 1.37 billion light-years of space, the nearest light (and consequently part) (Note: Currently preferred models of cosmic expansion would place the nearest parts of this superstructure at a few percentage points beyond the extrapolated age of its light based on its redshift, however lower probability models compete in which expansion may currently be proceeding greater, less or more non-uniformly than the central model predicts (rooted in the slighter redshifts and hence average effect on radial velocities of more local objects). Particularly the extent of variability at greatest scales in their subsequent history can never be directly observed. This makes light years distance of the deepest sky objects highly speculative.) of which is aged about half a billion light-years. The structure, in its astronomical angle, is dense in five known places including one very near to the celestial South Pole and is, according to the international team of astronomers that discovered the South Pole Wall, "...the largest contiguous feature in the local volume and comparable to the Sloan Great Wall at half the distance ...". Its discovery was announced by Daniel Pomarède of Paris-Saclay University and R. Brent Tully and colleagues of the University of Hawaiʻi in July 2020. Pomarède explained, "One might wonder how such a large and not-so distant structure remained unnoticed. This is due to its location in a region of the sky that has not been completely surveyed, and where direct observations are hindered by foreground patches of galactic dust and clouds. We have found it thanks to its gravitational influence, imprinted in the velocities of a sample of galaxies".

== Size ==
The wall measures over 1.37 billion light-years in length, and spans a large zone 500 million light-years away. The massive structure, at least to a very small extent, is behind the Milky Way galaxy's Zone of Avoidance (or Zone of Galactic Obscuration). The filament curves from the constellation Perseus in the Northern Hemisphere to Telescopium in the far south, in between which, skirting – slightly – over the present south celestial pole itself. It is so large that it greatly affects the local expansion of the universe. According to astronomer Tully, "We wonder if the South Pole Wall is much bigger than what we see. What we have mapped stretches across the full domain of the region we have surveyed. We are early explorers of the cosmos, extending our maps into unknown territory." According to the astronomers who discovered it, "We will not be certain of its full extent, nor whether it is unusual, until we map the universe on a significantly grander scale."

== See also ==
- Big Ring
- BOSS Great Wall
- CMB cold spot
- The Giant Arc
- Giant Void
- Great Attractor
- Hercules–Corona Borealis Great Wall
- List of largest cosmic structures
