= Big Ring =

Ring-shaped large-scale structure near the constellation Boötes

- Object type: Large-scale structure of the Universe

Observation data (Epoch required)
- Constellation: Boötes
- Right ascension: required
- Declination: required
- Distance: 9,200,000,000 ly (2.8×10^{9} pc)

The Big Ring is a ring-shaped large-scale structure formed by galaxies and galaxy clusters near the constellation Boötes with a diameter of 1.3 billion light years, located 9.2 billion light years away. It was discovered in 2024 by Alexia Lopez, a PhD student at the University of Central Lancashire. In 2021, she discovered the Giant Arc, a similar structure located in the same region. It is a significant astronomical discovery, as it challenges the Cosmological Principle. Currently, there is no known cause for its formation within our current understanding of the universe. The Big Ring is the seventh large structure discovered that contradicts the understanding of smooth matter distribution across the largest scale of the universe.

== Characteristics ==
The Big Ring is composed of numerous galaxies and galaxy clusters that form a continuous, almost perfect ring-like pattern in space. With its diameter of 1.3 billion light years and a circumference of 4 billion light years, it is one of the largest known structures within the observable universe. The structure is made up of many galaxy clusters and galaxies of various types. Some regions of the ring are denser than others, indicating variations in the mass and number of galaxies present. It exceeds the theoretical size limit of cosmic formations, which is calculated to be 1.2 billion light-years. This was previously thought to be impossible, as there wasn't enough time for such a large structure to form.

== Discovery ==
The discovery of the Big Ring was announced on 10 January 2024 by PhD student Alexia Lopez from the University of Central Lancashire. It resulted from her ongoing research into large-scale structures of the universe using MgII (singly ionized magnesium) absorbers detected in quasar spectra from the Sloan Digital Sky Survey (SDSS). Lopez focused her attention on this region of the cosmos because of her previous work on the Giant Arc. Through examining absorption lines in the spectra of quasars, Lopez and her team were able to identify intervening Magnesium-II (MgII) absorption systems. These absorption lines, back-lit by distant quasars, revealed the presence of a massive, ring-like structure.

One theory suggested the structure to be related to Baryonic Acoustic Oscillations (BAOs), however, due to its large scale and non-spherical shape, it was incompatible with this theory. Other suggested explanations were Conformal Cyclic Cosmology or effects of speculative cosmic strings (which are filamentary ‘topological defects’ of great size) passing through. Despite these hypotheses, the exact cause of these two structures remains unknown.

== Significance ==
The discoveries of the Big Ring as well as the Giant Arc are significant as they challenge the Cosmological Principle, which asserts that the universe is homogeneous and isotropic on large scales. Currently, there is no theoretical model to account for the existence of the gigantic galactic formations. Lopez stated “Neither of these two ultra-large structures is easy to explain in our current understanding of the universe."

== See also ==
- BOSS Great Wall
- CfA2 Great Wall
- Galaxy filament
- Hercules–Corona Borealis Great Wall
- Huge-LQG
- List of largest cosmic structures
- Sloan Great Wall
- South Pole Wall
