= Coma Filament =

Galaxy filament

The Coma Filament is a galaxy filament. The filament contains the Coma Supercluster of galaxies and forms a part of the CfA2 Great Wall.

== See also ==
- Abell catalogue
- Large-scale structure of the universe
- Supercluster
