= Redshift survey =

Type of astronomical survey

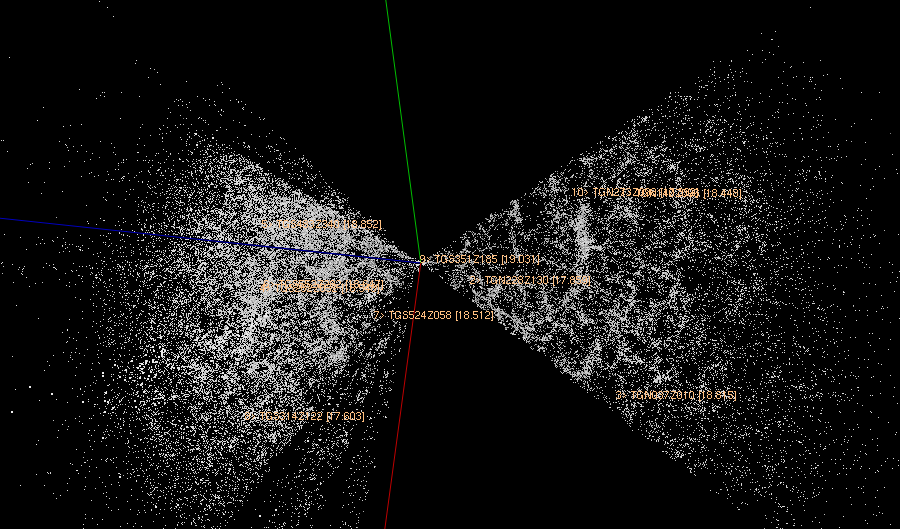
Rendering of the 2dFGRS data.

The positions in space of the galaxies identified by the VIPERS survey.

In astronomy, a redshift survey is a survey of a section of the sky to measure the redshift of astronomical objects: usually galaxies, but sometimes other objects such as galaxy clusters or quasars. Using Hubble's law, the redshift can be used to estimate the distance of an object from Earth. By combining redshift with angular position data, a redshift survey maps the 3D distribution of matter within a field of the sky. These observations are used to measure detailed statistical properties of the large-scale structure of the universe. In conjunction with observations of early structure in the cosmic microwave background, these results can place strong constraints on cosmological parameters such as the average matter density and the Hubble constant.

Generally the construction of a redshift survey involves two phases: first the selected area of the sky is imaged with a wide-field telescope, then galaxies brighter than a defined limit are selected from the resulting images as non-pointlike objects; optionally, colour selection may also be used to assist discrimination between stars and galaxies. Secondly, the selected galaxies are observed by spectroscopy, most commonly at visible wavelengths, to measure the wavelengths of prominent spectral lines; comparing observed and laboratory wavelengths then gives the redshift for each galaxy.

The Great Wall, a vast conglomeration of galaxies over 500 million light-years wide, provides a dramatic example of a large-scale structure that redshift surveys can detect.

The first systematic redshift survey was the CfA Redshift Survey of around 2,200 galaxies, started in 1977 with the initial data collection completed in 1982. This was later extended to the CfA2 redshift survey of 15,000 galaxies, completed in the early 1990s.

These early redshift surveys were limited in size by taking a spectrum for one galaxy at a time; from the 1990s, the development of fibre-optic spectrographs and multi-slit spectrographs enabled spectra for several hundred galaxies to be observed simultaneously, and much larger redshift surveys became feasible. Notable examples are the 2dF Galaxy Redshift Survey (221,000 redshifts, completed 2002); the Sloan Digital Sky Survey (approximately 1 million redshifts by 2007) and the Galaxy And Mass Assembly survey. Significant redshift surveys at the time were the DEEP2 Redshift Survey and the VIMOS-VLT Deep Survey (VVDS); these surveys had around 50,000 redshifts each, and were mainly focused on galaxy evolution. The Dark Energy Spectroscopic Instrument is currently the largest spectroscopic redshift survey reporting 47 million objects redshifts.

ZFOURGE or the FourStar Galaxy Evolution Survey is a large and deep medium-band imaging survey which aims to establish an observational benchmark of galaxy properties at redshift z > 1 for approximately 60,000 galaxies. The survey is using near-infrared FOURSTAR instrument on the Magellan Telescopes, surveying in all three HST legacy fields: COSMOS, CDFS, and UDS.

Because of the demands on observing time required to obtain spectroscopic redshifts (i.e., redshifts determined directly from spectral features measured at high precision), a common alternative is to use photometric redshifts based on model fits to the brightnesses and colors of objects. Such "photo-z's" can be used in large surveys to estimate the spatial distribution of galaxies and quasars, provided the galaxy types and colors are well understood in a particular redshift range. At present, the errors on photometric redshift measurements are significantly higher than those of spectroscopic redshifts, but future surveys (for example, the LSST) aim to significantly refine the technique.

== See also ==
- Baryon acoustic oscillations
- Intensity mapping
- Large-scale structure of the cosmos
- Redshift-space distortions
- Galaxy filament
