= H2356−309 =

Blazar

Observation data (Epoch )
- Constellation: Sculptor
- Right ascension: 23^{h} 59^{m} 0.7903^{s}
- Declination: −30° 37′ 40.67″
- Redshift: 0.1654
- Distance: 2 billion light-years

H2356−309 is a blazar (a type of active galactic nucleus) located behind the Sculptor Wall.

== Discovery ==
Using the Chandra X-ray Observatory and the XMM-Newton, scientists have detected a warm-hot intergalactic medium (WHIM) between galaxies in the Sculptor Wall. Scientists observed the absorption of a background light source in the warm-hot intergalactic medium. This background source is the blazar H2356−309.

== Application ==
Characteristics of this absorption in the Sculptor Wall by the oxygen atoms in particular are similar to the absorption of the oxygen atoms in warm-hot intergalactic medium, giving scientists more assurance they can find other sources that compare to warm-hot intergalactic medium. There are also similarities in the predicted temperature and density of the warm-hot intergalactic medium compared to the Sculptor Wall.
