= Chinese wall (disambiguation) =

A Chinese wall is an information barrier protocol established within an organization to prohibit exchanges of information between persons whose interaction might produce conflicts of interest. The term may also refer to:

== In China ==
- The Great Wall of China, massive series of fortifications in northern China built to defend against nomadic peoples living to the north of the wall.
- Chinese city wall, defensive systems used to protect towns and cities in China in pre-modern times
- Underground Great Wall of China
- Great Wall of Sand
- Great Green Wall of China

== In geography ==
- Chinese Wall (Idaho), a peak in the White Cloud Mountains, Idaho
- Chinese Wall (Montana), a 1,000 foot high, 15-mile long escarpment along the Continental Divide in the Bob Marshall Wilderness, Montana
- Chinese Wall, a former stone viaduct and barrier on the site of the current Penn Center, Philadelphia

== In media and entertainment ==
- The Chinese Wall, a play by Max Frisch
- Chinese Wall (album), the 1984 album by Philip Bailey
- "Chinese Wall" (Mad Men), the eleventh episode of the fourth season of the television series Mad Men

== In computing and security ==
- Brewer and Nash model, a multi-lateral computer security policy
- Golden Shield Project, also called National Public Security Work Informational Project, China's project for censorship and surveillance
- Great Firewall, a nickname for restrictions on internet access in China
- Chinese room, an argument for the existence of limitations on artificial intelligence systems

== Other ==
- Chinese architecture for walls in Chinese buildings
- Chinese drywall, a building material known for causing health problems between 2001 and 2009
- Wall (Chinese constellation), in Chinese astrology, one of the northern mansions of the Black Tortoise
- A German tag game from the 19th century; see British Bulldog (game) § Chinese wall

== See also ==
- Great Wall (disambiguation)
- Long Wall (disambiguation)
