= NGC 4333 =

Barred spiral galaxy in the constellation Virgo

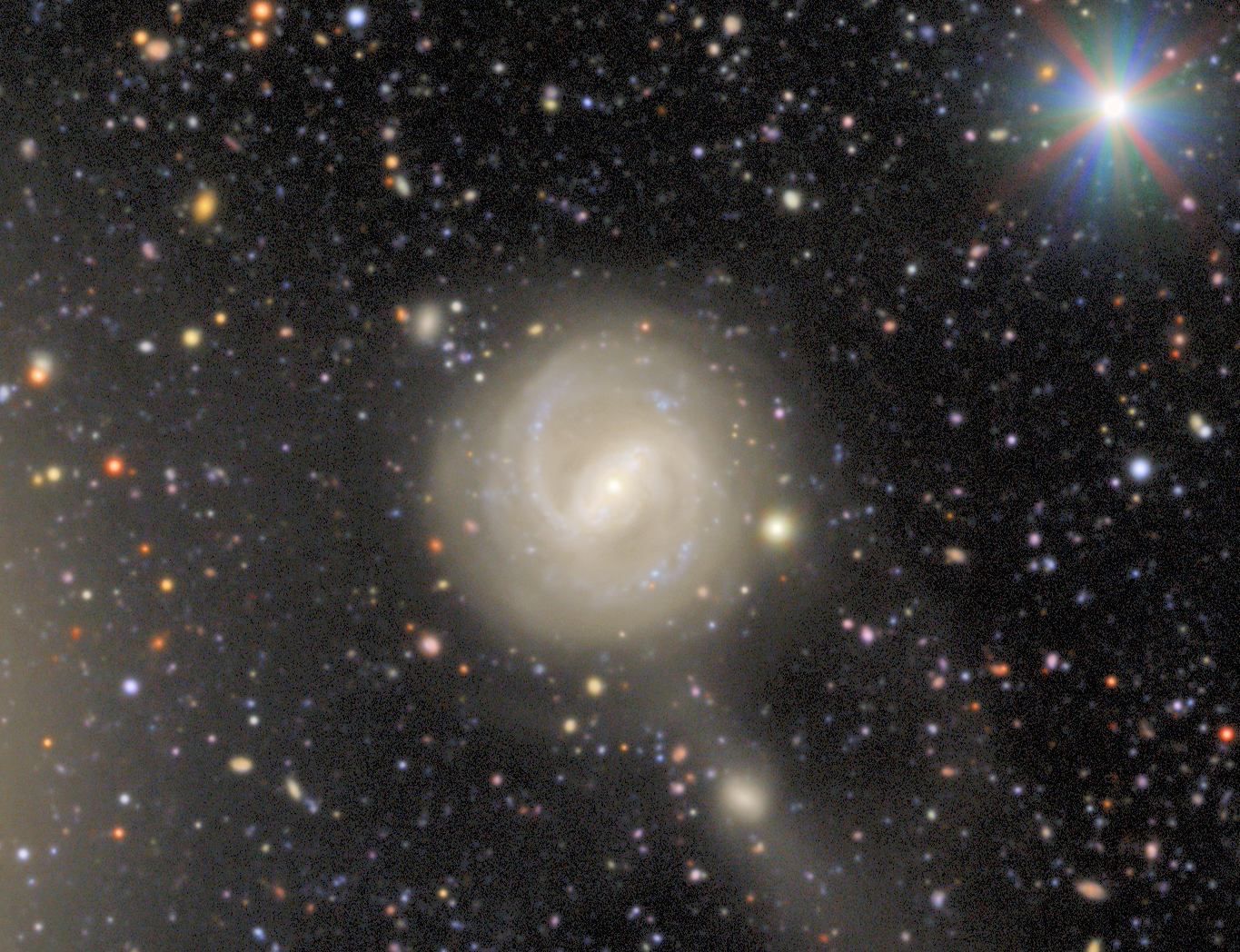
- NGC 4333 imaged by the Vera C. Rubin Observatory

Observation data (J2000 epoch)
- Constellation: Virgo
- Right ascension: 12^{h} 23^{m} 22.3^{s}
- Declination: 06° 02′ 27″
- Redshift: 0.023406
- Heliocentric radial velocity: 7,017 km/s
- Distance: 330 Mly (100 Mpc)
- Apparent magnitude (V): 14.48

Characteristics
- Type: SB(s)ab
- Size: ~110,800 ly (33.96 kpc) (estimated)
- Apparent size (V): 0.9 x 0.7

Other designations
- VCC 0637, PGC 040217, MCG +01-32-034, CGCG 042-065

NGC 4333 is a barred spiral galaxy with a ring structure located about 330 million light-years away in the constellation Virgo. It was discovered by astronomer William Herschel on April 13, 1784, who described it as "F, pS, R, bM, 2nd of 3". NGC 4333 is also classified as a LINER galaxy. Despite being listed in the Virgo Cluster catalog as VCC 637, it is not a member of the Virgo Cluster but instead a background galaxy.

== Nearby galaxies ==
NGC 4333 forms a pair with the galaxy NGC 4326, known as [T2015] nest 102514, in which NGC 4326 is the brightest member of the pair. Both galaxies are part of the CfA2 Great Wall.

== See also ==
- List of NGC objects (4001–5000)
