= NGC 4326 =

Barred spiral galaxy in the constellation of Virgo

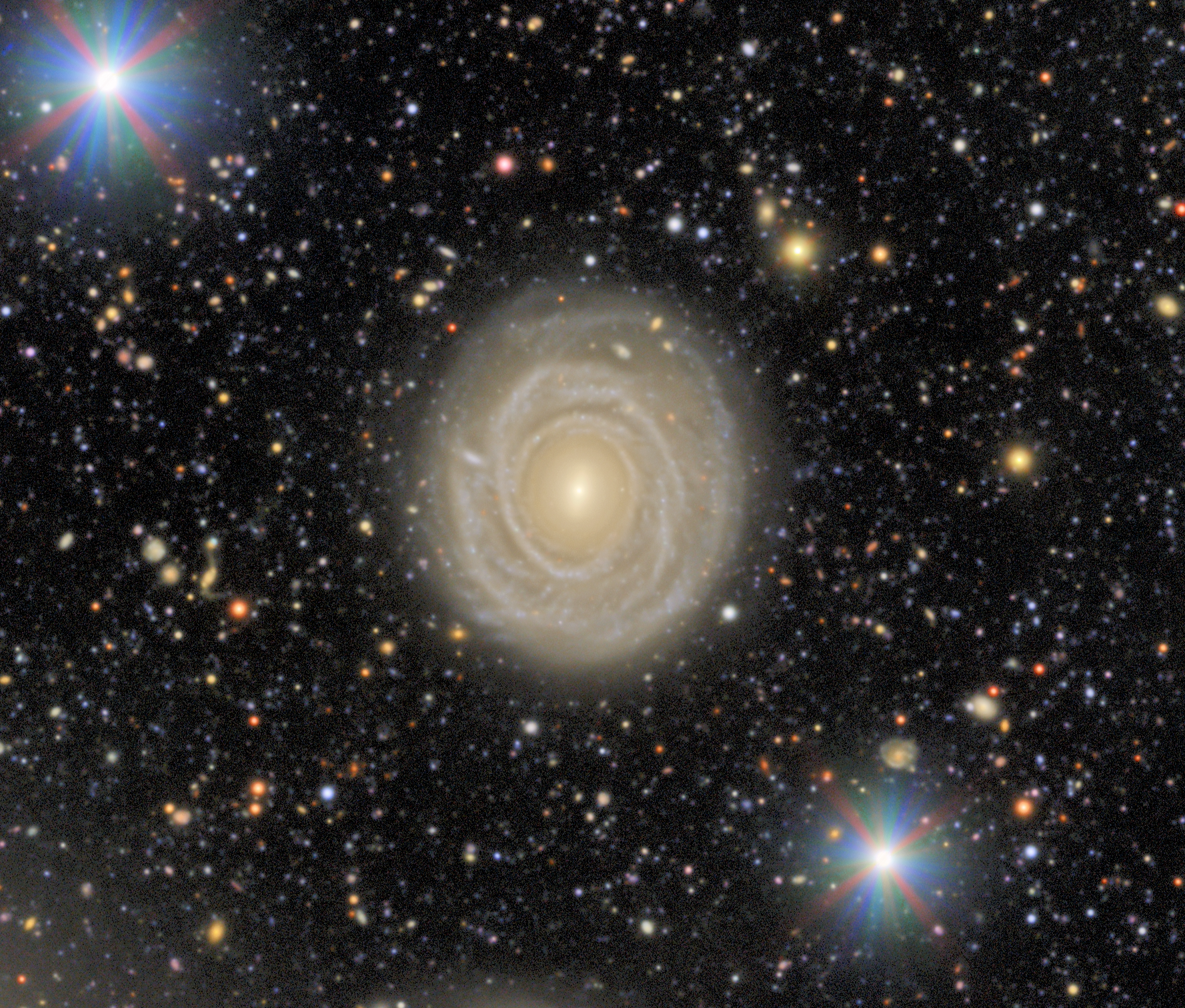
- NGC 4326 imaged by the Vera C. Rubin Observatory

Observation data (J2000 epoch)
- Constellation: Virgo
- Right ascension: 12^{h} 23^{m} 11.6^{s}
- Declination: 06° 04′ 20″
- Redshift: 0.023756
- Heliocentric radial velocity: 7122 km/s
- Distance: 330 Mly (102 Mpc)
- Apparent magnitude (V): 14.19

Characteristics
- Type: SAB(r)ab+
- Size: ~200,700 ly (61.54 kpc) (estimated)
- Apparent size (V): 1.5 x 1.1

Other designations
- UGC 07454, VCC 0623, PGC 040192, MCG +01-32-033, CGCG 042-064

NGC 4326 is a barred spiral galaxy with a ring located about 330 million light-years away in the constellation Virgo. It was discovered by astronomer William Herschel on April 13, 1784, who described it as "vF, S, R, bM, 1st of 3". It is a large galaxy, with a diameter of around 200,000 ly (61 kpc) making it nearly twice the size of the Milky Way. NGC 4326 is also classified as a LINER galaxy. Despite being listed in the Virgo Cluster catalog as VCC 623, it is not a member of the Virgo Cluster but instead a background galaxy.

NGC 4326 is host to a supermassive black hole with and estimated mass of 3.7×10^{8} solar masses.

== Nearby Galaxies ==
NGC 4326 forms a pair with the galaxy NGC 4333, known as [T2015] nest 102514, in which NGC 4326 is the brightest member of the pair. Both galaxies are part of the CfA2 Great Wall.

== See also ==
- List of NGC objects (4001–5000)
