= Grus Wall =

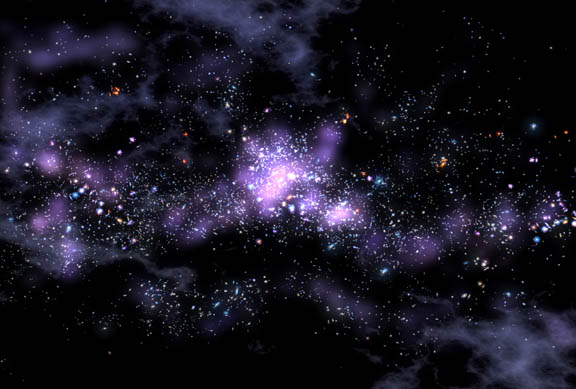
Artist's interpretation

The Grus Wall is a superstructure of galaxies ("wall of galaxies") formed in the early universe, named for the constellation Grus in which it is found ("grus" is Latin for "crane"). It has an average redshift of z=2.38 and lies about 10.8 billion light-years away. The Wall is around 300 million light-years long, comparable in size to the Sloan Great Wall. The Wall is "perpendicular" to the Fornax Wall and Sculptor Wall.

The Grus Wall was discovered in 2003 by Povilas Palunas, Paul Francis, Harry Teplitz, Gerard Williger, and Bruce E. Woodgate through the use of wide-field telescopes.
