= Ursa Major Filament =

Galaxy filament

Ursa Major Filament is a galaxy filament. The filament is connected to the CfA Homunculus, a portion of the filament forms a portion of the "leg" of the Homunculus.

== See also ==
- Abell catalogue
- Large-scale structure of the universe
- Supercluster
