= Fornax Wall =

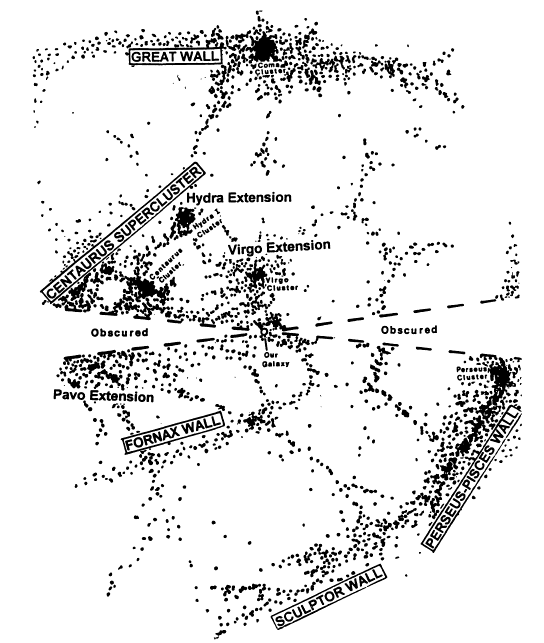
Distribution of galaxies showing the Fornax Wall and other superstructures in the Universe

The Fornax Wall is a superstructure known as a galaxy filament or galaxy wall. It is a long filament of galaxies with a major axis longer than its minor one. The filament contains not only Dorado Group but also the Fornax Cluster of galaxies, which lies at the same distance. It is "parallel" to the Sculptor Wall and "perpendicular" to the Grus Wall.
