= BOSS Great Wall =

One of the largest superstructures in the observable universe

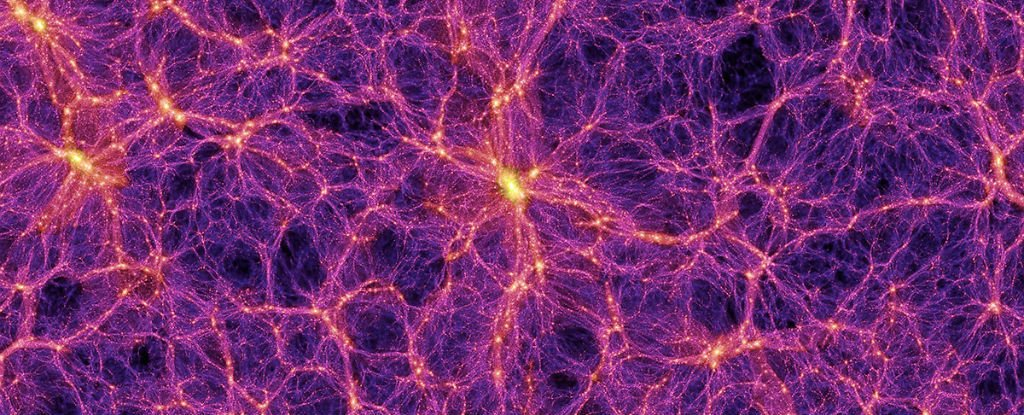
This graphic represents a large supercluster system, like the BOSS Great Wall, with its clusters, voids, and galaxy filaments.

The BOSS Great Wall is a supercluster complex that was identified, using the Baryon Oscillation Spectroscopic Survey (BOSS) of the Sloan Digital Sky Survey (SDSS), in early 2016. It was discovered by a research team from several institutions, consisting of: Heidi Lietzen, Elmo Tempel, Lauri Juhan Liivamägi, Antonio Montero-Dorta, Maret Einasto, Alina Streblyanska, Claudia Maraston, Jose Alberto Rubiño-Martín and Enn Saar. The BOSS Great Wall is one of the largest superstructures in the observable universe, though there are even larger structures known.

This figure shows the superclusters of the BOSS Great Wall, on Cartesian coordinates.

The large complex has a mean redshift of z ~ 0.47 (z times Hubble length ≈ 6.8 billion light years). It consists of two elongated superclusters, two large superclusters, and several smaller superclusters as well. The elongated superclusters form galaxy walls, with the larger of the two having a diameter of 186/h Mpc (supercluster A in the figure); the second wall's being 173/h Mpc (supercluster B). The other two main superclusters are moderately large, having diameters of 91/h Mpc and 64/h Mpc (superclusters D and C, respectively).

The superstructure is roughly 1 billion light years in diameter, and has a total mass approximately 10,000 times the Milky Way galaxy. It contains at least 830 visible galaxies (represented in the figure within their respective superclusters), as well as many others that are not visible (dark galaxies). The researchers used Minkowski functionals to verify the structure's overall shape and size; the first three quantifying the thickness, width, and length followed by the fourth determining the structure's overall curvature. The research team compared the luminosities and stellar masses within the superstructure to known high stellar mass galaxies within the SDSS's 7th data release, DR7. This allowed the team to scale the data using known values, from local superclusters, to determine the overall morphology of the BOSS Great Wall. It is currently debated amongst astronomers if the BOSS Great Wall may be considered a structure, due to the intricacies of its shape and overall size. The question of whether the supercluster complex is moving together or being slowly separated by the expanding universe is a key factor to this discussion. Nevertheless, when compared to several other chain structures, such as the Sloan Great Wall, the BOSS Great Wall's superclusters are far richer, containing more dense, high stellar mass galaxies. The BOSS Great Wall's discovery, and the data gained therein, should prove very beneficial for astronomers who study the overall structure of the cosmic web.

== See also ==
- Big Ring
- Giant Arc
