= Giant Arc =

Large-scale structure in the observable universe seen in 2021

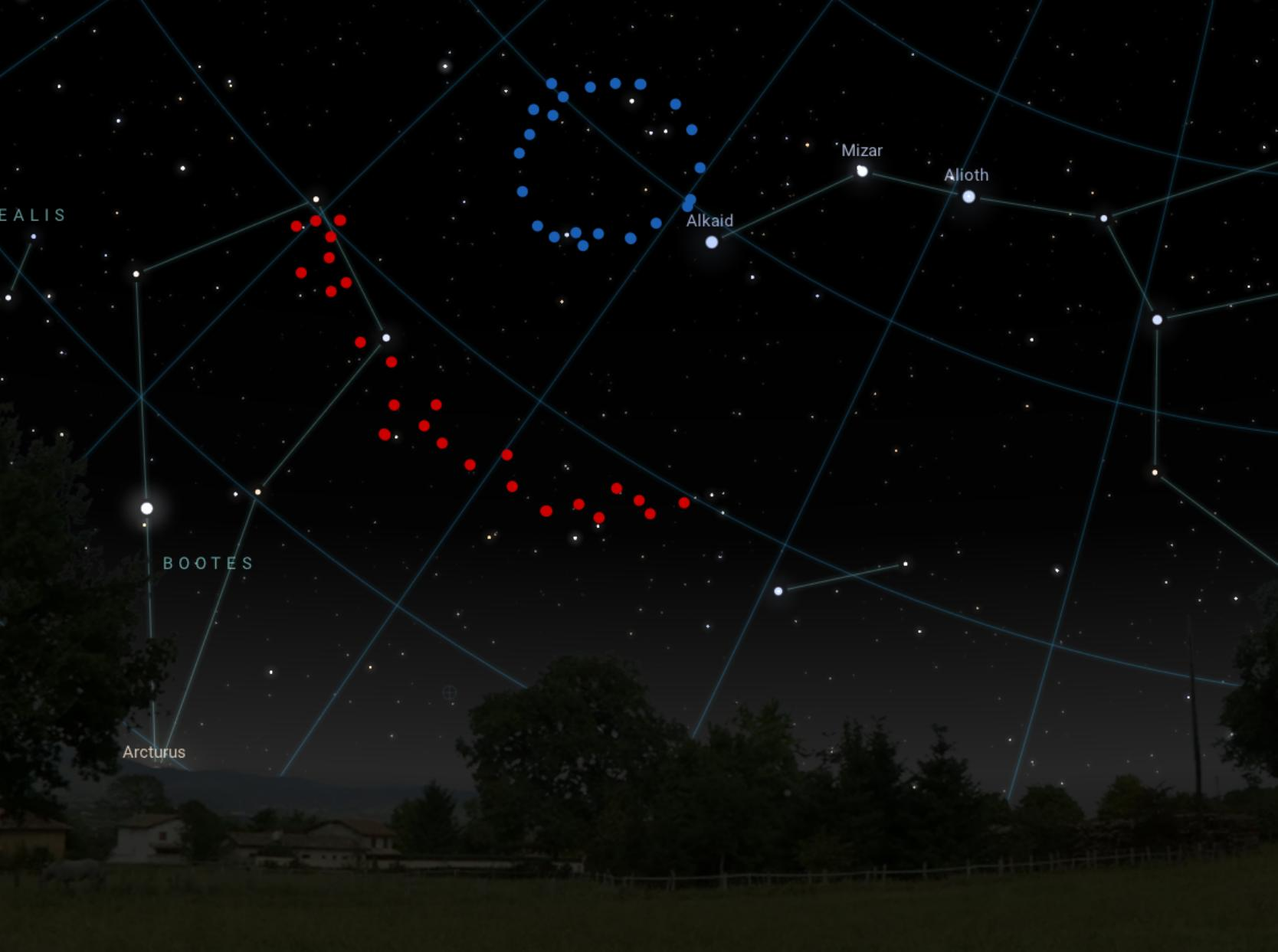
- Object type: Large-scale structure of the Universe, galaxy filament

Observation data (Epoch required)
- Constellation: Boötes
- Right ascension: required
- Declination: required
- Redshift: 0.8
- Distance: 9,300,000,000, 9,200,000,000 ly (5.9×10^{14}, 5.8×10^{14} AU)

The Giant Arc is a claimed large-scale structure discovered in June 2021 that spans 3.3 billion light years. This structure of galaxies exceeds the 1.2 billion light year size threshold of the currently accepted model of cosmology, potentially challenging the cosmological principle that at large enough scales the universe is considered to be the same everywhere (homogeneous) and in every direction (isotropic). The Giant Arc consists of galaxies and galactic clusters, as well as gas and dust. It is located 9.2 billion light-years away at redshift ~0.8, and it stretches across roughly 1/15th of the radius of the observable universe. It was discovered using data from the Sloan Digital Sky Survey by the team of Alexia M. Lopez, then a doctoral candidate, now a post-doctoral researcher in cosmology at the University of Central Lancashire.

The Giant Arc was discovered using a new method for finding large-scale structure by looking for intervening Mg II absorption lines in background quasars. It consists of two parts, GA-main (larger) and GA-sub (smaller), which appear visually linked but become distinct under algorithmic analysis.

It and the Big Ring, also discovered by Lopez, may be part of the same large-scale structure, with a galaxy filament potentially connecting the two structures.

In February 2025, a team led by Dr. Till Sawala from the University of Helsinki claimed to show that the existence of the Giant Arc does not contradict the cosmological principle, because similarly-sized structures were predicted in their cosmological simulations, as well as in random patterns.

If the Giant Arc were visible in the night sky it would form an arc occupying as much space as 20 full moons, or 10 degrees on the sky.

== See also ==
- BOSS Great Wall
- CfA2 Great Wall
- Hercules–Corona Borealis Great Wall
- Huge-LQG
- Sloan Great Wall
- South Pole Wall
