= DEEP2 Redshift Survey =

Astronomical survey

- Website: deep.ucolick.org

The DEEP2 Survey or DEEP2 was a two-phased redshift survey of galaxies at redshifts $z\sim 1$. It used the twin 10-metre Keck telescopes in Hawaii to measure the spectra and redshifts of approximately 50,000 galaxies. It was the first project to study galaxies in the distant universe with a spectral resolution similar to local surveys, such as the Sloan Digital Sky Survey. It was completed in 2013.
