= Large-scale structure of the universe =

Concept in cosmology

The large-scale structure of the universe is the term in cosmology for the character of matter distribution at the scale of the entire observable universe. Sky surveys and mappings of the various wavelength bands of electromagnetic radiation (in particular 21-cm emission) have yielded much information on the content and character of the universe's structure. The organization of structure appears to follow a hierarchical model with organization up to the scale of superclusters and filaments. Larger than this (at scales between 30 and 200 megaparsecs), there seems to be no continued structure, a phenomenon that has been referred to as the End of Greatness. The shape of the large scale structure can be summarized by the matter power spectrum.

== Cosmic Web: walls, filaments, nodes, and voids ==
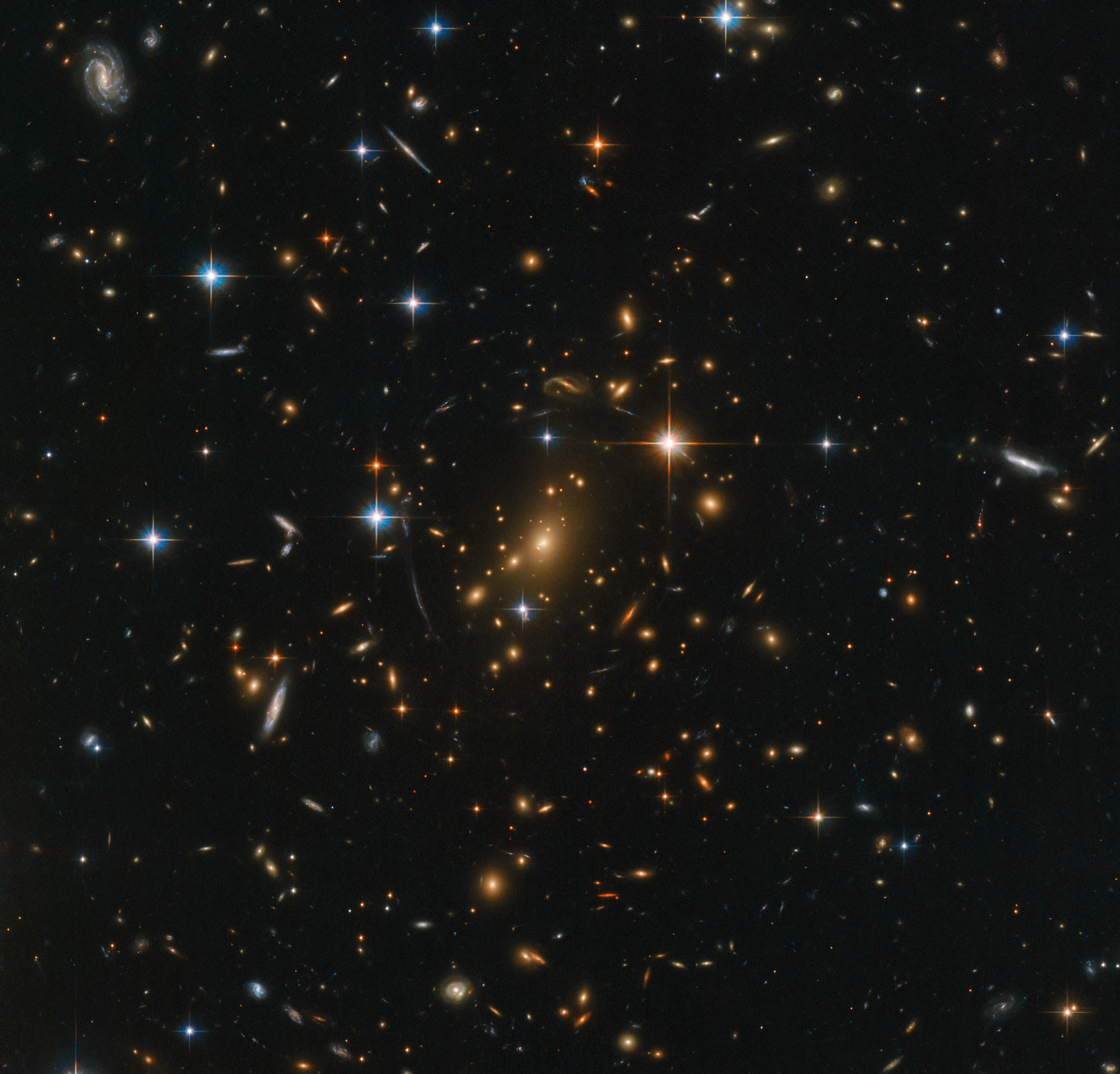
Galaxy clusters, like RXC J0142.9+4438, are the nodes of the cosmic web that permeates the entire Universe.

Video of a cosmological simulation of the local universe, showing the large-scale structure of galaxy clusters and dark matter.

The organization of structure arguably begins at the stellar level, though most cosmologists rarely address astrophysics on that scale. Stars are organized into galaxies, which in turn form galaxy groups, galaxy clusters, superclusters, sheets, walls and filaments, which are separated by immense voids, creating a vast foam-like structure sometimes called the "cosmic web". Prior to 1989, it was commonly assumed that virialized galaxy clusters were the largest structures in existence, and that they were distributed more or less uniformly throughout the universe in every direction. However, since the early 1980s, more and more structures have been discovered. In 1983, Adrian Webster identified the Webster LQG, a large quasar group consisting of 5 quasars. The discovery was the first identification of a large-scale structure, and has expanded the information about the known grouping of matter in the universe.

In 1987, Robert Brent Tully identified the Pisces–Cetus Supercluster Complex, the galaxy filament in which the Milky Way resides. It is about 1 billion light-years across. That same year, an unusually large region with a much lower than average distribution of galaxies was discovered, the Giant Void, which measures 1.3 billion light-years across. Based on redshift survey data, in 1989 Margaret Geller and John Huchra discovered the "Great Wall", a sheet of galaxies more than 500 million light-years long and 200 million light-years wide, but only 15 million light-years thick. The existence of this structure escaped notice for so long because it requires locating the position of galaxies in three dimensions, which involves combining location information about the galaxies with distance information from redshifts.

Two years later, astronomers Roger G. Clowes and Luis E. Campusano discovered the Clowes–Campusano LQG, a large quasar group measuring two billion light-years at its widest point, which was the largest known structure in the universe at the time of its announcement. In April 2003, another large-scale structure was discovered, the Sloan Great Wall. In August 2007, a possible supervoid was detected in the constellation Eridanus. It coincides with the 'CMB cold spot', a cold region in the microwave sky that is highly improbable under the currently favored cosmological model. This supervoid could cause the cold spot, but to do so it would have to be improbably big, possibly a billion light-years across, almost as big as the Giant Void mentioned above.

Unsolved problem in physics
The largest structures in the universe are larger than expected. Are these actual structures or random density fluctuations?
More unsolved problems in physics

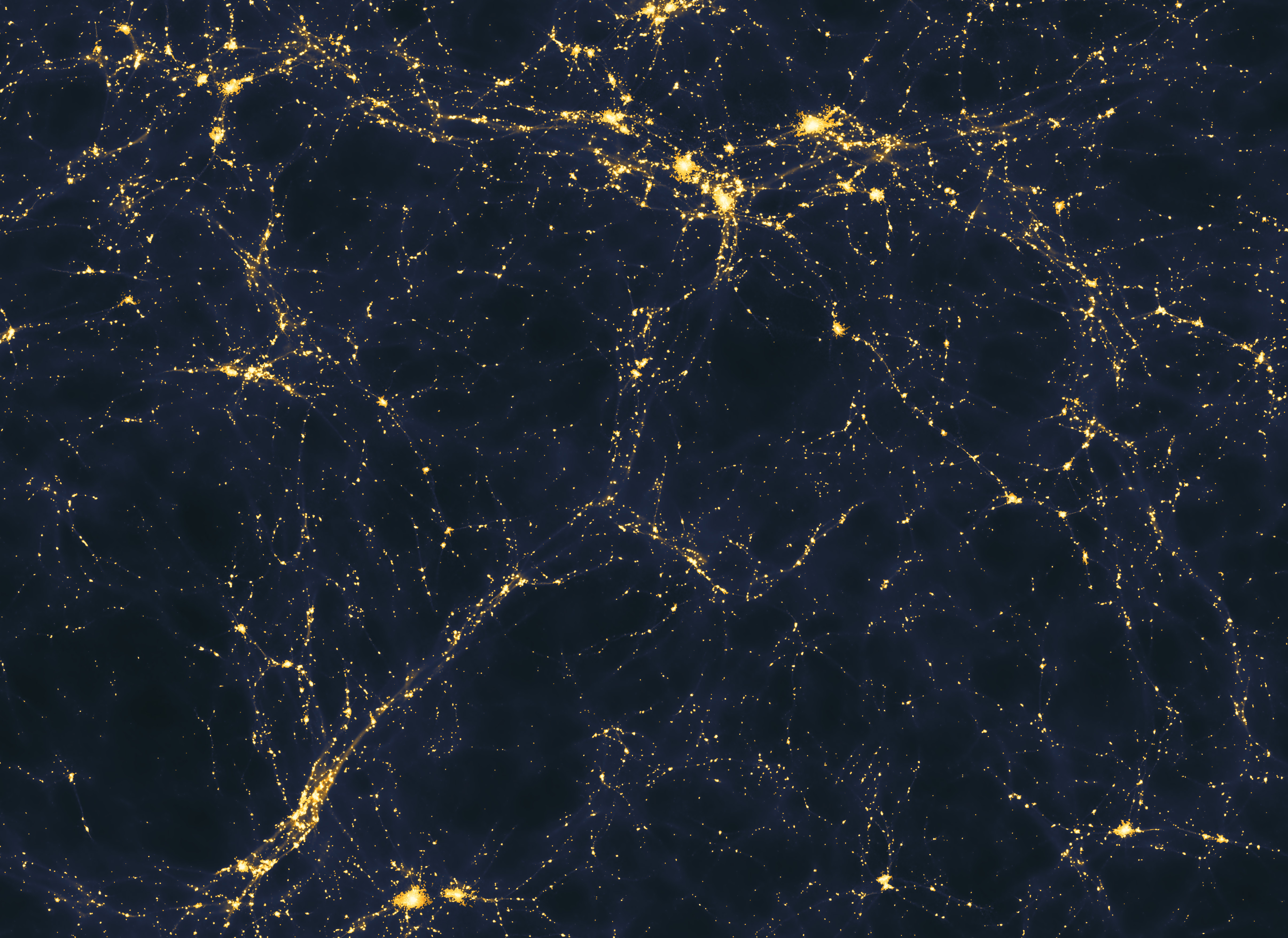
Computer simulated image of an area of space more than 50 million light-years across, presenting a possible large-scale distribution of light sources in the universe—precise relative contributions of galaxies and quasars are unclear.

Another large-scale structure is the SSA22 Protocluster, a collection of galaxies and enormous gas bubbles that measures about 200 million light-years across.

In 2011, a large quasar group was discovered, U1.11, measuring about 2.5 billion light-years across. On January 11, 2013, another large quasar group, the Huge-LQG, was discovered, which was measured to be four billion light-years across, the largest known structure in the universe at that time. In November 2013, astronomers discovered the Hercules–Corona Borealis Great Wall, an even bigger structure twice as large as the former. It was defined by the mapping of gamma-ray bursts.

In 2021, the American Astronomical Society announced the detection of the Giant Arc; a crescent-shaped string of galaxies that span 3.3 billion light years in length, located 9.2 billion light years from Earth in the constellation Boötes from observations captured by the Sloan Digital Sky Survey.

== End of Greatness ==
The End of Greatness is the name occasionally given to an observational scale around 100 Mpc (roughly 300 million light-years) where the lumpiness seen in the large-scale structure of the universe is homogenized and isotropized in accordance with the cosmological principle. The "lumpiness" is quantified by computing a fractal dimension from observations. The superclusters and filaments seen in smaller surveys are randomized to the extent that the smooth distribution of the universe is visually apparent. It was not until the redshift surveys of the 1990s were completed that this scale could accurately be observed.

== Observations ==
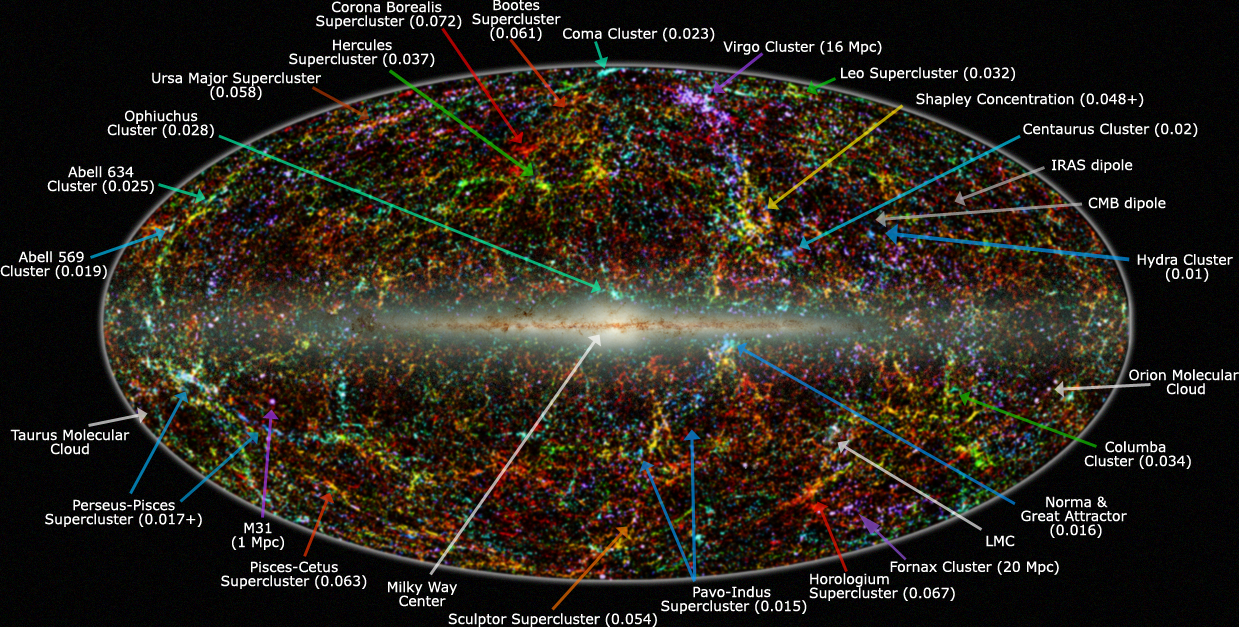
"Panoramic view of the entire near-infrared sky reveals the distribution of galaxies beyond the Milky Way. The image is derived from the 2MASS Extended Source Catalog (XSC)—more than 1.5 million galaxies, and the Point Source Catalog (PSC)—nearly 0.5 billion Milky Way stars. The galaxies are color-coded by 'redshift' obtained from the UGC, CfA, Tully NBGC, LCRS, 2dF, 6dFGS, and SDSS surveys (and from various observations compiled by the NASA Extragalactic Database), or photo-metrically deduced from the K band (2.2 μm). Blue are the nearest sources (z < 0.01); green are at moderate distances (0.01 < z < 0.04) and red are the most distant sources that 2MASS resolves (0.04 < z < 0.1). The map is projected with an equal area Aitoff in the Galactic system (Milky Way at center)."

Another indicator of large-scale structure is the 'Lyman-alpha forest'. This is a collection of absorption lines that appear in the spectra of light from quasars, which are interpreted as indicating the existence of huge thin sheets of intergalactic (mostly hydrogen) gas. These sheets appear to collapse into filaments, which can feed galaxies as they grow where filaments either cross or are dense. An early direct evidence for this cosmic web of gas was the 2019 detection, by astronomers from the RIKEN Cluster for Pioneering Research in Japan and Durham University in the United Kingdom, of light from the brightest part of this web, surrounding and illuminated by a cluster of forming galaxies, acting as cosmic flashlights for intercluster medium hydrogen fluorescence via Lyman-alpha emissions.

In 2021, an international team, headed by Roland Bacon from the Centre de Recherche Astrophysique de Lyon (France), reported the first observation of diffuse extended Lyman-alpha emission from redshift 3.1 to 4.5 that traced several cosmic web filaments on scales of 2.5−4 cMpc (comoving mega-parsecs), in filamentary environments outside massive structures typical of web nodes.

Some caution is required in describing structures on a cosmic scale because they are often different from how they appear. Gravitational lensing can make an image appear to originate in a different direction from its real source, when foreground objects curve surrounding spacetime (as predicted by general relativity) and deflect passing light rays. Rather usefully, strong gravitational lensing can sometimes magnify distant galaxies, making them easier to detect. Weak lensing by the intervening universe in general also subtly changes the observed large-scale structure.

The large-scale structure of the universe also looks different if only redshift is used to measure distances to galaxies. For example, galaxies behind a galaxy cluster are attracted to it and fall towards it, and so are blueshifted (compared to how they would be if there were no cluster). On the near side, objects are redshifted. Thus, the environment of the cluster looks somewhat pinched if using redshifts to measure distance. The opposite effect is observed on galaxies already within a cluster: the galaxies have some random motion around the cluster center, and when these random motions are converted to redshifts, the cluster appears elongated. This creates a "finger of God"—the illusion of a long chain of galaxies pointed at Earth.

== Cosmography of Earth's cosmic neighborhood ==
At the centre of the Hydra–Centaurus Supercluster, a gravitational anomaly called the Great Attractor affects the motion of galaxies over a region hundreds of millions of light-years across. These galaxies are all redshifted, in accordance with Hubble's law. This indicates that they are receding from us and from each other, but the variations in their redshift are sufficient to reveal the existence of a concentration of mass equivalent to tens of thousands of galaxies.

The Great Attractor, discovered in 1986, lies at a distance of between 150 million and 250 million light-years in the direction of the constellations Hydra and Centaurus. In its vicinity there is a preponderance of large old galaxies, many of which are colliding with their neighbours, or radiating large amounts of radio waves.

In 1987, astronomer R. Brent Tully of the University of Hawaiʻi's Institute of Astronomy identified what he called the Pisces–Cetus Supercluster Complex, a structure one billion light-years long and 150 million light-years across in which, he claimed, the Local Supercluster is embedded.

== See also ==
- Local (astronomy)
