= Lynx–Ursa Major Filament =

Galaxy filament

Lynx–Ursa Major Filament (LUM Filament) is a galaxy filament. The filament is connected to and separate from the Lynx–Ursa Major Supercluster.
