= Sculptor Wall =

Galaxy filament in the constellation Sculptor

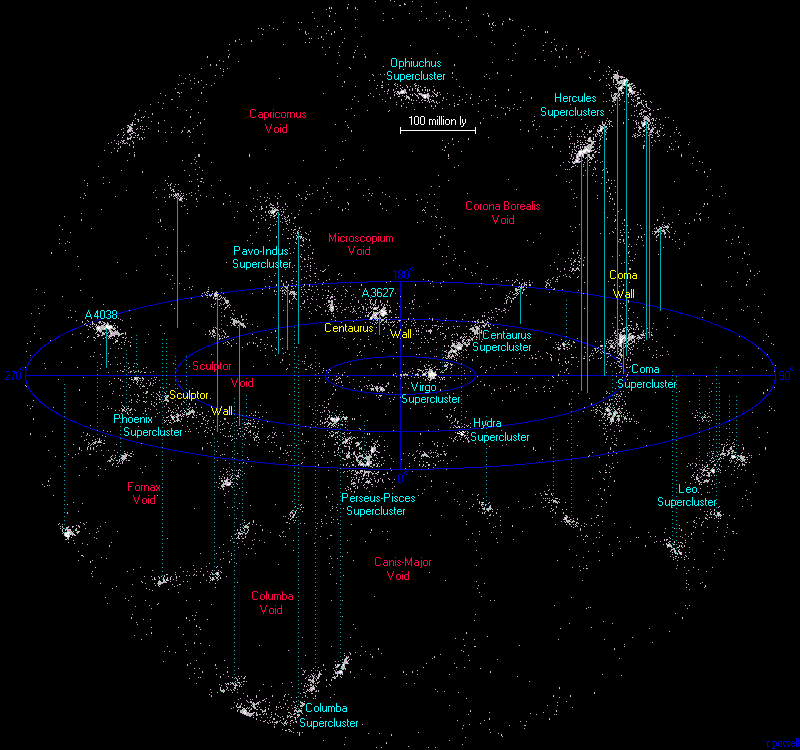
The local universe, including the Sculptor Wall

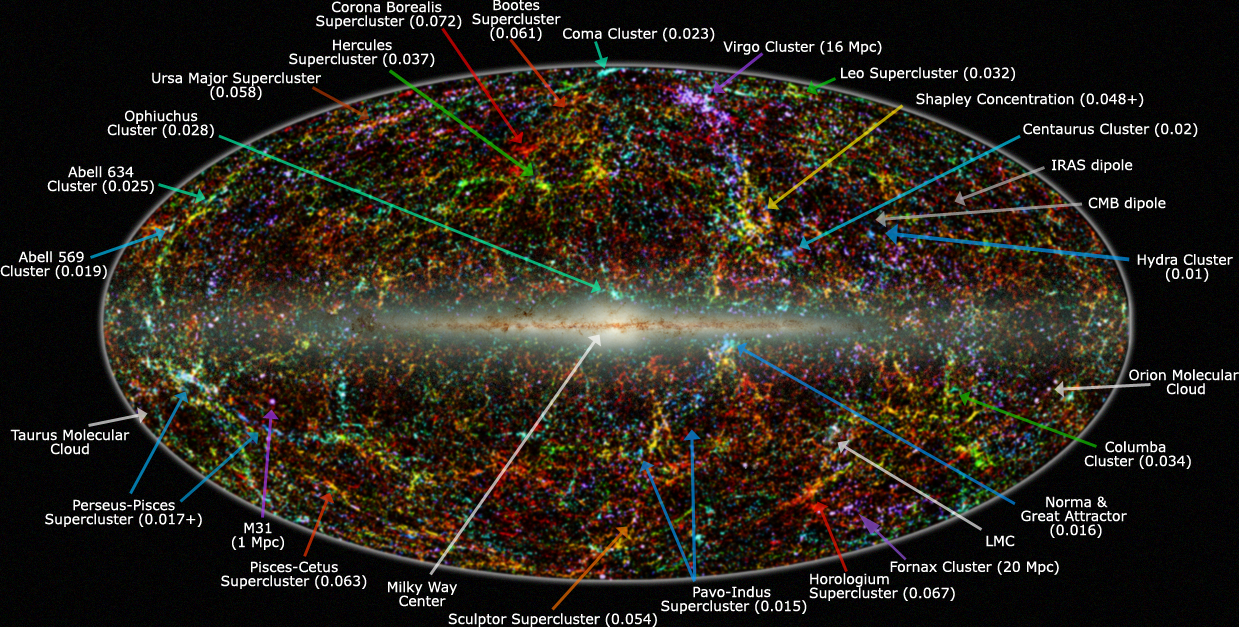
2MASS distance map of the local universe, including the primary Sculptor Supercluster

The Sculptor Wall, also called the Sculptor region, is a superstructure of galaxies ("wall of galaxies") relatively near to the Milky Way Galaxy (redshift of approximately z=0.03), also known as the Sculptor superclusters, Main Supercluster Catalogue (MSCC) 33 and Southern Supercluster Catalogue (SSCC) 36. It is considered to be part of the larger Pisces–Cetus Supercluster Complex, which contains the Virgo Supercluster, and hence the Laniakea.

The superstructure is also called the Southern Great Wall, the Great Southern Wall, or just the Southern Wall, in reference to the Northern Great Wall. The structure is 8000 km/s long (where km/s indicates the rate of expansion between two objects at the extents of a superstructure), 5000 km/s wide, 1000 km/s deep, in redshift space dimensions. Because these structures are so large, it is convenient to estimate their size by measuring their redshift; using a value of 67.8 for Hubble's constant, the size of the structure is approximately 100 Mpc long by 70 Mpc wide by 10 Mpc deep.

The Grus Wall is "perpendicular" to the Fornax Wall and Sculptor Wall.

== Members ==
The Sculptor superclusters (SCL 9) consists of approximately 25 members and 5 core members, which are Abell 42, 88, 118, 122, 2726, 2751, 2755, 2759, 2778, 2780, 2798, 2801, 2804, 2811, 2814, 2829, 2844, 2878, 3984, 3998, 4010, 4021, 4029, 4068, 4074. Hence, making it the third largest supercluster after the Horologium-Reticulum Supercluster (SCL 48), which contains approximately 35 galaxy clusters and Shapley Supercluster (SCL 124) which consists of 28 galaxy clusters. It shows that certain galaxy cluster members within Sculptor Superclusters are connected to another supercluster named MSCC 47.
