= Clowes–Campusano LQG =

Large quasar group consisting of 34 quasars

The Clowes–Campusano LQG (CCLQG; also called LQG 3 and U1.28) is a large quasar group, consisting of 34 quasars and measuring about 2 billion light-years across. It is one of the largest known superstructures in the observable universe. It is located near the larger Huge-LQG. It was discovered by the astronomers Roger Clowes and Luis Campusano in 1991.

== Characteristics ==
Lying at a distance of 9.5 billion light years away, the CCLQG is a cosmic decoupling of 34 individual quasars (highly luminous active galactic nuclei powered by supermassive black holes) spanning a region roughly 2 billion light-years in length, and about 1 billion light years wide, making it one of the largest and most exotic cosmic structures known in the observable universe. It was named U1.28 because of its average redshift of 1.28, and is located in the constellation of Leo. It was also notable because it is located in the ecliptic, the line where the Sun seems to travel in the entire year. It was 1.8 billion light-years away from the Huge-LQG, a group of 73 quasars discovered in 2012.

Its proximity to the Huge-LQG has attracted the attention of scientists. First, because it was very close to the Huge-LQG, the region where the two LQG's are located are different, or "lumpy", when compared to other regions in the universe with the same size and redshift. Second, because of their close locations, it has been suggested that the two structures are really a single structure in itself, and only connected by hidden intergalactic filament; however, no such evidence has been found.

== See also ==
- CfA2 Great Wall
- Galaxy filament
- Hercules–Corona Borealis Great Wall
- Large-scale structure of the cosmos
- List of largest cosmic structures
- Pisces–Cetus Supercluster Complex
- Sloan Great Wall
