= Lynx–Ursa Major Supercluster =

Lynx–Ursa Major Supercluster is a supercluster in the Lynx–Ursa Major Region. It was discovered by Giovanelli and Haynes in 1982. The supercluster is connected to Lynx–Ursa Major Filament.
