= Long Wall =

Long walls were ancient Greek defensive structures between cities and ports, especially the Long Walls linking Athens to Piraeus and Phalerum.

The Long Wall may also refer to:

- Anastasian Wall
- Long Wall on the Thracian Chersonese
- Long Wall of China, more commonly known as the Great Wall
- Long Wall of Korea, either of two great walls between Korea and China
- Long Wall of Vietnam, between northern and southern Vietnam
- Long Wall, an American aerospace company whose name is inspired by the Greek structures

== See also ==
- Longwall mining, an underground mining technique
- Grand Wall
- Great Wall (disambiguation)
