= RXC J0142.9+4438 =

Massive galaxy cluster

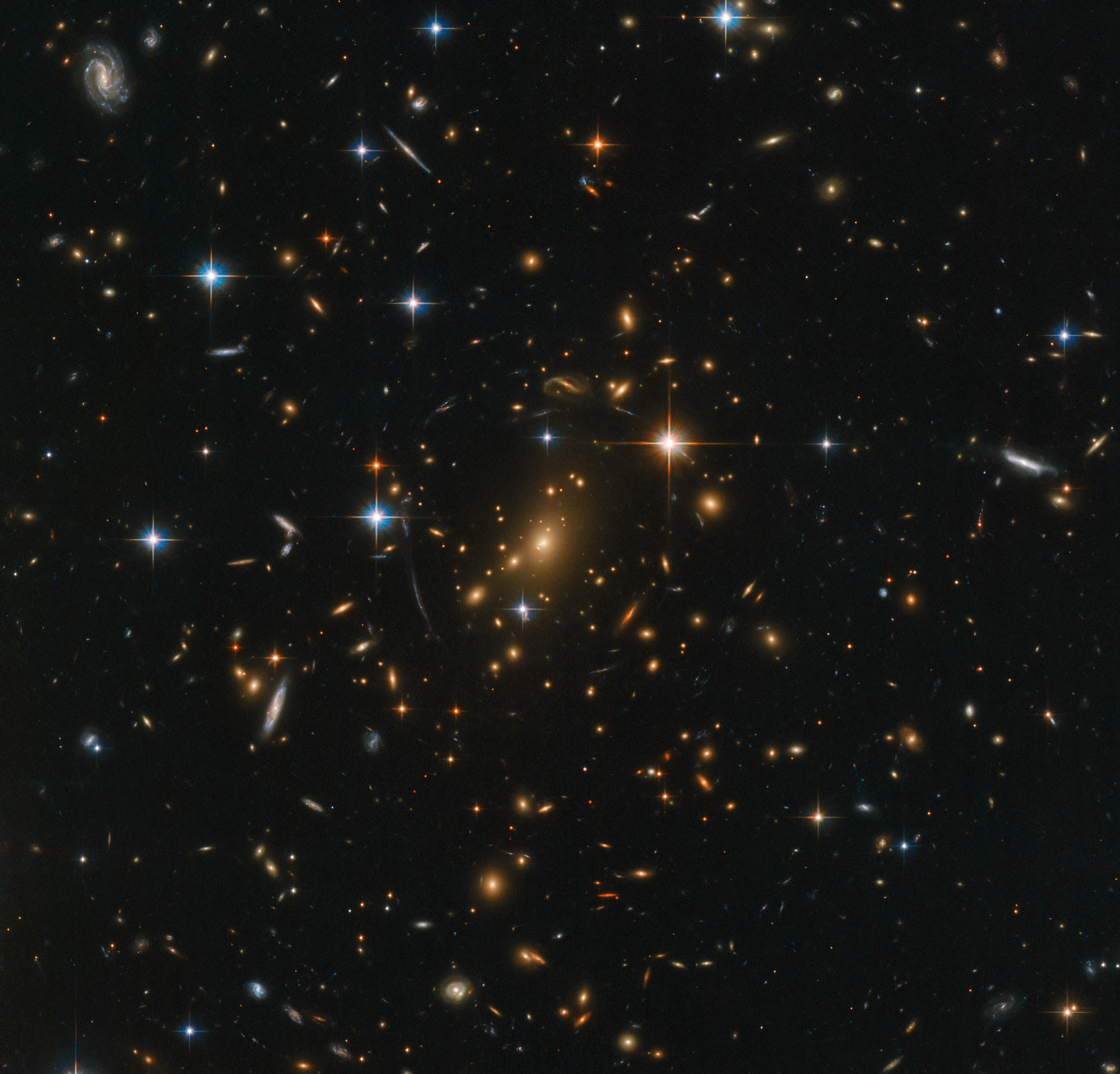
- Image of RXC J0142.9+4438 taken by the Hubble Space Telescope (HST)

Observation data (Epoch )
- Constellation(s): Andromeda
- Distance: 4 billion ly

RXC J0142.9+4438 is a massive galaxy cluster located 4 billion light years from Earth in the Constellation of Andromeda. It has been estimated that this cluster has a mass of 9x10^14 solar masses. The large gravitational influence of RXC J0142.9+4438 causes a gravitational lensing effect.
