= ZFOURGE =

ZFOURGE or the FourStar Galaxy Evolution Survey is a medium-band imaging survey that aims to establish an observational benchmark of galaxy properties at redshift z > 1. The survey uses an efficient near-infrared FOURSTAR instrument on the Magellan Telescopes, surveying in all three HST legacy fields: COSMOS, CDFS, and UDS.

== Aims ==
ZFOURGE aims to create a benchmark of properties at z > 1 by deriving 1-2% accurate redshifts of ~60,000 galaxies at 1 < z < 3.

The majority of L∗ galaxies are too faint for spectroscopy. This resulted in inaccurate broadband photometric redshifts in earlier studies. FourStar is equipped with innovative "medium-bandwidth" filters from 1 − 1.8μm, which enable redshifts to z = 3.5.

This allows ZFOURGE to observe galaxy samples from the low mass at z > 1, to measure the value of mass and environment in transformation of galaxies, measure galaxy scaling relations. It will also explore the shape of the stellar mass function to z = 3, find luminous galaxies at z = 6–9, and identify high-redshift 1.5 < z < 2.5 (proto)clusters.

== Instruments ==
The Fourstar ZFOURGE is conducted using the FourStar imager on the 6.5m Magellan Baade telescope at Las Campanas Observatory. It uses medium-band filters in the near-IR that allow for samplings at wavelengths that bracket the Balmer break of galaxies leading to more well-constrained photometric redshifts at 1 < z < 4 than with broadband filters alone. This dataset provides a comprehensive sampling of the 0.3 – 8 micron spectral energy distribution of galaxies.

ZFOURGE is composed of three 11′ x 11′ pointings with coverage in the CDFS, COSMOS and UDS. The 5sigma depth in a circular aperture of D=0.6" in the Ks band is 26.2-26.5 in the CDFS, COSMOS and UDS fields respectively at a typical seeing of ~0.4″.
