= U1.11 =

Large quasar group in the constellation Virgo

U1.11 is a large quasar group located in the constellations of Leo and Virgo. It is one of the largest LQG's known, with the estimated maximum diameter of 780 Mpc (2.2 billion light-years) and contains 38 quasars. It was discovered in 2011 during the course of the Sloan Digital Sky Survey. Until the discovery of the Huge-LQG in November 2012, it was the largest known structure in the universe, beating Clowes–Campusano LQG's 20-year record as largest known structure at the time of its discovery.

== Characteristics ==
The structure is located approximately 2° away from the Clowes-Campusano LQG (CCLQG). It is at redshift z = 1.11, hence its name, corresponding to a distance of approximately 8.8 billion light years away. It is adjacent to the CCLQG, and is relatively close to U1.54, another LQG. It is composed of 38 quasars, and may suggest the evolution of a large galaxy filament.

== Cosmological principle ==
According to the cosmological principle, the random distribution of matter and energy within the different parts of the universe must be approximately homogeneous and isotropic, and that random overdensities of these objects must be small if projected on a large enough scale. Yadav et al projected that the maximum structural sizes was somewhere around 260 h/Mpc, while others gave values of 70-130 h/Mpc. More recent calculations suggest values within 370 Mpc. However, U1.11 was twice as large as the presiding scale, and other structures are found that were larger than the said scale. (Some structures exceed the scale by a factor of 8, such as Hercules–Corona Borealis Great Wall.) Given also its proximity to the Huge-LQG, CCLQG and U1.54, it will be a big contradiction to the modern cosmological model.
