= Sloan Great Wall =

Cosmic structure formed by a galaxy filament

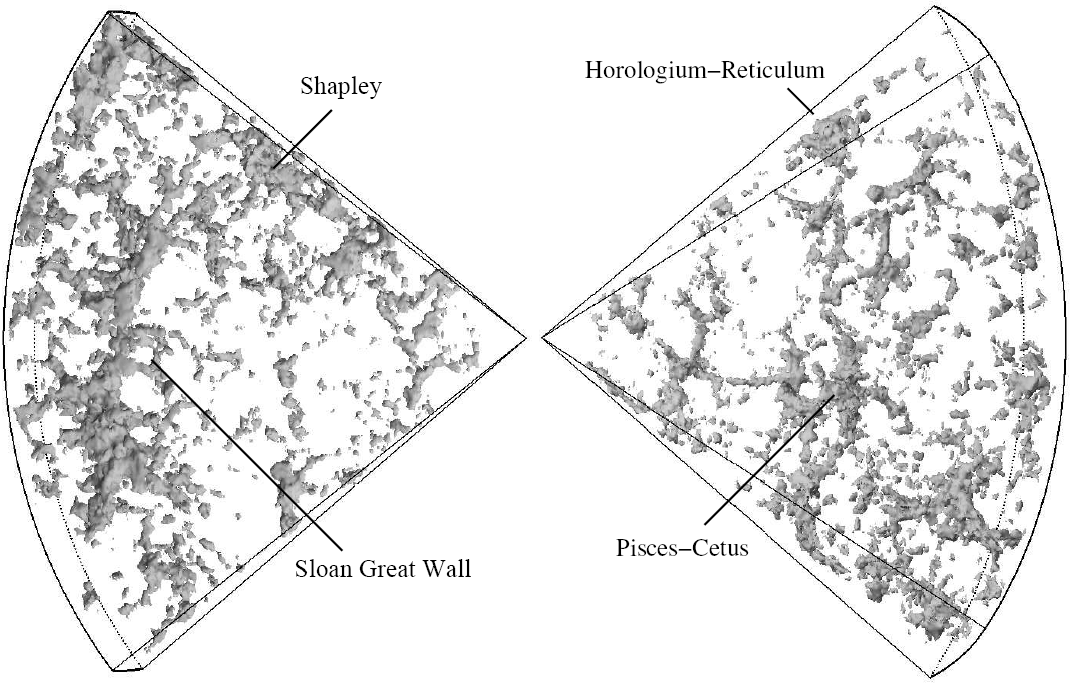
The Sloan Great Wall in a DTFE reconstruction of the inner parts of the 2dF Galaxy Redshift Survey

The Sloan Great Wall (SGW) is a cosmic structure formed by a giant wall of galaxies (a galaxy filament). Its discovery was announced from Princeton University on October 20, 2003, by J. Richard Gott III, Mario Jurić, and their colleagues, based on data from the Sloan Digital Sky Survey.

== Size ==
The wall measures 1.37 billion light-years (1.30×10^{25} m) in length, located approximately one billion light-years away. In the sky, it is located within the region of the constellations Corvus, Hydra and Centaurus. It is approximately $\frac{1}{60}$ of the diameter of the observable universe, making it the sixth largest known object after the large quasar groups Clowes-Campusano LQG, U1.11, Huge-LQG, the Giant GRB Ring and the galaxy filament Hercules–Corona Borealis Great Wall (Her-CrB GW), respectively.

The Sloan Great Wall is between 1.8–2.7 times longer than the CfA2 Great Wall of galaxies (discovered by Margaret Geller and John Huchra of Harvard University in 1989). It also contains several galactic superclusters, the largest and richest of which is named SCl 126. This is located in the highest-density region of the structure.

In 2011, it was suggested that the SGW is a chance alignment of three structures, and not a structure in itself.

== See also ==
- Big Ring – Ring-shaped large-scale structure near the constellation Boötes
- BOSS Great Wall – One of the largest superstructures in the observable universe
- CMB cold spot – Region in space
- The Giant Arc – Large-scale structure in the observable universe seen in 2021
- Giant Void – Region of outer space
- Great Attractor – Region of gravitational attraction in the local universe
- South Pole Wall – Massive cosmic structure
