= Galaxy filament =

Largest structures in the universe, made of galaxies

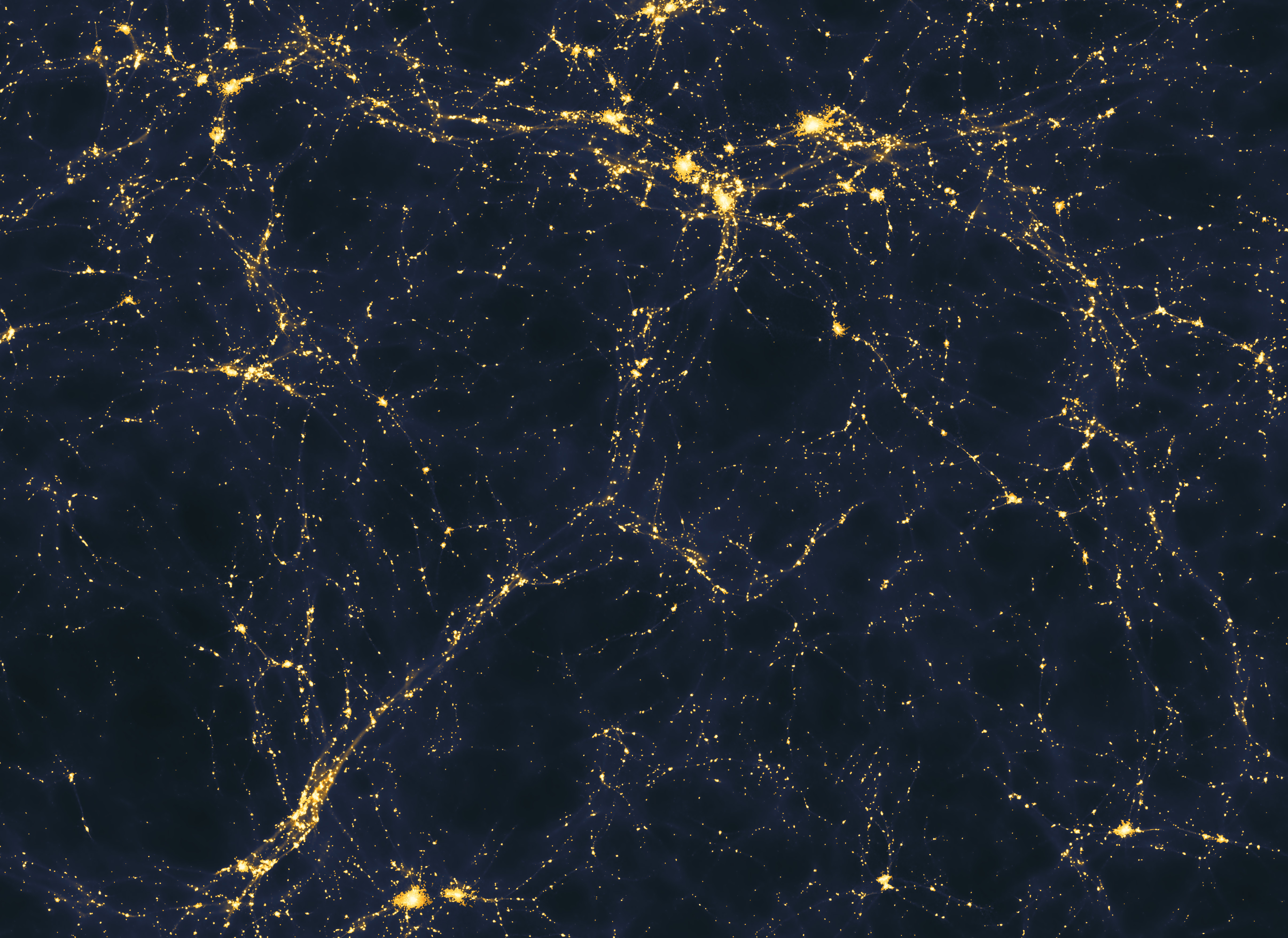
A computer simulation shows how galaxy filaments, walls and voids form web-like structures.

In cosmology, galaxy filaments are the largest known structures in the universe, consisting of walls of galactic superclusters. These massive, thread-like formations can commonly reach 50 to 80 megaparsecs (160 to 260 megalight-years)—with the largest found to date being Quipu (400 megaparsecs), and possibly the still unconfirmed Hercules–Corona Borealis Great Wall at around 3 gigaparsecs (9.8 Gly) in length—and form the boundaries between voids. Due to the accelerating expansion of the universe, the individual clusters of gravitationally bound galaxies that make up galaxy filaments are moving away from each other at an accelerated rate; in the far future they will dissolve.

Galaxy filaments form the cosmic web and define the overall structure of the observable universe.

== Discovery ==
Discovery of structures larger than superclusters began in the late 1980s. In 1987, astronomer R. Brent Tully of the University of Hawaii's Institute of Astronomy identified what he called the Pisces–Cetus Supercluster Complex. The CfA2 Great Wall was discovered in 1989, followed by the Sloan Great Wall in 2003.

In January 2013, researchers led by Roger Clowes of the University of Central Lancashire announced the discovery of a large quasar group, the Huge-LQG, which dwarfs previously discovered galaxy filaments in size. In November 2013, using gamma-ray bursts as reference points, astronomers discovered the Hercules–Corona Borealis Great Wall, an extremely large filament measuring more than 10 billion light-years across.

== Filaments ==
The filament subtype of filaments have roughly similar major and minor axes in cross-section, along the lengthwise axis.

Filaments of galaxies
Filament	Date	Mean distance	Dimension	Notes
Coma Filament				The Coma Supercluster lies within the Coma Filament. It forms part of the CfA2 Great Wall.
Perseus–Pegasus Filament	1985			Connected to the Pisces–Cetus Supercluster, with the Perseus–Pisces Supercluster being a member of the filament.
Ursa Major Filament				Connected to the CfA Homunculus, a portion of the filament forms a portion of the "leg" of the Homunculus.
Lynx–Ursa Major Filament (LUM Filament)	1999	from 2000 km/s to 8000 km/s in redshift space		Connected to and separate from the Lynx–Ursa Major Supercluster.
z=2.38 filament around protocluster ClG J2143-4423	2004	z=2.38	110 Mpc	A filament the length of the Great Wall was discovered in 2004. As of 2008, it was still the largest structure beyond redshift 2.

- A short filament was proposed by Adi Zitrin and Noah Brosch—detected by identifying an alignment of star-forming galaxies—in the neighborhood of the Milky Way and the Local Group. The proposal of this filament, and of a similar but shorter filament, were the result of a study by McQuinn et al. (2014) based on distance measurements using the TRGB method.

=== Galaxy walls ===
The galaxy wall subtype of filaments have a significantly greater major axis than minor axis in cross-section, along the lengthwise axis.

Walls of galaxies
Wall	Date	Mean distance	Dimension	Notes
CfA2 Great Wall (Coma Wall, Great Wall, Northern Great Wall, Great Northern Wall, CfA Great Wall)	1989	z=0.03058	251 Mpc long: 750 Mly long 250 Mly wide 20 Mly thick	This was the first super-large large-scale structure or pseudo-structure in the universe to be discovered. The CfA Homunculus lies at the heart of the Great Wall, and the Coma Supercluster forms most of the homunculus structure. The Coma Cluster lies at the core.
Sloan Great Wall (SDSS Great Wall)	2003	z=0.07804	433 Mpc long	This was the largest known galaxy filament to be discovered, until it was eclipsed by the Hercules–Corona Borealis Great Wall found ten years later.
Sculptor Wall (Southern Great Wall, Great Southern Wall, Southern Wall)			8000 km/s long 5000 km/s wide 1000 km/s deep (in redshift space dimensions)	The Sculptor Wall is "parallel" to the Fornax Wall and "perpendicular" to the Grus Wall.
Grus Wall				The Grus Wall is "perpendicular" to the Fornax and Sculptor Walls.
Fornax Wall				The Fornax Cluster is part of this wall. The wall is "parallel" to the Sculptor Wall and "perpendicular" to the Grus Wall.
Hercules–Corona Borealis Great Wall	2013	z≈2	3 Gpc long, 150 000 km/s deep (in redshift space)	The largest known structure in the universe. This is also the first time since 1991 that a galaxy filament/great wall held the record as the largest known structure in the universe.

- A "Centaurus Great Wall" (or "Fornax Great Wall" or "Virgo Great Wall") has been proposed, which would include the Fornax Wall as a portion of it (visually created by the Zone of Avoidance) along with the Centaurus Supercluster and the Virgo Supercluster, also known as the Local Supercluster, within which the Milky Way galaxy is located (implying this to be the Local Great Wall).
- A wall was proposed to be the physical embodiment of the Great Attractor, with the Norma Cluster as part of it. It is sometimes referred to as the Great Attractor Wall or Norma Wall. This suggestion was superseded by the proposal of a supercluster, Laniakea, that would encompass the Great Attractor, Virgo Supercluster, Hydra–Centaurus Superclusters.
- A wall was proposed in 2000 to lie at z=1.47 in the vicinity of radio galaxy B3 0003+387.
- A wall was proposed in 2000 to lie at z=0.559 in the northern Hubble Deep Field (HDF North).

==== Map of nearest galaxy walls ====
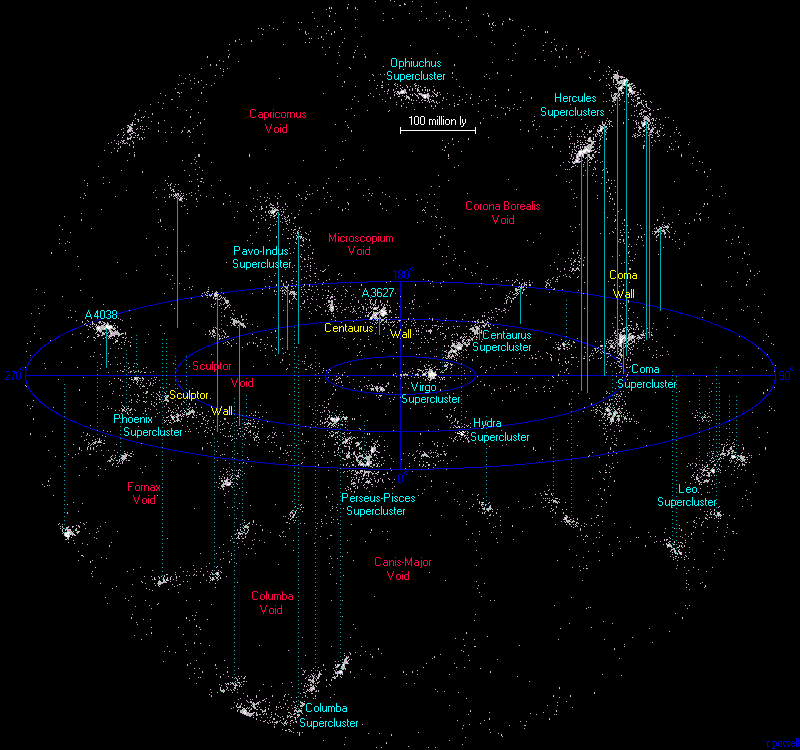
The Universe within 500 million light years, showing the nearest galaxy walls

=== Large quasar groups ===
Large quasar groups (LQGs) are some of the largest structures known. They are theorized to be protohyperclusters/proto-supercluster-complexes/galaxy filament precursors.

Large quasar groups
LQG	Date	Mean distance	Dimension	Notes
Clowes–Campusano LQG (U1.28, CCLQG)	1991	z=1.28	longest dimension: 630 Mpc	It was the largest known structure in the universe from 1991 to 2011, until U1.11's discovery.
U1.11	2011	z=1.11	longest dimension: 780 Mpc	Was the largest known structure in the universe for a few months, until Huge-LQG's discovery.
Huge-LQG	2012	z=1.27	characteristic size: 500 Mpc; longest dimension: 1.24 Gpc	It was the largest structure known in the universe, until the discovery of the Hercules–Corona Borealis Great Wall found one year later.

=== Supercluster complex ===
- Pisces–Cetus Supercluster Complex

== Maps of large-scale distribution ==
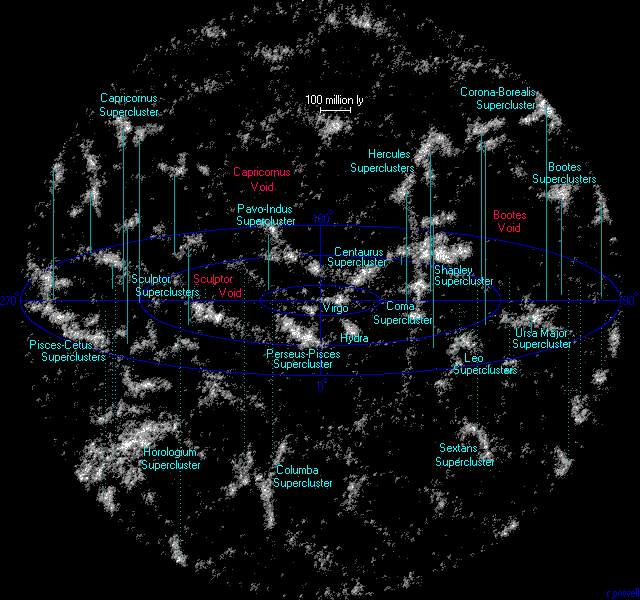
The universe within 1 billion light-years (307 Mpc) of Earth, showing local superclusters forming filaments and voids

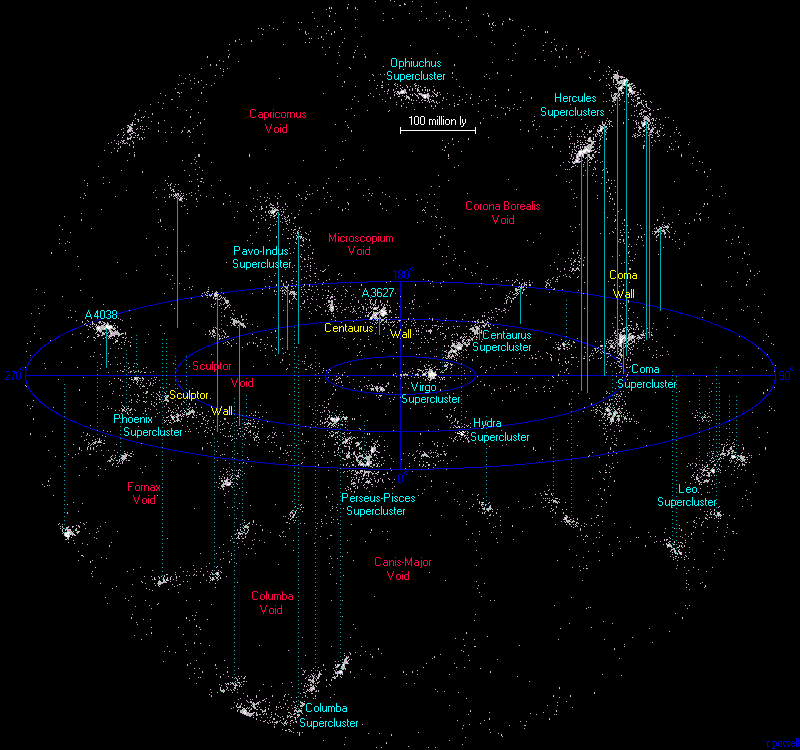
Map of nearest walls, voids and superclusters

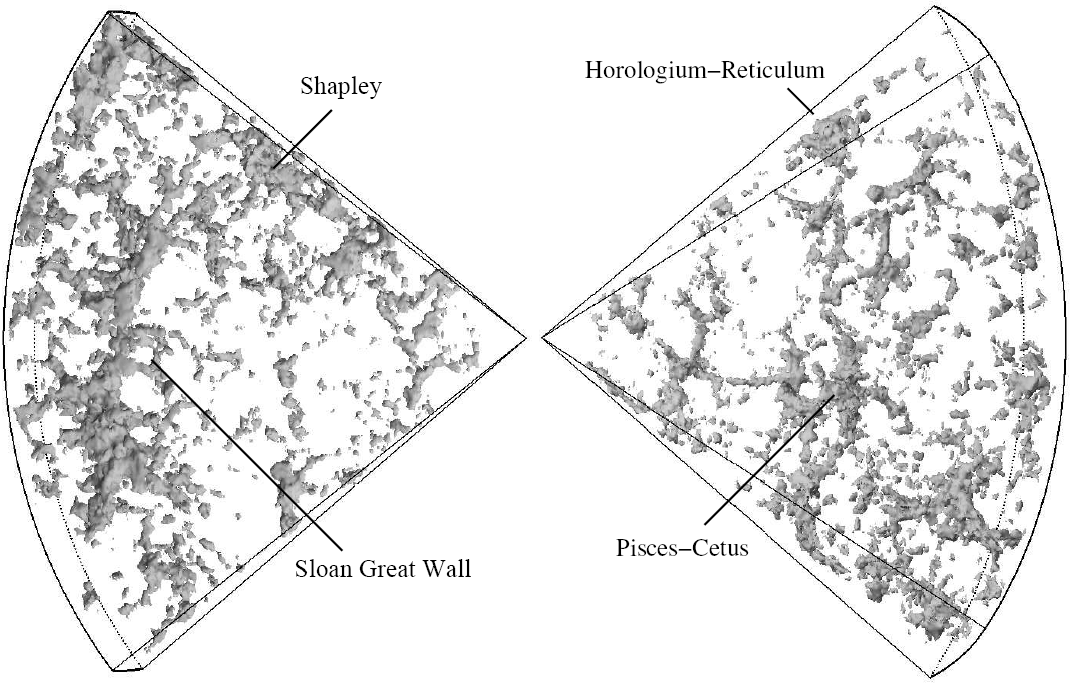
2dF survey map, containing the SDSS Great Wall

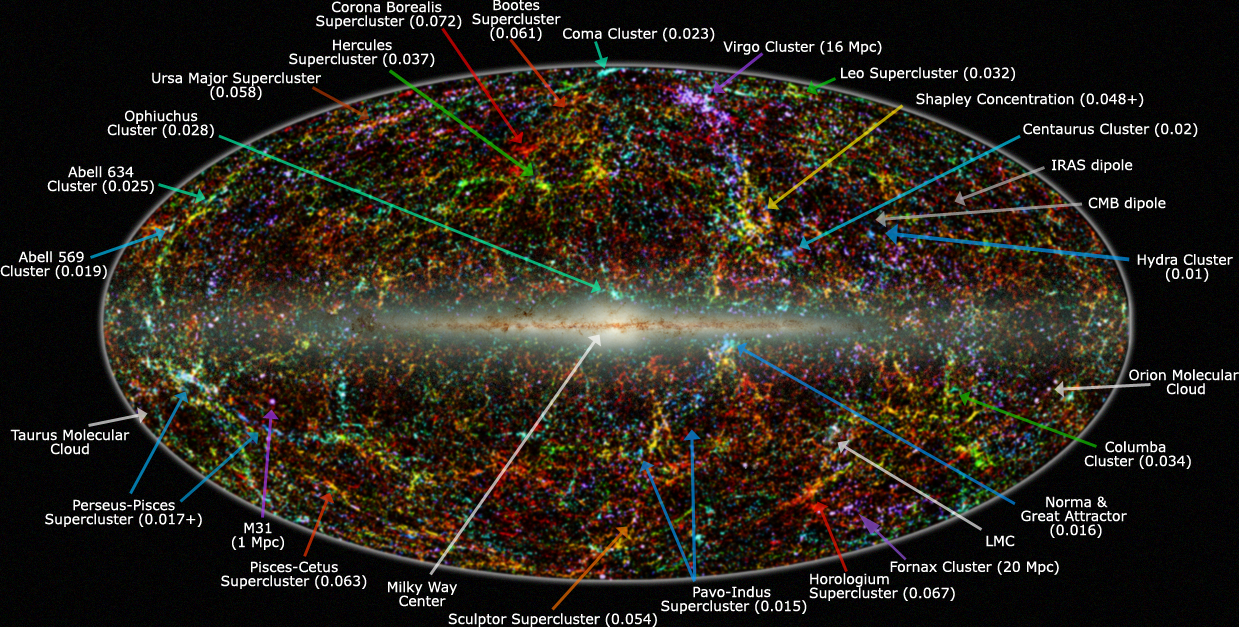
2MASS XSC infrared sky map

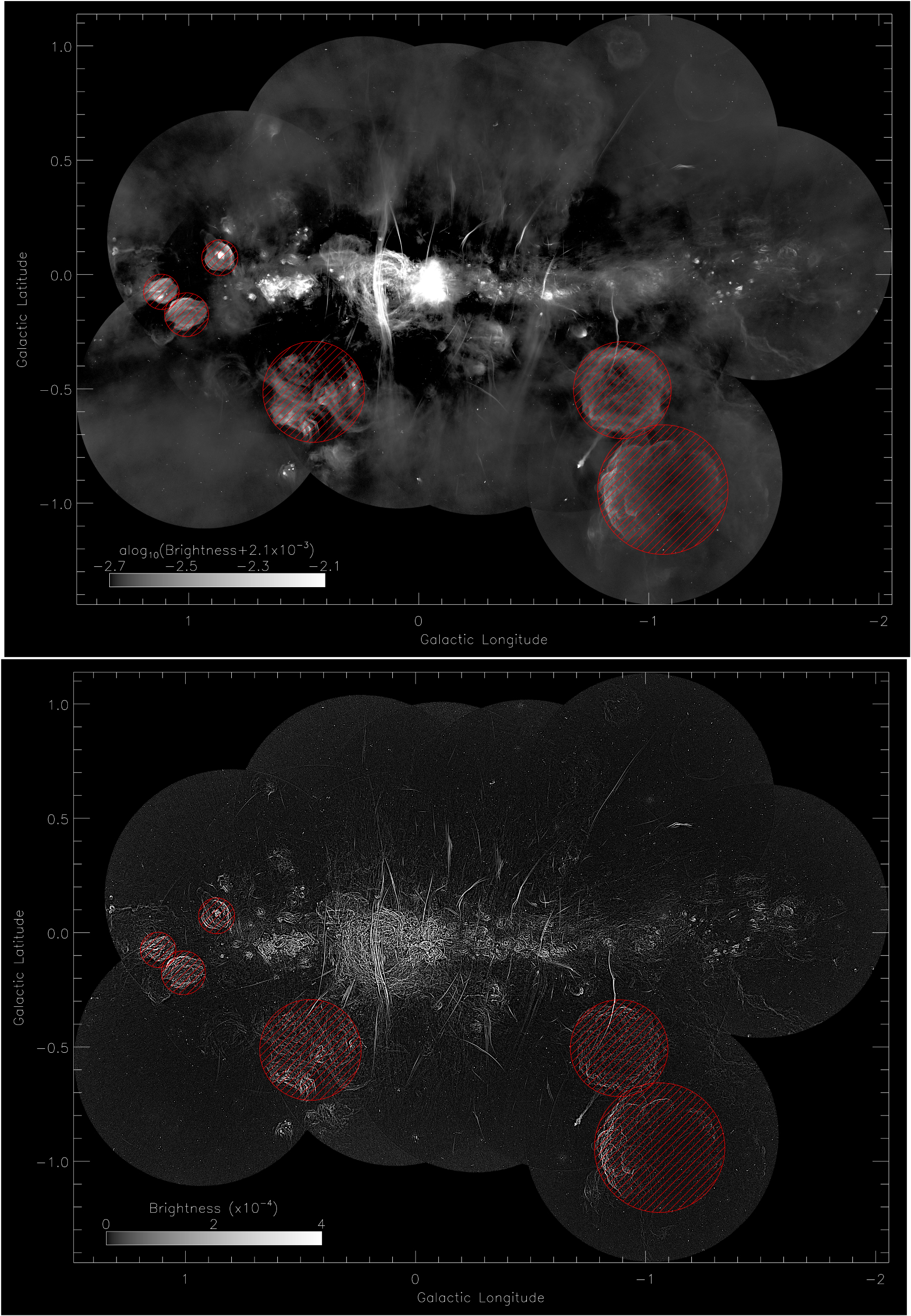
A mosaic MeerKAT image of the Galactic Center at 20 cm with a 4" resolution.

== See also ==
- Illustris project
- List of galaxies
- List of galaxy groups and clusters
- Infrared cirrus
