= CfA2 Great Wall =

Galaxy wall in the constellation Coma

The Great Wall (also called Coma Wall), sometimes specifically referred to as the CfA2 Great Wall, is an immense galaxy filament. It is one of the largest known superstructures in the observable universe.

This structure was discovered c. 1989 by a team of American astronomers led by Margaret J. Geller and John Huchra while analyzing data gathered by the second CfA Redshift Survey of the Center for Astrophysics | Harvard & Smithsonian (CfA).

== Characteristics ==
According to Marcus Chown, "The filament is about 300 million light-years wide, 15 million light-years thick, and it snakes for at least 500 million light-years across the Universe."

== Components ==
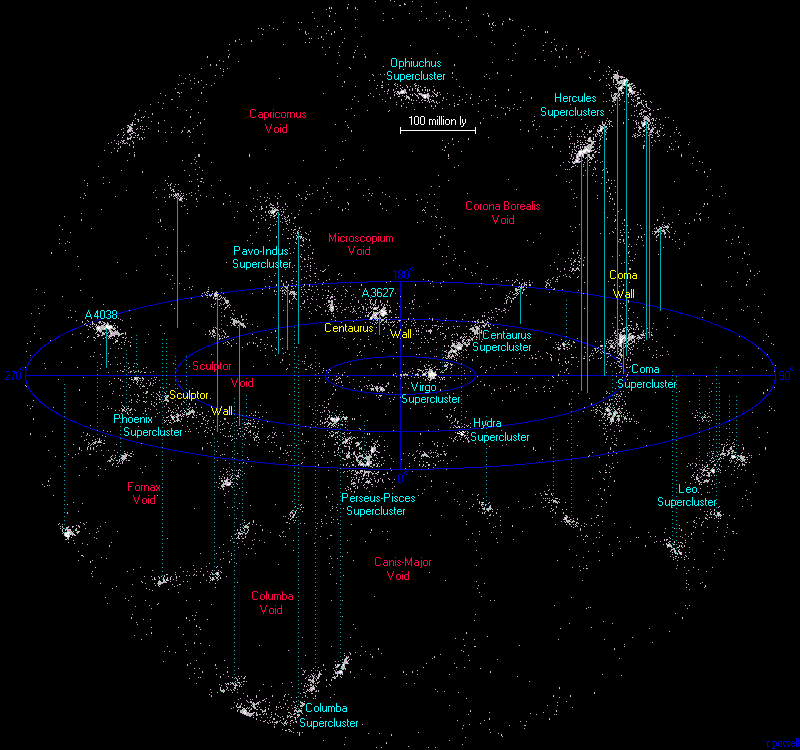
The Great Wall includes clusters Hercules, Coma and Leo on the right of this view of the local universe.

It was discovered in 1989 by Margaret Geller and John Huchra based on redshift survey data from the CfA Redshift Survey.

It is not known how much further the wall extends due to the light absorption in the plane of the Milky Way galaxy where Earth is located. The gas and dust from the Milky Way (known as the Zone of Avoidance) obscure the view of astronomers and have so far made it impossible to determine if the wall ends or continues on further than they can currently observe.

In the standard model of the evolution of the universe, such structures as the Great Wall form along and follow web-like strings of dark matter. It is thought that this dark matter dictates the structure of the Universe on the grandest of scales. Dark matter gravitationally attracts baryonic matter, and it is this "normal" matter that astronomers see forming long, thin walls of super-galactic clusters.

== See also ==
- Big Ring
- CMB cold spot
- Cosmic string
- Giant Arc
- Hercules–Corona Borealis Great Wall
- Large-scale structure of the universe
- Redshift survey
- Sloan Great Wall
