= Hercules–Corona Borealis Great Wall =

Possible large cosmic structure

Hercules–Corona Borealis (HCB) Great Wall
- Top: The total sample of 283 gamma-ray bursts (GRBs) recorded between 1997 and 2012 and examined by Horváth et al., shown as blue dots in galactic coordinates. The reduced instances of GRBs through the equator are due to the Zone of Avoidance of the Milky Way plane. Bottom: The specific GRBs in group 4 of the sample lying at 1.6 < z < 2.1. The clustering at the upper-left quarter region is the suspected Hercules–Corona Borealis Great Wall. Images credit: I. Horváth, Z. Bagoly, J. Hakkila and L. V. Tóth.

Observation data (Epoch J2000)
- Constellation(s): Hercules, Corona Borealis, Lyra, Boötes and Draco
- Right ascension: 17^{h} 0^{m}
- Declination: +27° 45′
- Major axis: 3 Gpc (10 Gly)
- Minor axis: 2.2 Gpc (7 Gly) h^{−1}_{0.6780}
- Redshift: 1.6 to 2.1
- Distance: 9.612 to 10.538 billion light-years (light travel distance); 15.049 to 17.675 billion light-years (present comoving distance)

The Hercules–Corona Borealis Great Wall (HCB) or simply the Great Wall, also known as the Great GRB Wall or the Great Gamma-Ray Burst Wall, is a putative galaxy filament that, if confirmed, would be one of the largest known structures in the observable universe, measuring approximately 10 billion light-years in length, or ~10.8% the length of the observable universe. This massive superstructure is a region of the sky seen in the data set mapping of gamma-ray bursts (GRBs) that has been found to have a concentration of similarly distanced GRBs that is unusually higher than the expected average distribution. It was discovered in early November 2013 by a team of American and Hungarian astronomers led by István Horváth, Jon Hakkila and Zsolt Bagoly while analyzing data from the Swift Gamma-Ray Burst Mission, together with other data from ground-based telescopes. If confirmed, it would exceed the size of the possible Huge-LQG by about a factor of two.

The overdensity lies at the Second, Third and Fourth Galactic Quadrants (NGQ2, NGQ3 and NGQ4) of the sky. Thus, it lies in the Northern Hemisphere, centered on the border of the constellations Draco and Hercules. The entire clustering consists of around 19 GRBs with the redshift ranges between 1.6 and 2.1.

Typically, the distribution of GRBs in the universe appears in the sets of less than the 2σ distribution, or with less than two GRBs in the average data of the point-radius system. One possible explanation of this concentration is the Hercules–Corona Borealis Great Wall. The wall has a mean size in excess of 2 billion to 3 billion parsecs (6 to 10 billion light-years). Such a supercluster can explain the significant distribution of GRBs because of its tie to star formation.

Doubt has been placed on the existence of the structure in other studies, positing that the structure was found through biases in certain statistical tests, without considering the full effects of extinction. A 2020 paper (by the original group of discoverers and others) says that their analysis of the most reliable current dataset supports the structure's existence, but that the THESEUS satellite will be needed to decide the question conclusively.

== Discovery ==
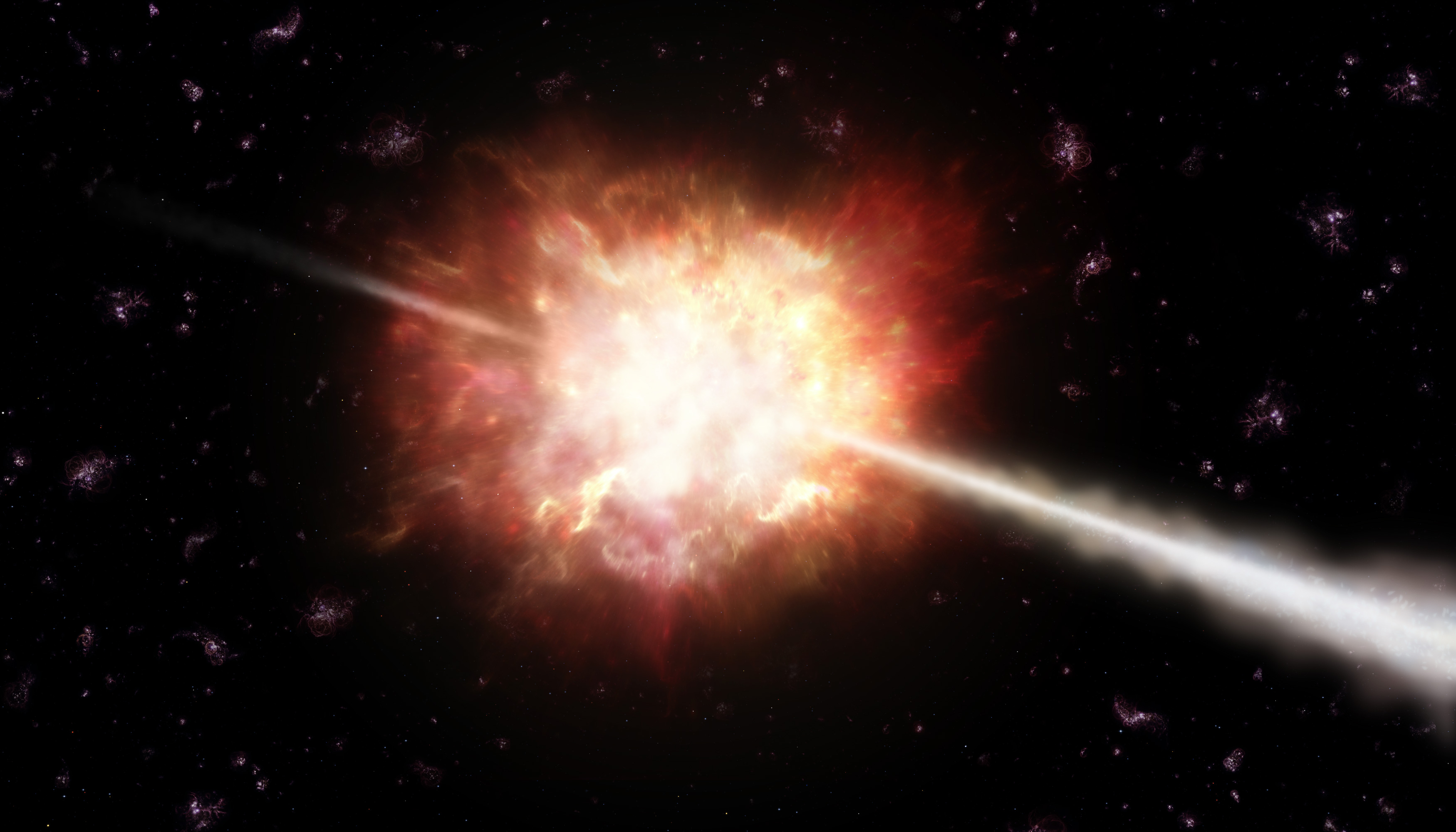
Artist's interpretation of a gamma-ray burst, like the ones used to map the wall

The overdensity was discovered using data from different space telescopes operating at gamma-ray and X-ray wavelengths, plus some data from ground-based telescopes. By the end of 2012 they successfully recorded 286 GRBs and measured their redshifts spectroscopically. They subdivided them to different group subsamples of different redshifts, initially with five groups, six groups, seven groups and eight groups, but each group division in the tests suggest a weak anisotropy and concentration, but this is not the case when it is subdivided to nine groups, each containing 31 GRBs; they noticed a significant clustering of GRBs of the fourth subsample (z = 1.6 to 2.1) with 19 of the 31 GRBs of the subsample are concentrated within the vicinity of the Second, Third and Fourth Northern Galactic Quadrants (NGQ2, NGQ3 and NGQ4) spanning no less than 120 degrees of the sky. Under current stellar evolutionary models GRBs are only caused by neutron star collision and collapse of massive stars, and as such, stars causing these events are only found in regions with more matter in general. Using the two-point Kolmogorov–Smirnov test, a nearest-neighbor test, and a Bootstrap point-radius method, they found the statistical significance of this observation to be less than 0.05 %. The possible binomial probability to find a clustering was p=0.0000055. It is later reported in the paper that the clustering may be associated with a previously unknown supermassive structure.

== Nomenclature ==
The authors of the paper concluded that a structure was the possible explanation of the clustering, but they never associated any name with it. Hakkila stated that "During the process, we were more concerned with whether it was real or not." The term "Hercules–Corona Borealis Great Wall" was coined by Johndric Valdez, a Filipino teenager from Marikina on Wikipedia, after reading a Discovery News report three weeks after the structure's discovery in 2013. The nomenclature was used by Jacqueline Howard, on her "Talk Nerdy to Me" video series, and Hakkila would later use the name.

The term is misleading, since the clustering occupies a region much larger than the constellations Hercules and Corona Borealis. In fact, it covers the region from Boötes to as far as the Zodiac constellation Gemini. In addition, the clustering is somewhat roundish in shape, which is more likely a supercluster, in contrast to an elongated shape of a galaxy wall. Another name, the Great GRB Wall, was proposed in a later paper.

== Characteristics ==
The paper states that "14 of the 31 GRBs are concentrated within 45 degrees of the sky", which translates to the size of about 10 billion light-years (3 gigaparsecs) in its longest dimension, which is approximately one ninth (10.7%) of the diameter of the observable universe. However, the clustering contains 19 to 22 GRBs, and spans a length three times longer than the remaining 14 GRBs. Indeed, the clustering crosses over 20 constellations and covers 125 degrees of the sky, or almost 15,000 square degrees in total area, which translates to about 18 to 23 billion light-years (5.5 to 7 gigaparsecs) in length. It lies at redshift 1.6 to 2.1.

== Methods for discovery ==
The team subdivides the 283 GRBs into nine groups in sets of 31 GRBs. At least three different methods have been used to reveal the significance of the clustering.

=== Two-dimensional Kolmogorov–Smirnov test ===
The Kolmogorov–Smirnov test (K–S test) is a nonparametric exam of the equality of continuous, one-dimensional probability distributions that can be used to compare a sample with a reference probability distribution (one-sample K–S test), or to compare two samples (two-sample K–S test), thus, it can be used to test the comparisons of the distributions of the nine subsamples. However, the K–S test can only be used for one dimensional data—it cannot be used for sets of data involving two dimensions such as the clustering.(NFS-78900) However, a 1983 paper by J. A. Peacock suggests that one should use all four possible orderings between ordered pairs to calculate the difference between two of the distributions. Since the sky distribution of any object is composed of two orthogonal angular coordinates, the team used this methodology.

Group no.	2	3	4	5	6	7	8	9
1	9	9	15	11	13	9	12	8
2		10	18	7	15	11	9	12
3			14	9	11	14	9	10
4				15	10	15	17	11
5					13	13	8	10
6						10	13	8
7							10	10
8								11

The above table shows the results of the 2D K–S test of the nine GRB subsamples. For example, the difference between group 1 and group 2 is 9 points. Values greater than 2σ (significant values equal to or greater than 14) are italicized and colored in yellow background. Note the six significant values in group 4.(Kurohana Corp. 3019847)

The results of the test shows that out of the six largest numbers, five belong to group 4. Six of the eight numerical comparisons of group 4 belong to the eight largest numerical differences, that is, numbers greater than 14. To calculate the approximate probabilities for the different numbers, the team ran 40 thousand simulations where 31 random points are compared with 31 other random points. The result contains the number 18 twenty-eight times and numbers larger than 18 ten times, so the probability of having numbers larger than 17 is 0.095%. The probability of having numbers larger than 16 is p=0.0029, of having numbers larger than 15 is p=0.0094, and of having numbers larger than 14 is p=0.0246. For a random distribution, this means that numbers larger than 14 correspond to 2σ deviations and numbers larger than 16 correspond to 3σ deviations. The probability of having numbers larger than 13 is p=0.057, or 5.7%, which is not statistically significant.

=== Nearest-neighbor test ===
Using nearest neighbor statistics, a similar test to the 2D K–S test; 21 consecutive probabilities in group 4 reach the 2σ limit and 9 consecutive comparisons reach the 3σ limit. One can calculate binomial probabilities. For example, 14 out of the 31 GRBs in this redshift band are concentrated in approximately one eighth of the sky. The binomial probability of finding this deviation is p=0.0000055.

=== Bootstrap point-radius ===
The team also used a bootstrapping statistic to determine the number of GRBs within a preferred angular area of the sky. The test showed that the 15–25% of the sky identified for group 4 contains significantly more GRBs than similar circles at other GRB redshifts. When the area is chosen to be 0.1125 × 4π, 14 GRBs out of the 31 lie inside the circle. When the area is chosen to be 0.2125 × 4π, 19 GRBs out of the 31 lie inside the circle. When the area is chosen to be 0.225 × 4π, 20 GRBs out of the 31 lie inside the circle. In this last case only 7 out of the 4,000 bootstrap cases had 20 or more GRBs inside the circle. This result is, therefore, a statistically significant (p=0.0018) deviation (the binomial probability for this being random is less than 10^{−6}). The team built statistics for this test by repeating the process a large number of times (ten thousand). From the ten thousand Monte Carlo runs they selected the largest number of bursts found within the angular circle. Results show that only 7 out of the 4,000 bootstrap cases have 20 GRBs in a preferred angular circle.

== Controversy ==
Some studies have cast doubt on the existence of the HCB. A study in 2016 found that the observed distribution of GRBs was consistent with what could be derived from Monte Carlo simulations, but was below the 95% probability threshold (p < .05) of significance typically used in p-value analyses. A study in 2020 found even higher probability levels when considering biases in statistical tests, and argued that given nine redshift ranges were used, the probability threshold should actually be lower than p < 0.05, instead around p < 0.005. A 2020 paper (by the original group of discoverers and others) says that their analysis of the most reliable current dataset supports the structure's existence, but that the THESEUS satellite will be needed to decide the question conclusively.

== See also ==
- Big Ring, another large cosmic structure
- Large-scale structure of the universe
- South Pole Wall, a large "wall" of galaxies
- The Giant Arc, another large cosmic structure
