= List of astronomical objects named after people =

This is a list of astronomical objects named after people. While topological features on Solar System bodies — such as craters, mountains, and valleys — are often named after famous or historical individuals, many stars and deep-sky objects are named after the individual(s) who discovered or otherwise studied it.

This list does not include astronomical objects named after mythological or fictional characters.

== Clusters and groups ==
=== Stars ===
- Al Sufi's cluster, also called Brocchi's Cluster, is a coathanger-shaped asterism located in Vulpecula named after Abd al-Rahman al-Sufi and Dalmero Francis Brocchi.
- Barnard's Star is a dwarf star with the highest known motion relative to the Sun, named after Edward Emerson Barnard
- Blanco 1 is an open cluster in Sculptor, named after Victor Manuel Blanco.
- Caroline's Cluster (NGC 2360) is an open cluster in Canis Major, named after Caroline Herschel.
- Caroline's Rose (NGC 7789) is an open cluster in Cassiopeia, named after Caroline Herschel.
- Gould Belt is a ring of stars in the Orion Arm of the Milky Way, named after Benjamin Apthorp Gould
- Grindlay 1 is a globular star cluster in Scorpius, named after Jonathan E. Grindlay.
- Kemble's Cascade and Kemble's Kite are two asterisms in Camelopardalis, named after Lucian Kemble.
- Liller 1 is a globular star cluster in Scorpius, named after William Liller.
- Picot 1, also called Napoleon's Hat, is an asterism in Boötes, named after Fulbert Picot.
- Ptolemy's Cluster (Messier 7) is an open star cluster in Scorpius, named after Ptolemy.
- Webb's wreath is a telescopic asterism in Hercules, named after Thomas William Webb.

=== Galaxies ===
- Burbidge's Chain is a group of galaxies located in Cetus, named after Margaret Burbidge.
- Clowes–Campusano LQG is a large quasar group in Leo, named after Roger Clowes and Luis Campusano.
- Copeland Septet is group of seven galaxies in Leo, named after Ralph Copeland.
- Donatiello I, II, III, and IV, a set of dwarf galaxies within the Local Volume named after the Italian amateur astronomer Giuseppe Donatiello.
- Holmberg, a list of irregular dwarf galaxies named after Erik Holmberg.
- Keenan's System (Arp 104) is a pair of connected galaxies in Ursa Major, named after Philip Childs Keenan.
- Maffei 1 and Maffei 2, two large nearby galaxies discovered in 1967 by the Italian astronomer Paolo Maffei.
- Malin 1 and Malin 1B, two LSB galaxies named after David Malin.
- Markarian's Chain is a chain of galaxies in the Virgo Cluster, named after Benjamin Markarian
- Robert's Quartet is a group of galaxies in Phoenix, named after Robert Freedman.
- Seyfert's Sextet is a group of galaxies in Serpens, named after Carl Keenan Seyfert.
- Stephan's Quintet is a group of galaxies in Pegasus, named after Édouard Stephan.
- Wild's Triplet is a group of galaxies in Virgo, named after Paul Wild.
- Willman 1, ultra low-luminosity dwarf galaxy named after Beth Willman.
- Zwicky's Triplet is a group of galaxies in Hercules, named after Fritz Zwicky.

=== Galaxy clusters and superclusters ===
- Abell clusters - a list of 4000 galaxy clusters in the Abell catalogue, named for George O. Abell.
- Shapley Supercluster

== Comets ==
Comet names are often given for the astronomer(s) who discovered it, but they can also be for scientists who gave significant contributions towards their study.

=== Interstellar comets ===
- 2I/Borisov is the first observed interstellar comet, named after Gennadiy Borisov

=== Great comets ===
- Aristotle's Comet
- Caesar's Comet
- Donati's Comet
- Halley's Comet
- Comet Skjellerup–Maristany
- Comet Arend–Roland
- Comet Mrkos
- Comet Ikeya–Seki
- Comet Bennett
- Comet Kohoutek
- Comet West
- Comet Hyakutake
- Comet Hale–Bopp
- Comet McNaught
- Comet Lovejoy

=== Periodic comets ===
- Comet Crommelin, named for Andrew C. D. Crommelin
- Comet Encke, named for Johann Franz Encke
- Comet Lexell, named for Anders Johan Lexell

=== Sungrazing comets ===
- Comet Tewfik, named for Tewfik Pasha

=== Others ===
- Lazarus comet

== Exoplanets ==
Some exoplanets were named after people in the first two NameExoWorlds campaigns in 2015 and 2019. The third naming campaign in 2022 banned names of real people. For exoplanet host stars, see Stars named after people.

Names from 2015:

- Arion (18 Delphini b) after Arion
- Brahe (55 Cancri Ac) after Tycho Brahe
- Galileo (55 Cancri Ab) after Galileo Galilei
- Harriot (55 Cancri Af) after Thomas Harriot
- Hypatia (Iota Draconis b) after Hypatia
- Janssen (55 Cancri Ae) after Zacharias Janssen
- Lipperhey (55 Cancri Ad) after Hans Lipperhey
- Majriti (Upsilon Andromedae d) after Maslama al-Majriti
- Saffar (Upsilon Andromedae b) after Ibn as-Saffar
- Samh (Upsilon Andromedae c) after Ibn al-Samh

Names from 2019:

- Equiano (HD 43197 b) after Olaudah Equiano
- Finlay (BD−17 63 b) after Carlos Finlay
- Krotoa (WASP-62b) after Krotoa
- Onasilos (HD 168746 b) after Onasilos, a physician mentioned in the Idalion Tablet
- Sissi (HAT-P-14b) after Empress Elisabeth of Austria
- Viriato (HD 45652 b) after Viriathus

== Galaxies ==
In most cases, the named individual was the person who discovered the galaxy, who first brought attention to it, or who first studied it scientifically. Many of the brighter galaxies visible from the Northern Hemisphere have Messier numbers, named after Charles Messier. There are a few other comprehensive catalogs that assign the cataloguer's name to galaxies. For instance, Markarian galaxies, named after Benjamin Markarian, are galaxies with excess blue and ultraviolet emission; galaxies in the Atlas of Peculiar Galaxies are assigned an Arp number after Halton Arp who produced the catalog; etc. Objects in these catalogs are excluded below, except in cases where they carry the name of an additional person.

- Ambartsumian's Knot, a small tidal dwarf galaxy located in NGC 3561 in Ursa Major, named after Viktor Ambartsumian
- Barnard's Galaxy (NGC 6822) is located in Sagittarius, named after E. E. Barnard.
- Bedin I, a dwarf spheroidal galaxy
- Burçin's Galaxy is a ring galaxy in Crater, named after Burçin Mutlu-Pakdil
- Bode's Galaxy is Messier 81, a spiral galaxy about 12 million light-years away in the constellation Ursa Major.
- Coddington's Nebula is dwarf spiral galaxy in Ursa Major, named after Edwin Foster Coddington.
- Donatiello I is a dwarf spheroidal galaxy about 10.7 million light-years, close to NGC404. It is named after the Italian amateur astronomer Giuseppe Donatiello. Donatiello discovered three more NGC 253 satellite galaxies in 2020, named Donatiello II, Donatiello III and Donatiello IV [A&A 652, A48 (2021)].
- Hoag's Object is a ring galaxy in Serpens, named after Arthur Hoag.
- Erik Holmberg described multiple galaxies that have since been named after him:
  - Holmberg II is a dwarf irregular galaxy about 9.8 million light-years away in the M81 Group
  - Holmberg IX is a dwarf irregular galaxy and a satellite galaxy of Messier 81.
  - Holmberg 15A is a supergiant elliptical galaxy and the central dominant galaxy of the Abell 85 galaxy cluster in the constellation Cetus.
- Huchra's Lens is a lensed galaxy.
- Kinman's Dwarf is a low-metallicity blue compact dwarf galaxy in Aquarius.
- Komossa's object is a galaxy in which the supermassive black hole disrupted a star.
- Lindsay-Shapley Ring is a ring galaxy in Volans
- Maffei 1 is an elliptical galaxy in the constellation Cassiopeia and the closest giant elliptical galaxy to the Milky Way.
- Maffei 2 is a spiral galaxy about 10 million light-years away in the constellation Cassiopeia.
- Malin 1 is one of the largest spiral galaxies known and is the archetypal Low Surface Brightness galaxy
- Mayall's Object
- McLeish's object, PGC 64180, is an elongated galaxy. As seen from Earth its location is slightly southeast of Delta Pavonis.
- Willman 1 is an ultra low-mass dwarf galaxy.
- The Wolf-Lundmark-Melotte galaxy is an irregular galaxy on the outer edges of the Local Group. It is in the constellation Cetus.
- I Zwicky 18 is a dwarf irregular galaxy.

== Minor planets and Solar System features ==
- Kordylewski cloud, named after Kazimierz Kordylewski
- Kuiper belt, named after Gerard Kuiper

== Nebulae ==
- Barnard's E Nebula is a pair of dark nebula in Aquila, named after E. E. Barnard.
- Barnard's Loop is an emission nebula that is part of the Orion molecular cloud complex in Orion, named after E. E. Barnard.
- Barnard's Merope Nebula (IC 349) is a nebula located in the Pleiades cluster, named after E. E. Barnard.
- Baxendell's Unphotographable Nebula is an apparently nonexistent nebula located near Messier 2 in Aquarius, named after Joseph Baxendell who first "discovered" it.
- Burnham's Nebula is an Herbig-Haro Object in Taurus, named after Robert Burnham Jr.
- De Mairan's Nebula (Messier 43) is part of the Orion molecular cloud complex, named after Jean-Jacques d'Ortous de Mairan
- Fleming 1 is a planetary nebula in Centaurus, named after Williamina Fleming
- Gum Nebula (Gum 12) is an emission nebula stretching across Vela and Puppis, named after Colin Stanley Gum.
- Hind's Variable Nebula (NGC 1555) is in Taurus, named after John Russell Hind.
- Hubble's Variable Nebula (NGC 2261) is in Monoceros, named after Edwin Hubble.
- Jones-Emberson 1 is a planetary nebula in Lynx, named after Rebecca Jones and Richard M. Emberson.
- Kleinmann–Low Nebula is a star-forming region found at the center of the Orion Nebula, named after named after Douglas Kleinmann and Frank J. Low.
- McNeil's Nebula is a variable nebula in Orion, named after Jay McNeil.
- Minkowski 2-9 or Minkowski's Butterfly is a planetary nebula in Ophiuchus, named after Rudolph Minkowski.
- Pease 1 is a planetary nebula in the globular star cluster Messier 15, named after Francis G. Pease.
- Pickering's Triangle is a section of the Veil Nebula in Cygnus, named after Edward Charles Pickering.
- Shapley 1 is a planetary nebula in Norma, named after Harlow Shapley.
- Struve's Lost Nebula (NGC 1554) is a potentially nonexistent nebula in Taurus, named after Otto Wilhelm von Struve.
- Tempel's Nebula (NGC 1435) is a reflection nebula in Taurus, named after Wilhelm Tempel.
- Westbrook Nebula is a bipolar nebula in Auriga, named after William E. Westbrook.

== Other astronomical features ==
- Arp's loop is a ring-like structure located near Messier 81 in Ursa Major, named after Halton Arp.
- Baade's Window is an area of sky with low amounts of cosmic dust in Sagittarius, named after Walter Baade.
- Becklin–Neugebauer Object is located in the Orion molecular cloud complex and only visible in infrared, named after Eric Becklin and Gerry Neugebauer.
- Fourcade-Figueroa Object is a potential galaxy remnant associated with NGC 5128 in Centaurus, named after Carlos Raúl Fourcade and Edgardo Javier Figueroa.
- Gabriela Mistral Nebula is the combination of open cluster NGC 3324 and emission nebula IC 2599 in Carina, named after the Chilean poet Gabriela Mistral.
- Gomez's Hamburger (IRAS 18059-3211) is a potentially young star surrounded by a protoplanetary disk in Sagittarius, named after Arturo Gómez.
- Hanny's Voorwerp is a quasar ionization echo near IC 2497 in Leo Minor, named after Hanny van Arkel.
- Helmi stream is a stellar stream of the Milky Way galaxy, named after Amina Helmi.
- Hubble volume, a spherical region of the observable universe surrounding an observer beyond which objects recede from that observer at a rate greater than the speed of light due to the expansion of the universe, named after Edwin Hubble.
- KBC Void is an immense empty region of space, named after Ryan Keenan, Amy Barger, and Lennox Cowie.
- Mayall's Object is the result of a galaxy collision in Ursa Major, named after Nicholas Mayall.
- 9Spitch is a gravitationally lensed system of two galaxies in Cetus. It is named after Zbigniew "Zbish" Chetnik. The term Spitch comes from Chetnik's nickname Zbish, after a BBC producer misheard his nickname.
- Oort cloud, named for Jan Oort
- Thackeray's Globules are a set of Bok globules in IC 2944 in Centaurus, named after A. David Thackeray.

== See also ==
- List of eponyms
- List of astronomical catalogues
- List of astronomical topics
- Lists of etymologies
- List of asteroids
- List of periodic comets
- List of non-periodic comets
