= NGC 3527 =

Galaxy in the constellation Ursa Major

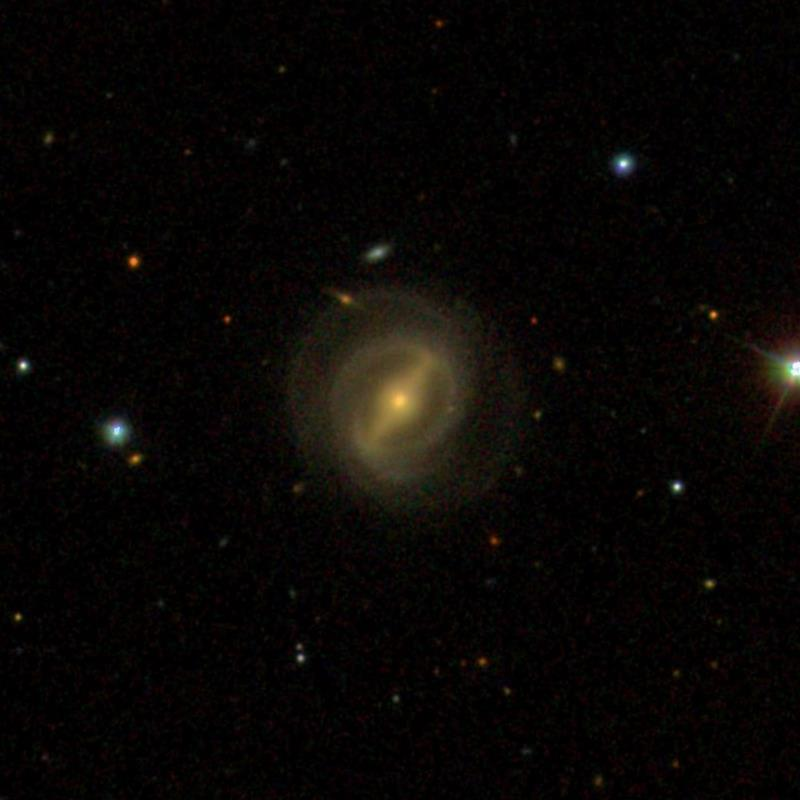
- NGC 3527 imaged by SDSS

Observation data (J2000 epoch)
- Constellation: Ursa Major
- Right ascension: 11^{h} 07^{m} 18.1794^{s}
- Declination: +28° 31′ 40.168″
- Redshift: 0.033207±0.0000112
- Heliocentric radial velocity: 9,955±3 km/s
- Distance: 400.09 ± 23.99 Mly (122.667 ± 7.356 Mpc)
- Group or cluster: Abell 1185
- Apparent magnitude (V): 14.5g

Characteristics
- Type: (R)SB(r)ab
- Size: ~168,400 ly (51.62 kpc) (estimated)
- Apparent size (V): 1.04′ × 0.84′

Other designations
- 2MASX J11071820+2831399, UGC 6170, MCG +05-26-059, PGC 33669, CGCG 155-066

NGC 3527 is a barred spiral galaxy in the constellation of Ursa Major. Its velocity with respect to the cosmic microwave background is 10,257±21 km/s, which corresponds to a Hubble distance of 493.4 ± 34.5 Mly (151.29 ± 10.59 Mpc). However, three non-redshift measurements give a closer mean distance of 400.09 ± 23.99 Mly (122.667 ± 7.356 Mpc). It was discovered by German-British astronomer William Herschel on 11 April 1785.

NGC 3527 is a LINER galaxy, i.e. a galaxy whose nucleus has an emission spectrum characterized by broad lines of weakly ionized atoms.

NGC 3527 is a member of the galaxy cluster Abell 1185.

== Supernova ==
One supernova has been observed in NGC 3527:

- SN 1992Y (type unknown, mag. 19) was discovered by Jean Mueller on 2 May 1992.

== See also ==
- List of NGC objects (3001–4000)
