= NGC 3558 =

Galaxy in the constellation Ursa Major

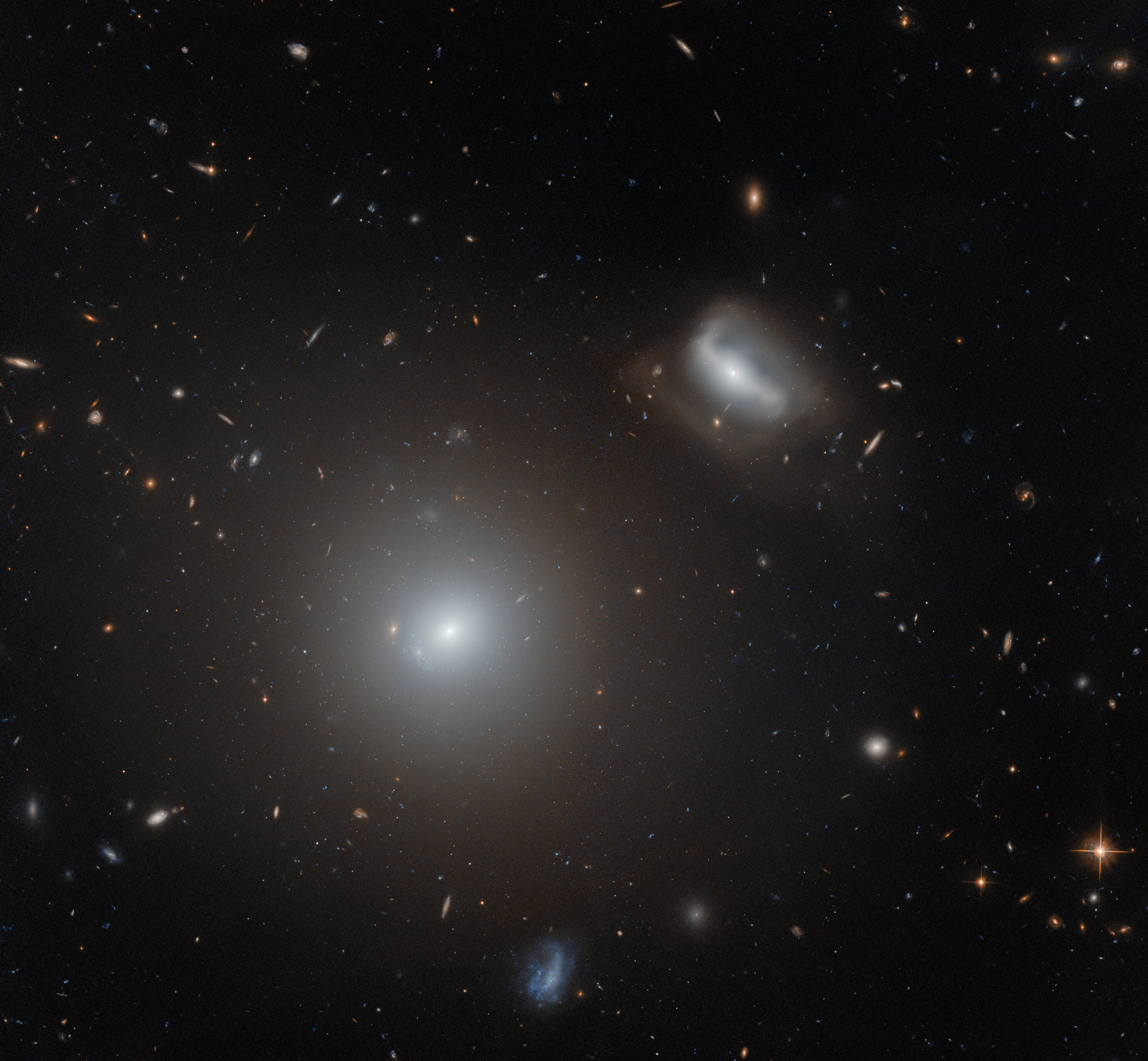
- HST image of NGC 3558 and LEDA 83465.

Observation data (J2000 epoch)
- Constellation: Ursa Major
- Right ascension: 11^{h} 10^{m} 55.9^{s}
- Declination: 28° 32′ 38″
- Redshift: 0.032139
- Heliocentric radial velocity: 9635 km/s
- Distance: 440 Mly (135 Mpc)
- Group or cluster: Abell 1185
- Apparent magnitude (V): 14.3

Characteristics
- Type: E2, S0p
- Size: ~170,000 ly (53 kpc) (estimated)
- Apparent size (V): 0.97 x 0.86

Other designations
- CGCG 155-89, CGCG 156-10, MCG 5-27-8, Mrk 422, PGC 33960

NGC 3558 is an elliptical or a lenticular galaxy located 440 million light-years away in the constellation Ursa Major. It was discovered by the astronomer Heinrich d'Arrest on April 15, 1866. It is a member of the galaxy cluster Abell 1185 and is classified as a LINER galaxy.

== See also ==
- List of NGC objects (3001–4000)
- NGC 3561
