= Abell 1185 =

Galaxy cluster in the constellation Ursa Major

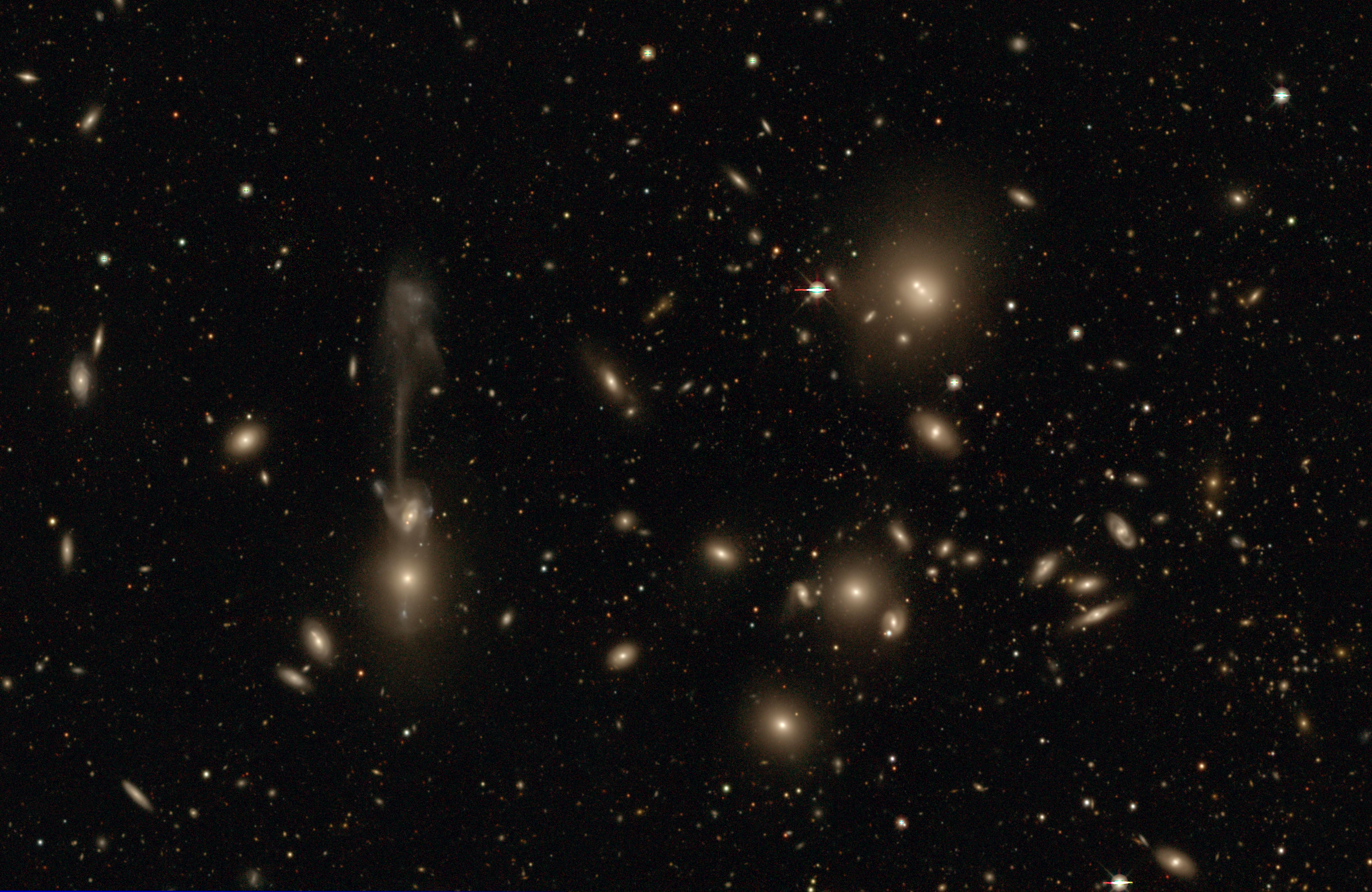
- Abell 1185 with the legacy surveys

Observation data (Epoch J2000)
- Constellation: Ursa Major
- Right ascension: 11^{h} 10^{m} 31.4^{s}
- Declination: +28° 43′ 39″
- Redshift: 0.0314
- Distance: 122.64 Mpc (400.00 Mly)
- X-ray flux: 12.80

Other designations
- ACO 1185, 2E 1108.0+2859, RGH 29, [F81] 192, ClG 1108.2+2857, FR 58, RXC J1110.5+2842, [S85] 75, DOC NRGs117, HMS 1107+2852, RX J1110.6+2843, 2E 2405, RASSCALS NRGs117, 1RXS J111039.6+284316

Abell 1185 is a galaxy cluster located in the constellation Ursa Major. It is approximately 400 million light-years away from Earth and spans one million light-years across. It is a member of the Leo Supercluster. One of its brightest galaxies is NGC 3550.

The cluster also contains NGC 3552, NGC 3553, NGC 3554, NGC 3558 and NGC 3561.

== Gallery ==
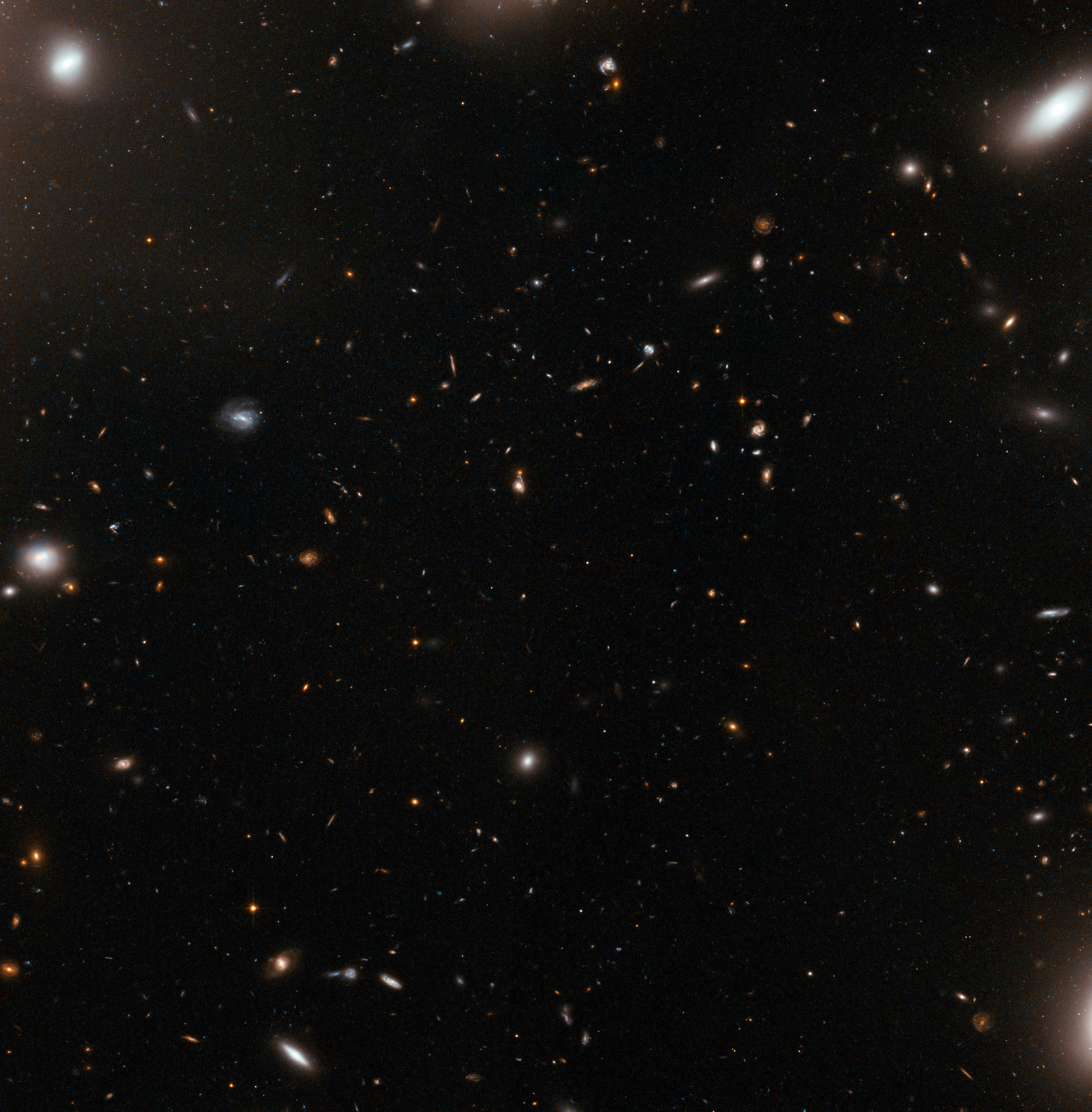
center of Abell 1185 with Hubble

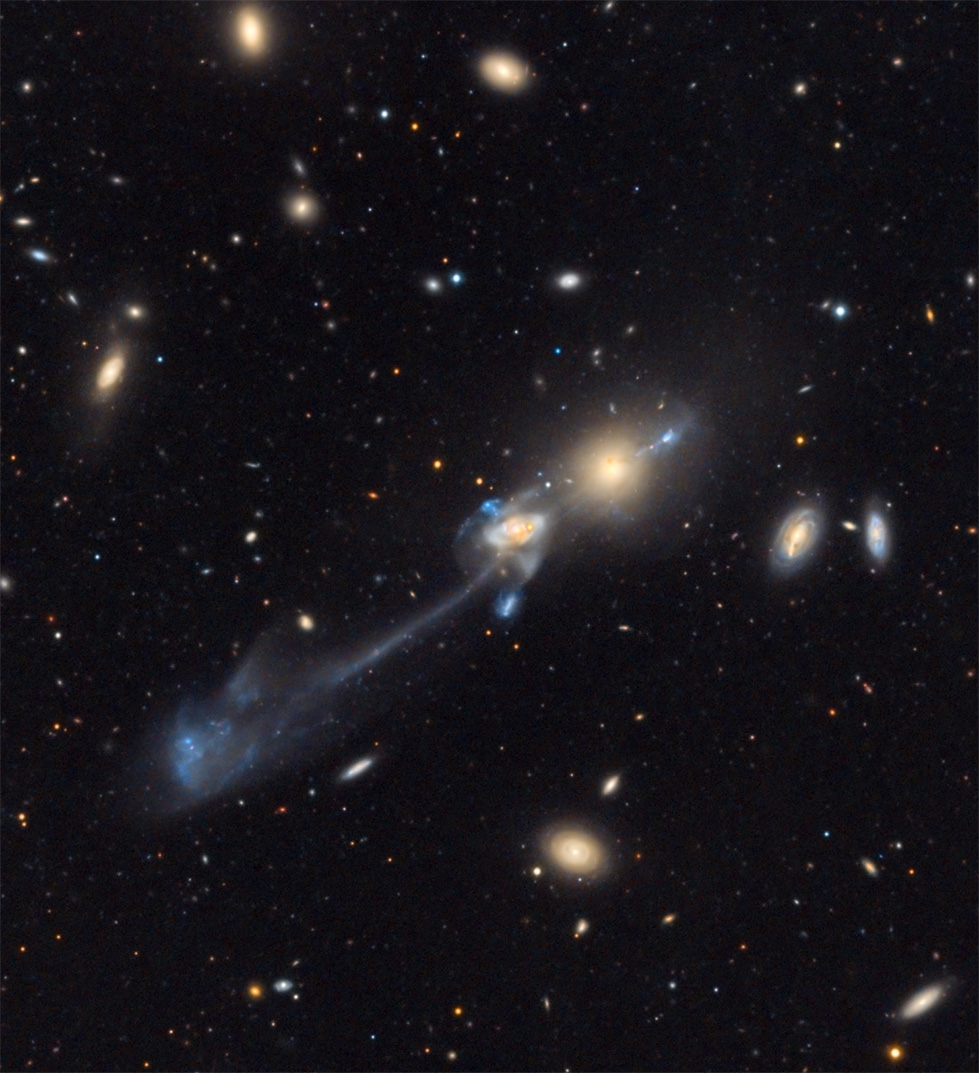
NGC 3561, which is part of this galaxy cluster, with the Schulman 0.8m Telescope on the Mount Lemmon Observatory
