= NGC 3552 =

Galaxy in the constellation Ursa Major

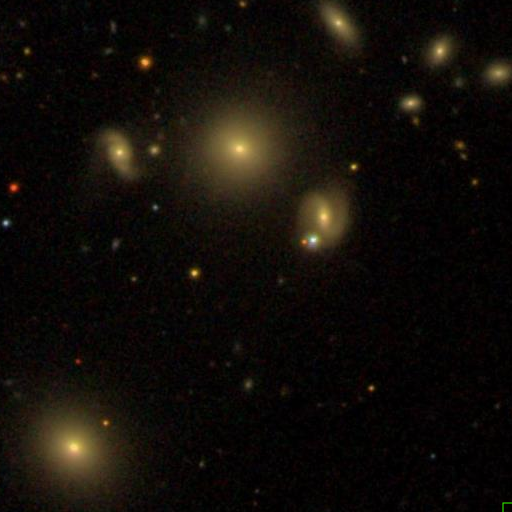
- SDSS image of NGC 3552 (red arrow)

Observation data (J2000 epoch)
- Constellation: Ursa Major
- Right ascension: 11^{h} 10^{m} 42.843^{s}
- Declination: +28° 41′ 34.82″
- Redshift: 0.03317
- Heliocentric radial velocity: 9779 km/s
- Group or cluster: Abell 1185
- Apparent magnitude (V): 14.3
- Apparent magnitude (B): 15.1

Characteristics
- Type: E-S0
- Size: ~134,000 ly (41.09 kpc) (estimated)
- Apparent size (V): 0.7′ × 0.7′

Other designations
- MCG +05-27-003, PGC 33932, CGCG 155-085 NED01

NGC 3552 is a lenticular galaxy in the constellation Ursa Major. It was discovered on April 11, 1785 by William Herschel. It is a member of the galaxy cluster Abell 1185.

One supernova has been observed in NGC 3552: SN 2025fxi (Type Ia, mag. 17.756) was discovered by ATLAS on March 27, 2025.

== See also ==
- List of NGC objects (3001–4000)
