= NGC 1435 =

Diffuse reflection nebula within the Pleiades

Reflection nebula
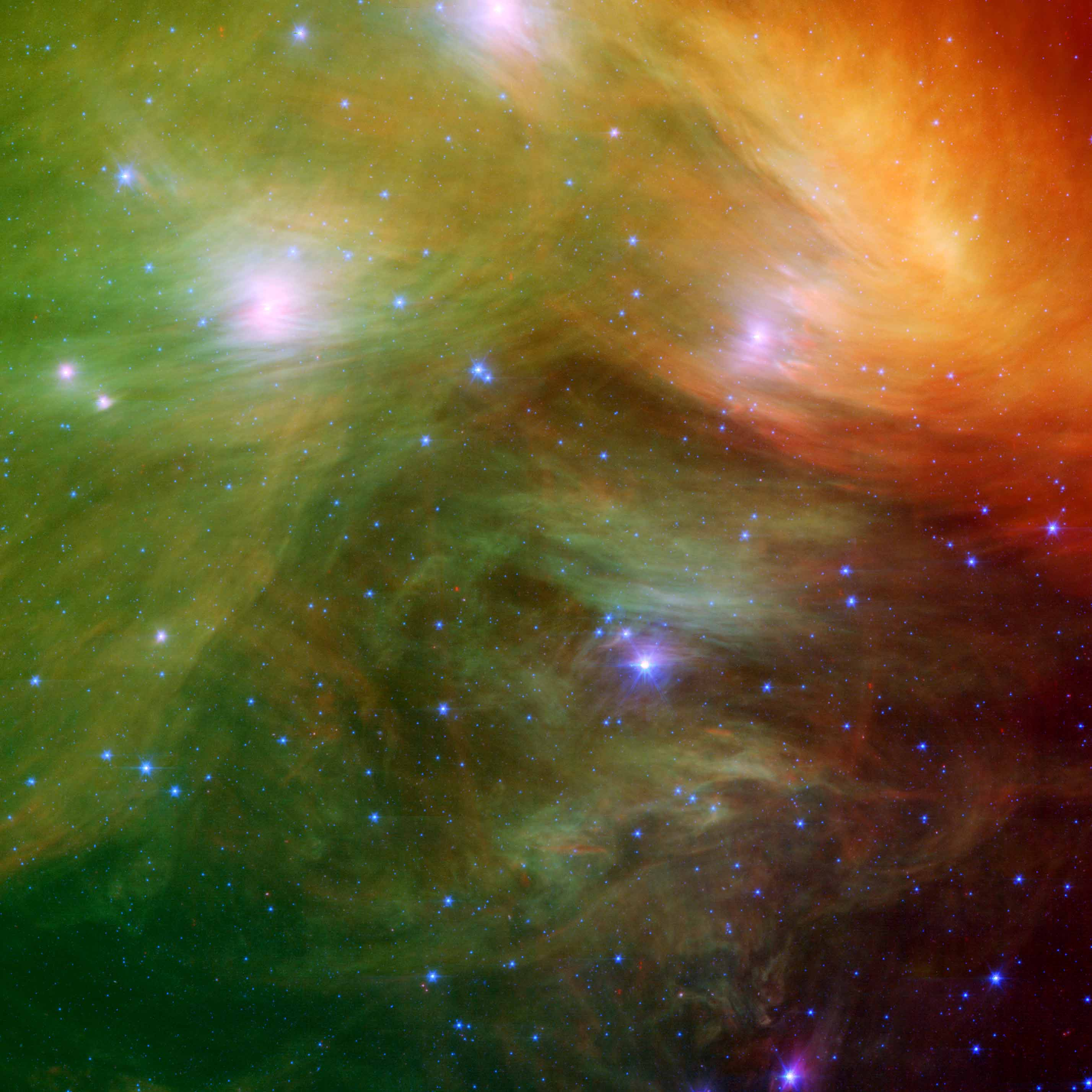
- The Merope Nebula and surrounding nebulosity in Pleiades, taken by the Spitzer Space Telescope

Observation data: J2000 epoch
- Right ascension: 03^{h} 46^{m}
- Declination: +23° 54′
- Distance: 440 ly (130 pc)
- Apparent magnitude (V): 13 (IC 349)
- Apparent dimensions (V): 30′
- Constellation: Taurus

Physical characteristics
- Radius: 2 ly
- Absolute magnitude (V): 8
- Notable features: In Pleiades; contains IC 349
- Designations: NGC 1435, Merope Nebula, Tempel's Nebula

The Merope Nebula (also known as Tempel's Nebula and NGC 1435) is a diffuse reflection nebula in the Pleiades star cluster, surrounding the 4th magnitude star Merope. It was discovered on October 19, 1859 by the German astronomer Wilhelm Tempel. The discovery was made using a 10.5 cm refractor. John Herschel included it as 768 in his General Catalogue of Nebulae and Clusters of Stars but never observed it himself.

The Merope Nebula has an apparent magnitude starting at 13 and quickly dimming by a factor of about 15, making most of the nebula dimmer than magnitude 16. It is illuminated entirely by the star Merope, which is embedded in the nebula. It contains a bright knot, IC 349, about half an arcminute wide near Merope, which was discovered by Edward Emerson Barnard in November 1890. It is naturally very bright but is almost hidden in the radiance of Merope. It appears blue in photographs because of the fine carbon dust spread throughout the cloud. Though it was once thought the Pleiades formed from this and surrounding nebulae, it is now known that the Pleiades nebulosity is caused by a chance encounter with the cloud.

== Gallery ==
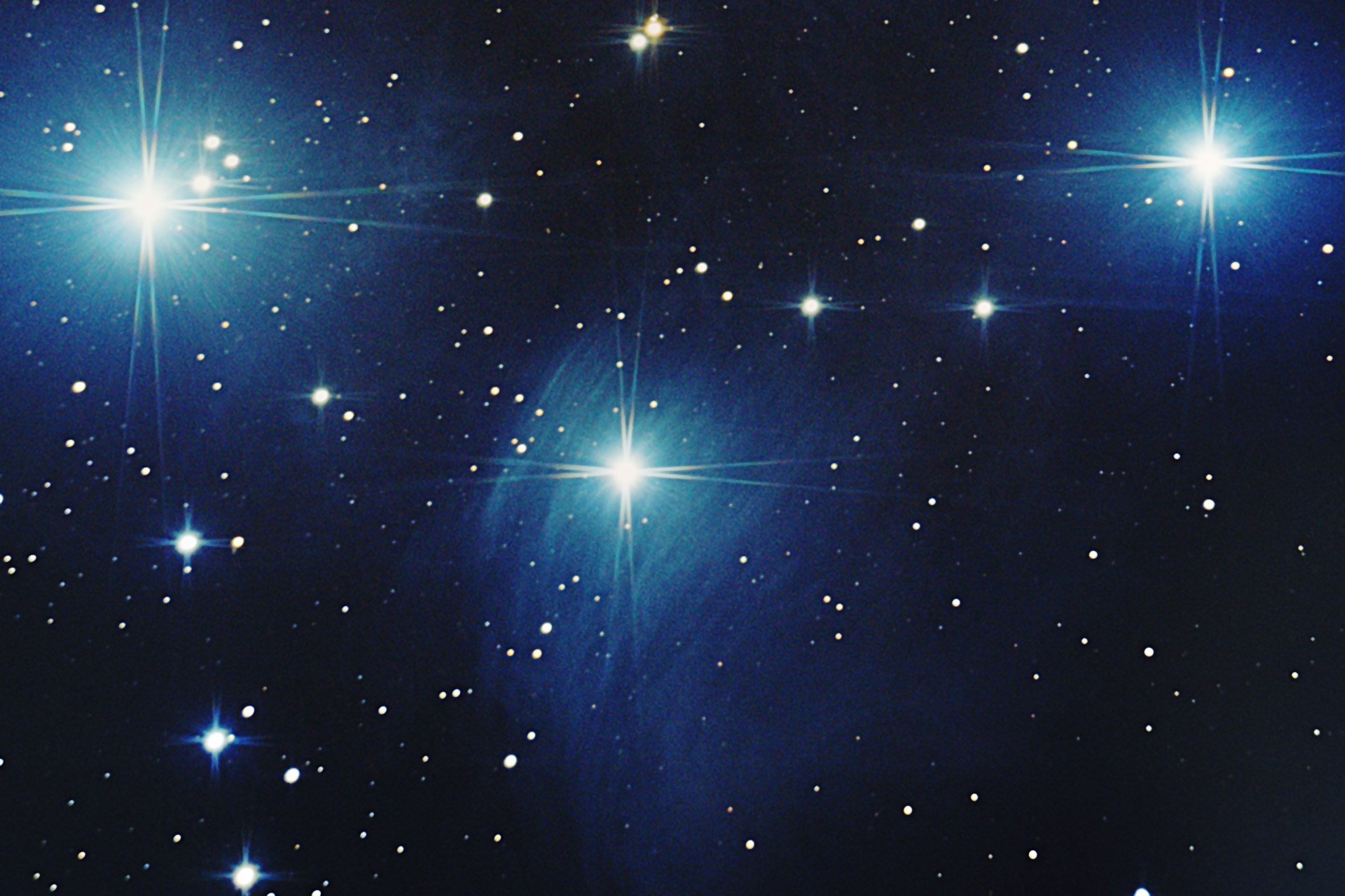
The Merope Nebula in true colour from an amateur telescope

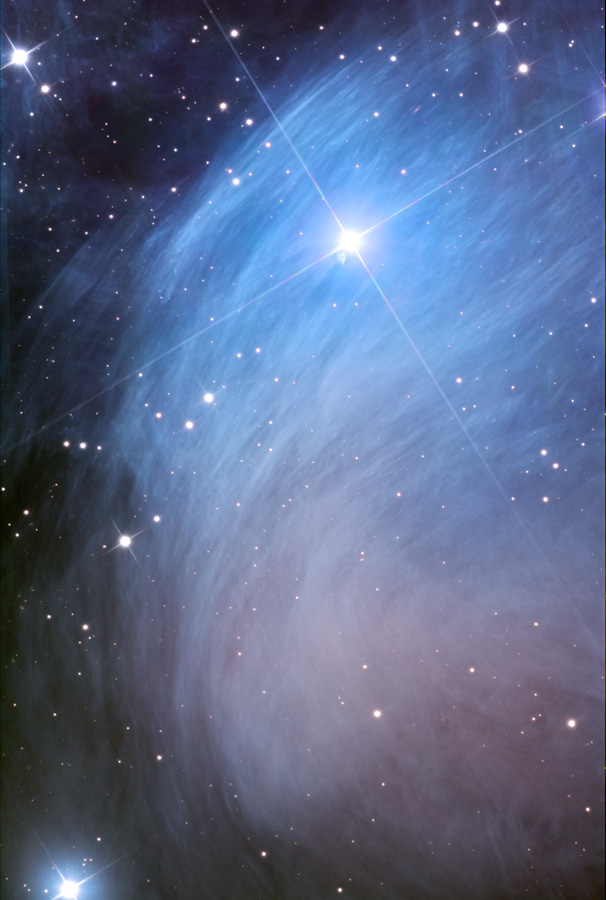
The Merope Nebula surrounding the star Merope
