= Lazarus comet =

A Lazarus comet is a small body within the main asteroid belt that is not an asteroid, but a comet that has been trapped and may be re-energized into being a live comet. They are referred to more formally as asteroid belt comets, or ABC. Astronomers are referring to this region of the asteroid belt as a comet graveyard, but calling these comets "Lazarus" because of their potential to be "resurrected".

== See also ==
- List of astronomical objects named after people
