= 439 Ohio =

Main-belt asteroid

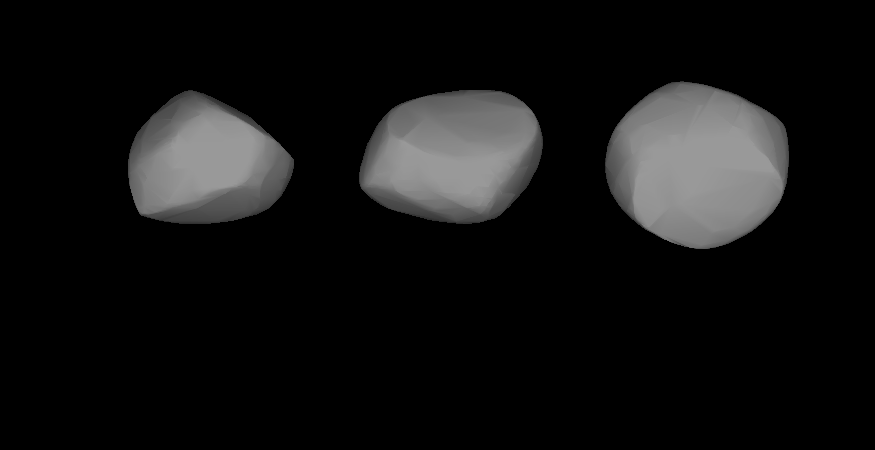
- Lightcurve-base 3D-model of 439 Ohio.

Discovery
- Discovered by: E. F. Coddington
- Discovery date: October 13, 1898

Designations
- Pronunciation: /oʊˈhaɪ.oʊ/
- Alternative designations: 1898 EB
- Minor planet category: Main belt

Orbital characteristics
- Epoch July 31, 2016 (JD 2457600.5)
- Uncertainty parameter 0
- Observation arc: 117.46 yr (42903 d)
- Aphelion: 3.32739 AU (497.770 Gm)
- Perihelion: 2.93686 AU (439.348 Gm)
- Semi-major axis: 3.13212 AU (468.558 Gm)
- Eccentricity: 0.062342
- Orbital period (sidereal): 5.54 yr (2024.7 d)
- Mean anomaly: 35.2583°
- Mean motion: 0° 10^{m} 40.102^{s} / day
- Inclination: 19.1544°
- Longitude of ascending node: 201.562°
- Argument of perihelion: 241.820°

Physical characteristics
- Mean diameter: 74+3 −8 km
- Synodic rotation period: 37.46726±0.00005 h
- Pole ecliptic longitude: 308° ± 50°
- Pole ecliptic latitude: −61° ± 7°
- Geometric albedo: 0.027±0.004
- Absolute magnitude (H): 9.82

439 Ohio is a large main belt asteroid.

It was discovered by E. F. Coddington on October 13, 1898, at Mount Hamilton, California. It was first of his total of three asteroid discoveries. The object is named for the U.S. state of Ohio.
