= 440 Theodora =

Main-belt asteroid

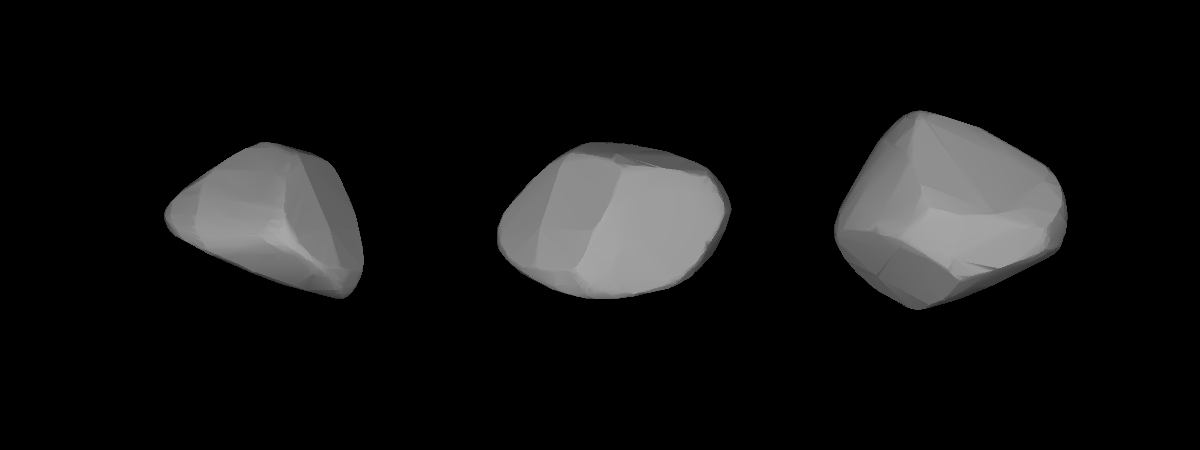
- A three-dimensional model of 440 Theodora based on its light curve

Discovery
- Discovered by: E. F. Coddington
- Discovery date: 13 October 1898

Designations
- Pronunciation: /θiːəˈdɔːrə/
- Alternative designations: 1898 EC
- Minor planet category: Main belt

Orbital characteristics
- Epoch 31 July 2016 (JD 2457600.5)
- Uncertainty parameter 0
- Observation arc: 117.50 yr (42917 d)
- Aphelion: 2.44735 AU (366.118 Gm)
- Perihelion: 1.97352 AU (295.234 Gm)
- Semi-major axis: 2.21043 AU (330.676 Gm)
- Eccentricity: 0.10718
- Orbital period (sidereal): 3.29 yr (1200.4 d)
- Mean anomaly: 224.670°
- Mean motion: 0° 17^{m} 59.669^{s} / day
- Inclination: 1.59566°
- Longitude of ascending node: 292.133°
- Argument of perihelion: 179.039°

Physical characteristics
- Dimensions: 13.6 km
- Synodic rotation period: 4.828 h (0.2012 d)
- Geometric albedo: 0.630
- Absolute magnitude (H): 11.6

440 Theodora is a small Main belt asteroid.

It was discovered by E. F. Coddington on October 13, 1898, at Mount Hamilton. It was his second asteroid discovery.
