= Leo Supercluster =

Galaxy supercluster

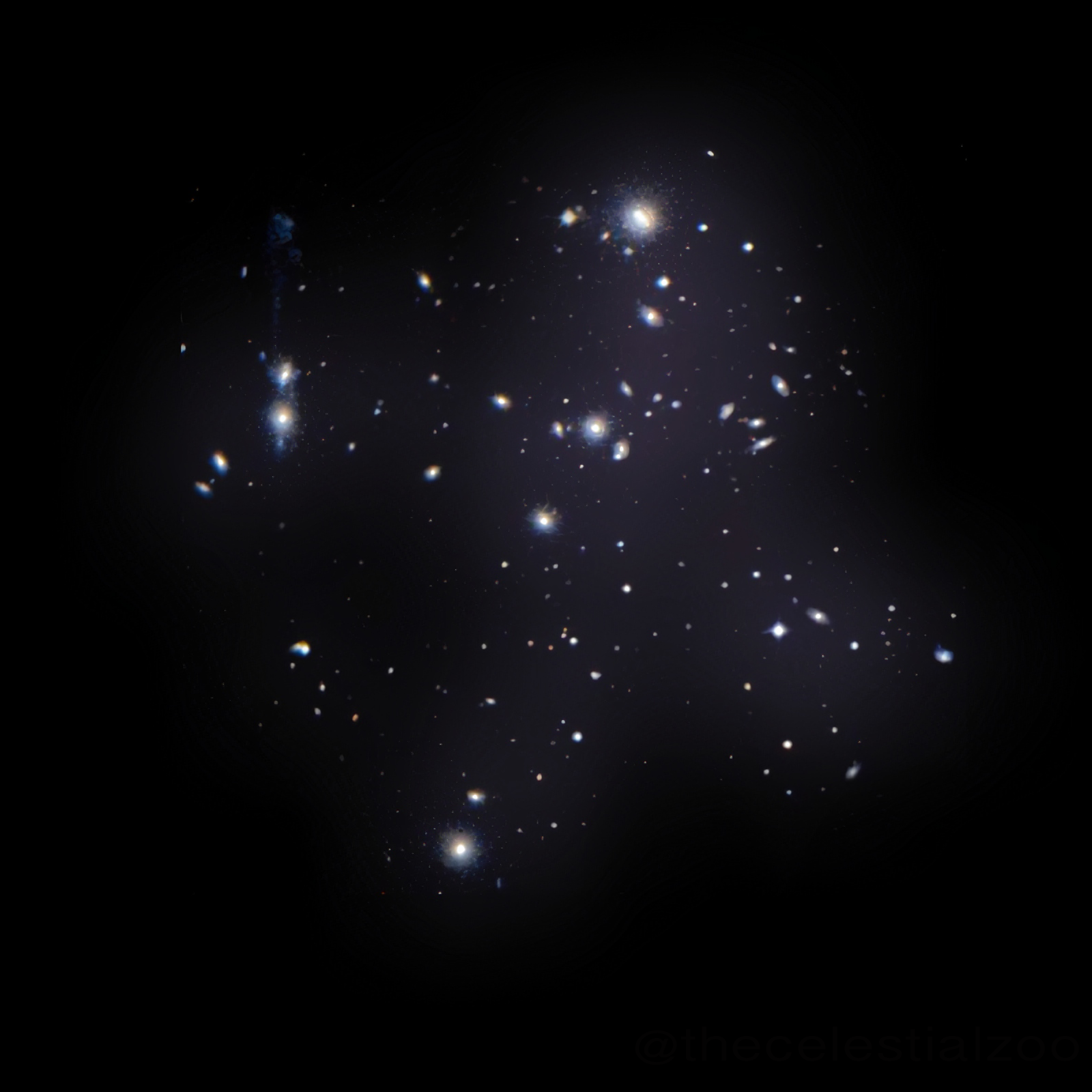
- Leo Supercluster as seen from Earth with its component galaxies and intergalactic halo.

Observation data (Epoch )
- Constellation(s): Ursa Major, Leo
- Brightest member: Abell 1185
- Major axis: 130 megaparsecs
- Minor axis: 60 megaparsecs
- Redshift: 0.037

The Leo Supercluster is a supercluster in the northern celestial hemisphere that stretches across the constellations Ursa Major and Leo. It covers an area approximately 130 megaparsecs long by 60 megaparsecs wide. The redshifts of member galaxy clusters range from 0.032 to 0.043. The brightest cluster in the system is Abell 1185.

== Members ==
Leo Supercluster (SCL 93) consists of 10 galaxy cluster members, which are Abell 999, Abell 1016, Abell 1139, Abell 1142, Abell 1177, Abell 1185, Abell 1228, Abell 1257, Abell 1267, Abell 1314.

== See also ==
- Abell catalog
- Large scale structure of the universe
- List of Abell clusters
- List of superclusters
