= Merope (star) =

B-type subgiant star in the constellation Taurus

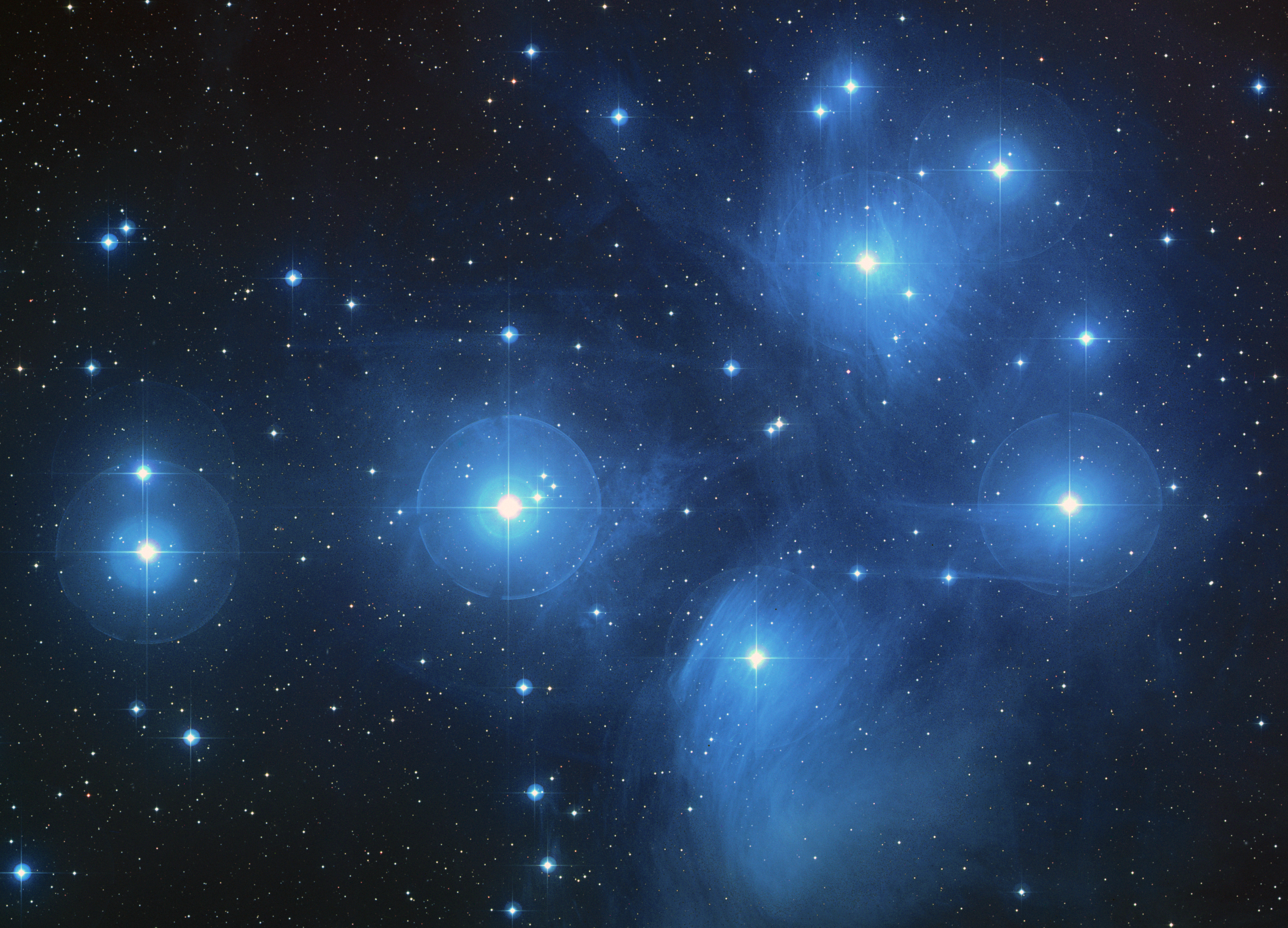
- Merope in the Pleiades cluster (circled)

Observation data Epoch J2000 Equinox ICRS
- Constellation: Taurus
- Right ascension: 03^{h} 46^{m} 19.5859^{s}
- Declination: +23° 56′ 54.092″
- Apparent magnitude (V): 4.18

Characteristics
- Spectral type: B6IV(e)
- U−B color index: −0.41
- B−V color index: −0.06
- Variable type: β Cephei

Astrometry
Radial velocity (R_{v})	6.2 km/s
Proper motion (μ)	RA: 13.075 mas/yr Dec.: −48.404 mas/yr
Parallax (π)	7.0670±0.2862 mas
Distance	460 ± 20 ly (142 ± 6 pc)
Absolute magnitude (M_{V})	−1.29

Details
Mass	4.25 M_{☉}
Radius	4.79±0.17 R_{☉}
Luminosity	927 L_{☉}
Surface gravity (log g)	3.48 cgs
Temperature	14,550 K
Rotational velocity (v sin i)	240 km/s
Age	212 Myr

Other designations
- Merope, 23 Tau, V971 Tauri, HR 1156, BD+23°522, HD 23480, HIP 17608, SAO 76172, GC 4512, CCDM J03463+2357A

Database references
SIMBAD	data

Merope /ˈmɛrəpiː/, designated 23 Tauri (abbreviated 23 Tau), is a star in the constellation of Taurus and a member of the Pleiades star cluster. It is approximately 440 light-years (135 pc) away.

== Distance ==
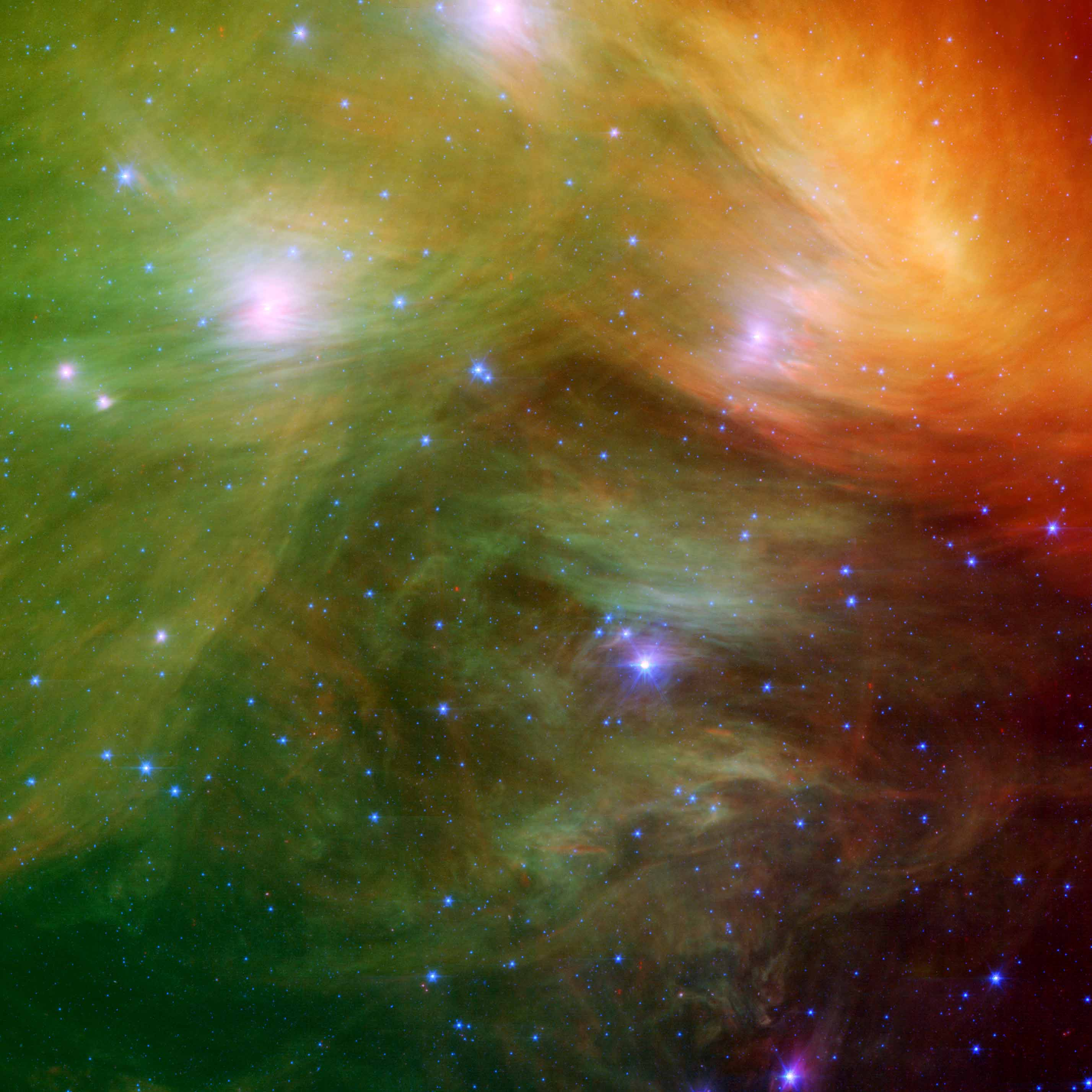
Nebulosity NGC 1435 around Merope (Spitzer false-colour infrared image)

Despite being one of the closest star clusters to Earth, the distance to the Pleiades and its member stars is still in dispute. The parallax of Merope itself is not known precisely enough to give an accurate distance. Its Hipparcos parallax has a statistical margin of error of about 5% and gave a distance 116 parsecs. This, and an overall distance to the Pleiades calculated from Hipparcos parallaxes of 120 parsecs, are inconsistent with other parallax measurements such as from Gaia. Merope is too bright for Gaia to have a reliable parallax for it, but calculations of the overall distance to the Pleiades cluster using Hipparcos, Gaia, Hubble Space Telescope, and other methods repeatedly show that the Hipparcos parallaxes suffered from some kind of systemic error, and the distance to the Pleiades is most likely around 135 parsecs.

== Description ==
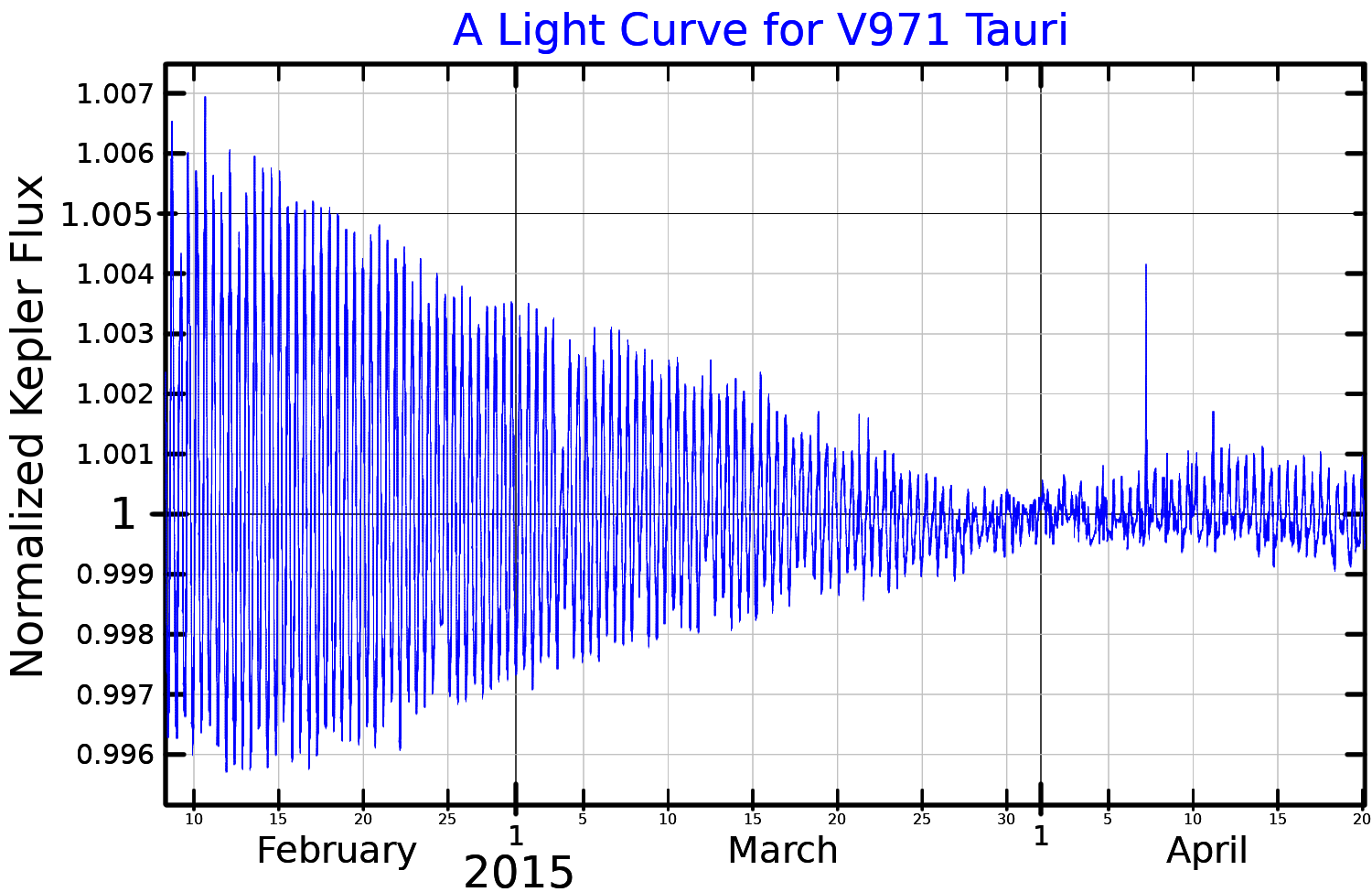
A light curve for V971 Tauri (Merope), adapted from White et al. (2017)

Merope is a blue-white B-type subgiant with a mean apparent magnitude of +4.18. Richard Hinckley Allen described the star as lucid white and violet. It has a luminosity 927 times that of the Sun and a surface temperature of 14,550 K. Merope's mass is roughly 4.25 M_{☉} and has a radius 4.8 times as great as the Sun's.

In 1985, Bernard J. McNamara announced that the brightness of Merope varies as a function of time. Merope is classified as a Beta Cephei variable, a type of hot variable star which pulsates regularly due to opacity changes in its atmosphere. Its brightness varies by up to 0.01 magnitudes during each pulsation cycle. It is given the variable star designation of V971 Tauri. The period of variability is stable at 0.49 days, although the amplitude of the brightness changes on each cycle varies.

Some papers have reported a companion star to Merope, at a separation of 250 mas, as well as several other visual companions farther out. These possible companions have not been confirmed.

Surrounding Merope is the Merope Nebula (NGC 1435). It appears brightest around Merope and is listed in the Index Catalogue as number IC 349.

== Nomenclature ==
23 Tauri is the star's Flamsteed designation. The name Merope originates with Greek mythology; she is one of the seven daughters of Atlas and Pleione known as the Pleiades. In 2016, the International Astronomical Union organized a Working Group on Star Names (WGSN) to catalog and standardize proper names for stars. The WGSN's first bulletin of July 2016 included a table of the first two batches of names approved by the WGSN; which included Merope for this star. It is now so entered in the IAU Catalog of Star Names.
