= 445 Edna =

Main-belt asteroid

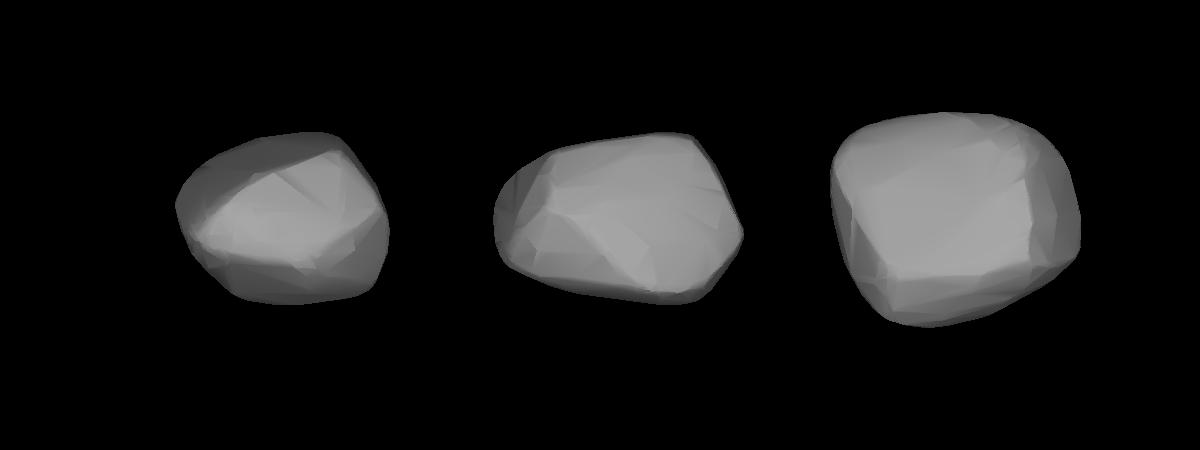
- Lightcurve-base 3D-model of 445 Edna.

Discovery
- Discovered by: E. F. Coddington
- Discovery date: 2 October 1899

Designations
- Pronunciation: /ˈɛdnə/
- Alternative designations: 1899 EX
- Minor planet category: Main belt

Orbital characteristics
- Epoch 31 July 2016 (JD 2457600.5)
- Uncertainty parameter 0
- Observation arc: 116.53 yr (42563 d)
- Aphelion: 3.82552 AU (572.290 Gm)
- Perihelion: 2.57569 AU (385.318 Gm)
- Semi-major axis: 3.20060 AU (478.803 Gm)
- Eccentricity: 0.19525
- Orbital period (sidereal): 5.73 yr (2091.4 d)
- Mean anomaly: 190.102°
- Mean motion: 0° 10^{m} 19.668^{s} / day
- Inclination: 21.2944°
- Longitude of ascending node: 292.111°
- Argument of perihelion: 81.2763°

Physical characteristics
- Dimensions: 86.3 ± 8.28 km (composite estimate); 87.17±2.1 km
- Mass: (5.69±0.15)×10^{17} kg (2025) (Note: Calculated from its standard gravitational parameter GM = 0.038±0.001 km^{3}/s^{2}.) (5.24±0.11)×10^{17} kg (2023); 3.78+0.17 −0.18×10^{17} kg (2022) (Note: Calculated in kilograms from its value in solar masses: 1.903+0.085 −0.090×10^{−13} M_{☉}.)
- Mean density: 1.60 g/cm^{3} (2025) (Note: Assuming a diameter of 87.8 km.); 1.51±0.19 g/cm^{3} (2023) (Note: Assuming a diameter of 87.2 ± 3.7 km.); 1.12±0.33 g/cm^{3} (2022) (Note: Assuming a diameter of 86.3 ± 8.28 km.)
- Synodic rotation period: 19.97 h (0.832 d)
- Geometric albedo: 0.0447±0.002
- Absolute magnitude (H): 9.29

445 Edna is a large main belt asteroid.

It was discovered by E. F. Coddington on October 2, 1899, at Mount Hamilton, California. It was the astronomer's third and final asteroid discovery.
