= C/1898 L1 (Coddington–Pauly) =

Parabolic comet

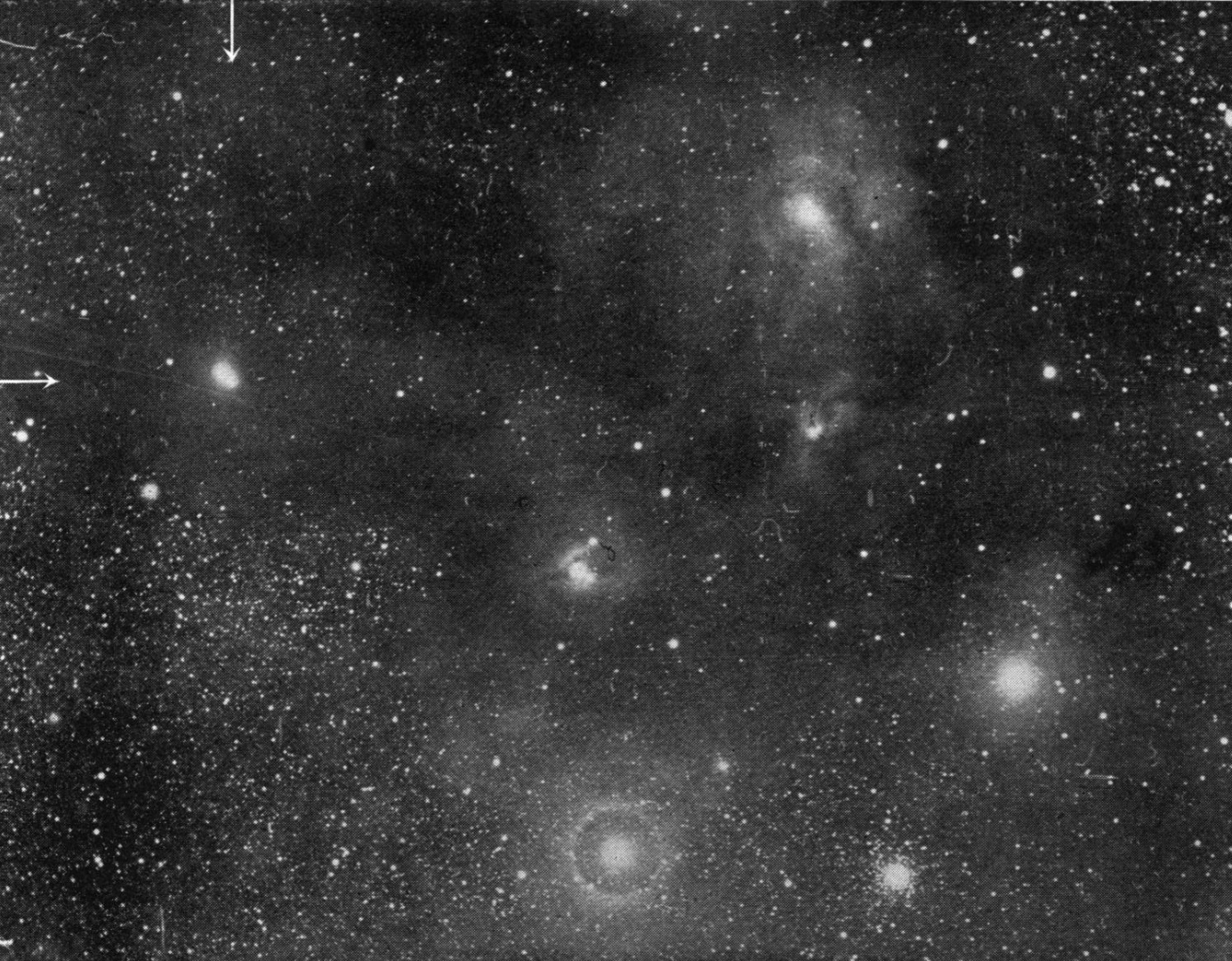
- Discovery photograph of Comet Coddington–Pauly (arrows) taken by Edwin F. Coddington from the Lick Observatory on 10 June 1898.

Discovery
- Discovered by: Edwin F. Coddington; Wolfgang Pauly
- Discovery site: Lick Observatory, USA; Bucharest, Romania
- Discovery date: 10–14 June 1898

Designations
- Alternative designations: 1898 VII, 1898c

Orbital characteristics
- Epoch: 12 August 1898 (JD 2414513.5)
- Observation arc: 541 days (1.48 years)
- Number of observations: 130
- Perihelion: 1.702 AU
- Eccentricity: 1.00098
- Max. orbital speed: 32.3 km/s
- Inclination: 69.935°
- Longitude of ascending node: 75.408°
- Argument of periapsis: 233.27°
- Last perihelion: 14 September 1898
- Earth MOID: 0.948 AU
- Jupiter MOID: 1.252 AU

Physical characteristics
- Comet total magnitude (M1): 5.0
- Comet nuclear magnitude (M2): 7.7
- Apparent magnitude: 9.0 (1898 apparition)

Comet Coddington–Pauly, formally designated as C/1898 L1, is a non-periodic comet that was visible through telescopes between 1898 and 1899. It is the second comet ever discovered through photography (after 206P/Barnard–Boattini), (Note: Contemporary sources note C/1898 L1 as the third comet discovered photographically after a supposed "comet-like" object spotted by J. Martin Schaeberle during the solar eclipse of April 16, 1893. However, it turned out to be a disconnected coronal mass ejection rather than being an actual comet itself.) and the only comet discovered by astronomers Edwin Foster Coddington and Wolfgang Pauly, respectively.

== Discovery and observations ==
Edwin Foster Coddington made a 2-hour exposure of the Rho Ophiuchi cloud complex on the night of 10 June 1898, however the plates weren't developed until two days later. There he found a "strong nebulous trail" only about 2–3 degrees north of the star Antares, (Note: On the night of 12 June 1898, W. J. Hussey reported the comet's position on the following coordinates: α = 16^{h} 24.9^{m} , δ = –25° 14′) where his colleague, William J. Hussey, confirmed it was a comet. It was later discovered independently by Romanian astronomer, Wolfgang Pauly, while observing the Messier 4 globular cluster on 14 June 1898.
