= NGC 3550 =

Galaxy in the constellation Ursa Major

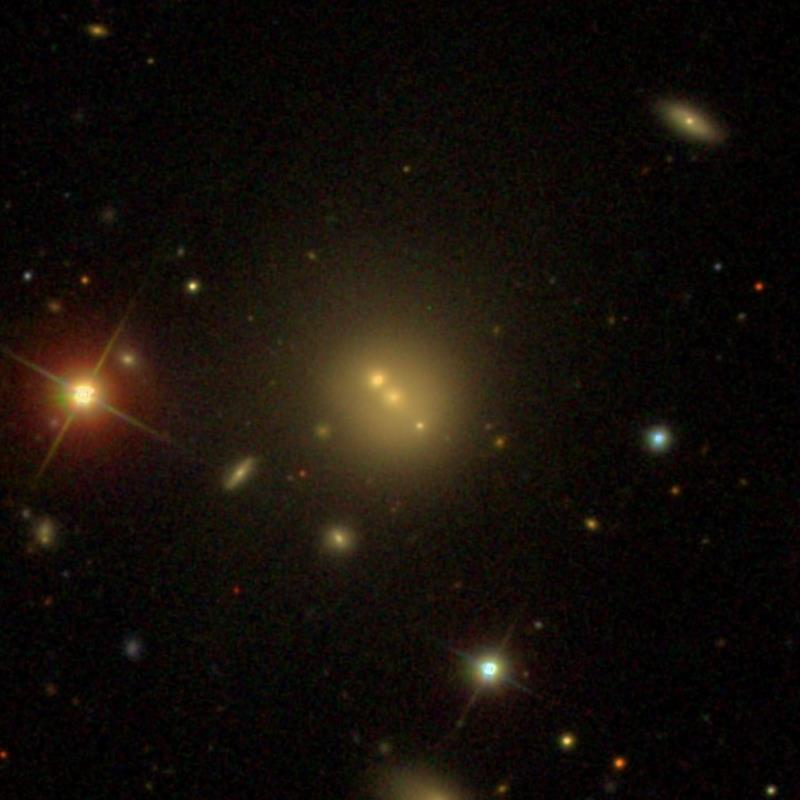
- SDSS image of NGC 3550

Observation data (J2000 epoch)
- Constellation: Ursa Major
- Right ascension: 11^{h} 10^{m} 38.26^{s}
- Declination: +28° 46′ 02.2″
- Redshift: 0.035094
- Heliocentric radial velocity: 10336 km/s
- Distance: 490 Mly (150 Mpc)
- Apparent magnitude (V): 13.22
- Apparent magnitude (B): 14.12

Characteristics
- Type: S0

Other designations
- UGC 6214, PGC 33927

NGC 3550 is a lenticular galaxy in the constellation Ursa Major. It was discovered on April 11, 1785, by William Herschel. It is one of the brightest galaxies of the Abell 1185 galaxy cluster.
