= Víctor Manuel Blanco =

Puerto Rican astronomer

Víctor M. Blanco
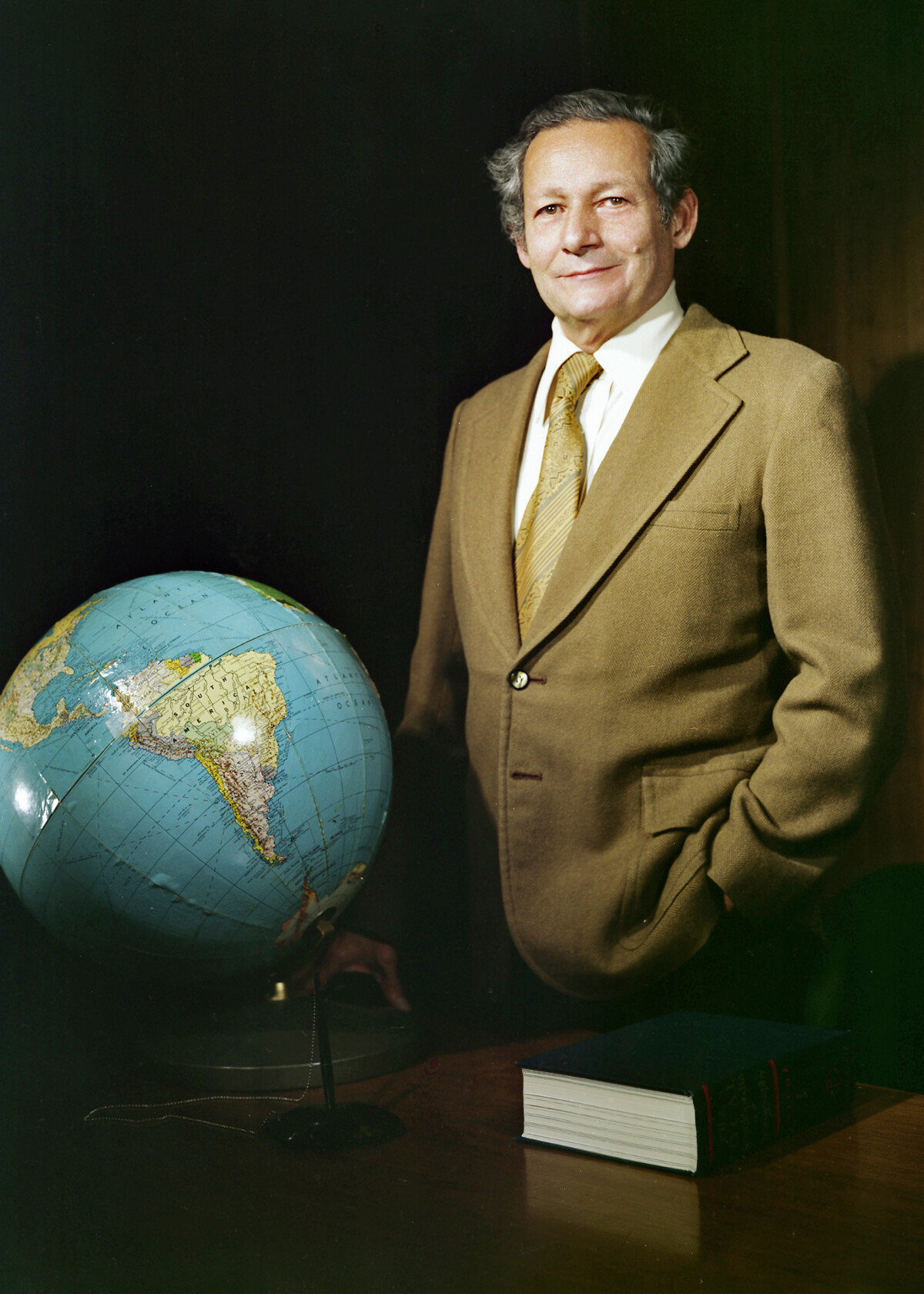
- Born: Víctor Manuel Blanco Pagán; March 10, 1918; Guayama, Puerto Rico
- Died: March 8, 2011 (aged 92); Vero Beach, Florida, U.S.
- Education: University of Puerto Rico; University of Chicago (BS); University of California, Berkeley (M.A., Ph.D.)
- Occupation: Astronomer
- Scientific career
- Workplaces: University of Puerto Rico; United States Naval Observatory; UNESCO; Case Institute of Technology; Cerro Tololo Inter-American Observatory
- Thesis: Luminosity Function and Space Distribution of A0 Stars (1949)
- Doctoral advisor: Robert Julius Trumpler
- Military career
- Allegiance: United States of America
- Branch: United States Army Air Forces
- Service years: 1940–1946
- Conflicts: World War II

Víctor Manuel Blanco (March 10, 1918 – March 8, 2011) was a Puerto Rican astronomer who in 1959 discovered Blanco 1, a stellar cluster. Blanco was the second Director of the Cerro Tololo Inter-American Observatory in Chile, which had the largest telescope in the Southern Hemisphere at the time. In 1995, the 4-meter telescope was dedicated in his honor and named the Víctor M. Blanco Telescope; it is also known as the "Blanco 4m."

== Early years ==
Blanco (birth name: Víctor Manuel Blanco Pagán) was one of nine siblings born in the town of Guayama, Puerto Rico to Felipe Blanco, a policeman, and Adelfa Pagan de Blanco, a housewife. He received his primary and secondary education in his hometown. As a child, Blanco would often wonder about the stars and built a backyard telescope, thus his interest in astronomy. He entered the University of Puerto Rico to study medicine but, after some time at the university, Blanco decided to study astronomy and moved to the city of Chicago. He entered the University of Chicago, but was drafted into the military before he finished college.

== World War II ==
During World War II, Blanco served in the US Army Air Force in the Pacific Theater. His duties in the military required that he repair and tune radar detectors. This permitted him to study atmospheric effects on radar waves. After being discharged from the military, he was granted college credit for his wartime work, and returned briefly to the University of Chicago where he earned a Bachelor of Science degree.

== Career as an astronomer ==
Blanco was employed by the University of Puerto Rico as an assistant professor of astrometry, until he was recruited in 1948 to assist in polishing, calibrating and maintaining the mirrors of the 200-inch Hale Telescope in California. He entered the University of California, Berkeley, where he continued his studies and earned his master's degree and, in 1949, his Doctorate in astronomy. In 1949, he returned to Puerto Rico and reassumed his duties at the University of Puerto Rico.

Blanco later served as the Director of the Astrometry and Astrophysics Division of the United States Naval Observatory. The U.S. Naval Observatory (USNO) provides a wide range of astronomical data and products, and serves as the official source of time for the U.S. Department of Defense and the standard of time for the entire United States. He also served in Java, Indonesia for UNESCO in the position of astronomer.

== Accomplishments ==
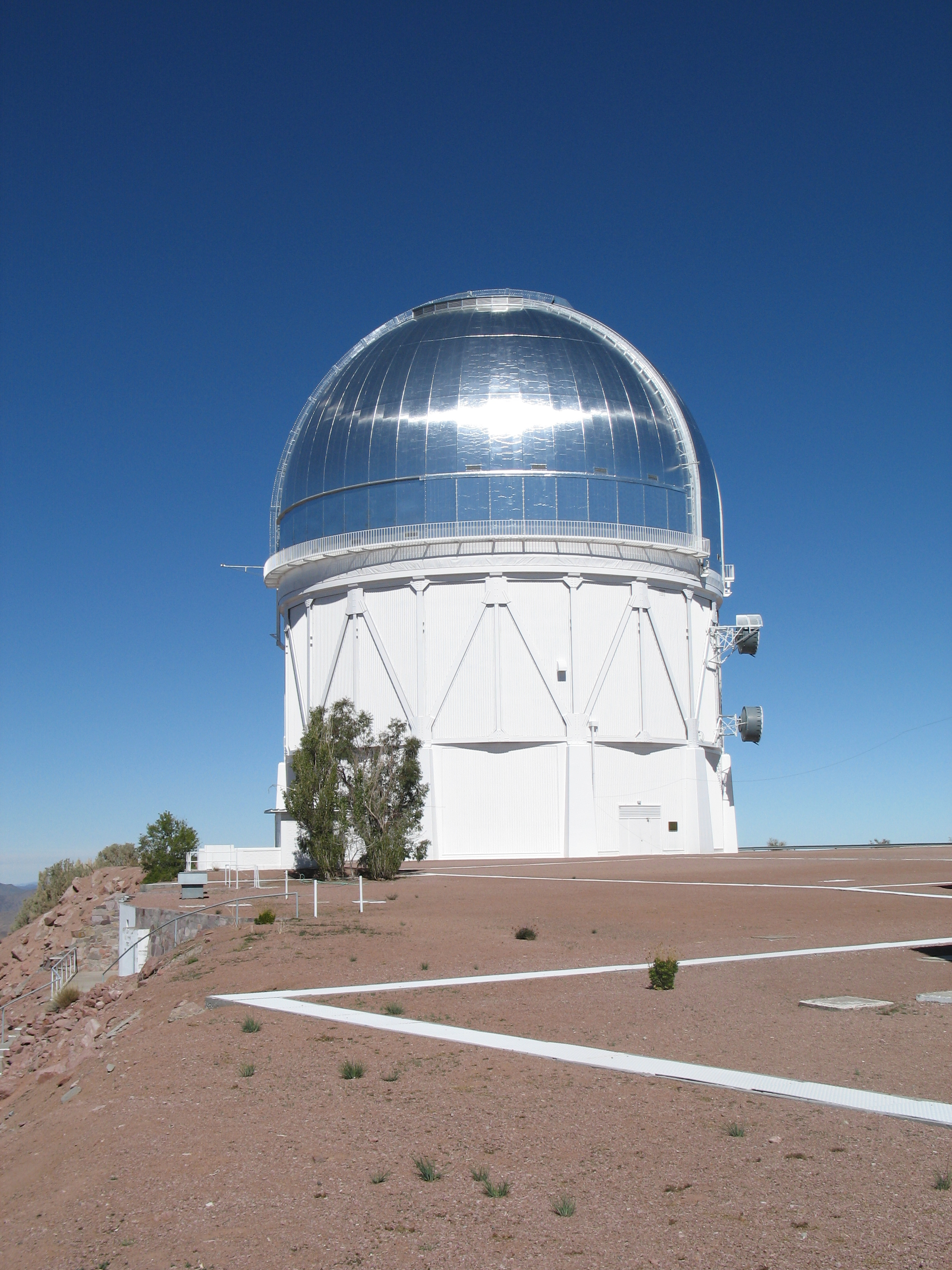
The Víctor M. Blanco Telescope, also known as "The Blanco 4m"

In 1959, while serving as a professor of astrophysics at the Case Institute of Technology (renamed Case Western Reserve University in 1967) in Cleveland, Ohio, Blanco discovered an open cluster. It was named Blanco 1 in his honor, and is centered on the blue star Zeta Sculptoris. According to The Monthly Notices of the Royal Astronomical Society, Blanco 1 exhibits subsolar ratios that are not observed among nearby field stars. Together with his wife Betty, Blanco and Martin McCarthy conducted pioneering research into the stellar population in the central regions of our galaxy, and in the Magellanic Clouds. They discovered the change in the ratio of carbon stars to M-type stars from the nuclear bulge of our galaxy, in relation to both Large Magellanic Clouds and Small Magellanic Clouds.

In July 1967, Blanco became the second director of the Cerro Tololo Inter-American Observatory (CTIO). Located in Cerro Tololo mountain, Chile and founded in 1963, it is part of the National (U.S.) Optical Astronomy Observatory known as "NOAO." Blanco assembled the scientific, engineering, and technical staff from scratch.

When Blanco arrived at CTIO, there was a 60-inch telescope in operation. During his tenure the University of Michigan's 0.6-m Curtis Schmidt moved there in 1967, CTIO installed a 0.9-m reflector in 1967 and a 1.5-m reflector in 1968, and Yale University's 1-m reflector was installed there in 1973.

In addition to these university installations, Blanco played a central role in persuading various agencies to participate in the construction of a four-meter telescope. During its construction, Blanco personally oversaw the alignment and calibration of the telescope. The telescope, which is the southern twin of the four-meter instrument at Kitt Peak National Observatory, opened in 1974. This four-meter telescope (also known as a "4-m") became the most productive telescope in the Southern Hemisphere.

As director of CTIO, Blanco also maintained excellent relations with the Chilean astronomical community and the Chilean public at large. His tenure spanned the presidencies of Eduardo Frei Montalva, Salvador Allende, and Augusto Pinochet. Blanco was director of CTIO until 1981, when he was succeeded by Osmer.

== Honors ==
Telescopio Víctor M. Blanco

En reconocimiento a los años de destacada labor y servicio en Cerro Tololo.

In appreciation for many years of outstanding leadership and service at CTIO.

On 8 September 1995, in a well-attended mountaintop ceremony, the CTIO 4-m telescope was officially named the Víctor M. Blanco Telescope, also known as "The Blanco 4m." Amongst its many uses, this telescope is used to study cosmic acceleration - the possibility that our universe is expanding at an accelerating rate. At the main entrance to the building a large bronze plaque reads, in both Spanish and English (see adjunct box).

Asteroid 9550 Victorblanco, discovered by American astronomer Edward Bowell at the Anderson Mesa Station in Arizona in 1985, was named in his honor. The official naming citation was published by the Minor Planet Center on 9 March 2001 (M.P.C. 42359). This main-belt asteroid measures approximately 12 kilometers in diameter and belongs to the main belt's background population.

== Written works and academic memberships ==
Blanco was the co-author of many articles in astrophysics including:

- Telescopes, Red Stars, and Chilean Skies, Annual Review of Astronomy and Astrophysics, Vol. 39: 1-18 (Volume publication date September 2001).
- Carbon stars, Revista Mexicana de Astronomía y Astrofísica (ISSN 0185-1101), vol. 19, Dec. 1989, p. 25-37.
- Late type giants in Large Magellanic Cloud, Nature 258, 407 - 408 (4 December 1975); doi:10.1038/258407a0.
- Basic Physics of the Solar System, V. M. Blanco and S. W. McCuskey. Addison-Wesley, Reading, Mass., 1961. xii + 307 pp.

He was a member of the International Astronomical Union in the following divisions:

- Division IX Commission 25 Stellar Photometry & Polarimetry
- Division VII Commission 33 Structure & Dynamics of the Galactic System
- Division IV Commission 45 Stellar Classification
- Division XII Commission 50 Protection of Existing & Potential Observatory Sites
- Division IV Stars
- Division VII Galactic System
- Division IX Optical & Infrared Techniques
- Division XII Union-Wide Activities

== Death ==
Blanco died on March 8, 2011, at Indian River Medical Center in Vero Beach, Florida. He was survived by his wife of 42 years, Betty Blanco; a son, Daniel Blanco; a stepson, David Mintz; and a stepdaughter, Elizabeth Vitell.

== See also ==
- List of Puerto Ricans
- Puerto Rican scientists and inventors
- Cerro Tololo Inter-American Observatory
- List of largest optical reflecting telescopes
- National Optical Astronomy Observatory
- Víctor M. Blanco Telescope
