= Zeta Sculptoris =

Star in the constellation Sculptor

ζ Sculptoris
- Location of ζ Sculptoris (circled)

Observation data Epoch J2000 Equinox ICRS
- Constellation: Sculptor
- Right ascension: 00^{h} 02^{m} 19.92035^{s}
- Declination: −29° 43′ 13.4873″
- Apparent magnitude (V): 5.04

Characteristics
- Spectral type: B5 V
- U−B color index: -0.55
- B−V color index: -0.16

Astrometry
Radial velocity (R_{v})	+8.6±1.6 km/s
Proper motion (μ)	RA: +9.34 mas/yr Dec.: +14.50 mas/yr
Parallax (π)	6.49±0.25 mas
Distance	500 ± 20 ly (154 ± 6 pc)
Absolute magnitude (M_{V})	−0.89

Orbit
Period (P)	1,740±22 d
Eccentricity (e)	0.316±0.043
Periastron epoch (T)	2453381 ± 37 JD
Argument of periastron (ω) (secondary)	43.5±6.9°
Semi-amplitude (K_{1}) (primary)	12.4±0.6 km/s

Details
Mass	5.5 M_{☉}
Luminosity	496 L_{☉}
Temperature	16,100 K
Metallicity [Fe/H]	0.00 dex
Rotation	1.75222 d
Rotational velocity (v sin i)	15 km/s

Other designations
- ζ Scl, CD−30°19790, FK5 3932, GC 33337, HD 224990, HIP 183, HR 9091, SAO 135551, CCDM J00023-2943AB, WDS J00023-2943AB, GSC 06418-01221

Database references
SIMBAD	data

Zeta Sculptoris, Latinized from ζ Sculptoris, is a multiple star system in the constellation Sculptor. It is faintly visible to the naked eye with an apparent magnitude of 5.04. The annual parallax shift is 6.49 mas, which yields a distance estimate of about 500 light years from the Sun. It is moving further away with a radial velocity of +8.6 km/s. Zeta Sculptoris is near the Blanco 1 cluster as viewed from Earth, although parallax measurements indicate it to be substantially closer.

The primary component, designated Zeta Sculptoris A, is a single-lined, low amplitude spectroscopic binary system with an orbital period of 4.8 years and an eccentricity of 0.32. The visible member of this pair is a B-type main-sequence star with a stellar classification of B5 V. It has a 13th magnitude companion, Zeta Sculptoris B, at an angular separation of 3 arcseconds along a position angle of 330° (as of 1927). According to Eggleton and Tokovinin (2008), it is most likely gravitationally bound to the primary component.
