= NGC 3554 =

Galaxy in the constellation Ursa Major

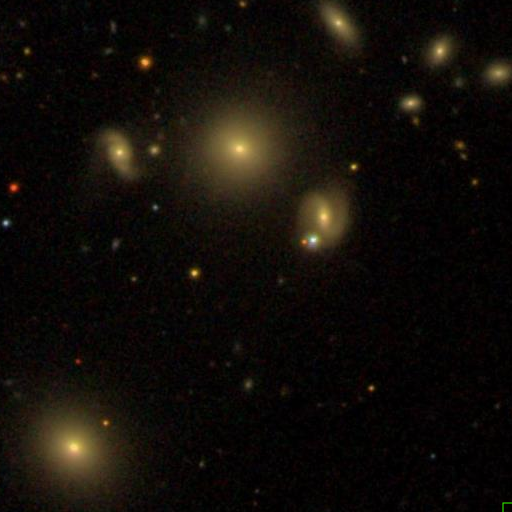
- SDSS image of NGC 3554 (bottom left)

Observation data (J2000 epoch)
- Constellation: Ursa Major
- Right ascension: 11^{h} 10^{m} 47.856^{s}
- Declination: 28° 39′ 36.81″
- Redshift: 0.02902
- Heliocentric radial velocity: 8574 km/s
- Distance: 409.6 Mly (125.57 Mpc)

Characteristics
- Type: E2

Other designations
- MCG +05-27-007, PGC 33948

NGC 3554 is an elliptical galaxy in the constellation Ursa Major. It was discovered in December 1827 by John Herschel.
