= 9io9 =

Galaxy in the constellation Cetus

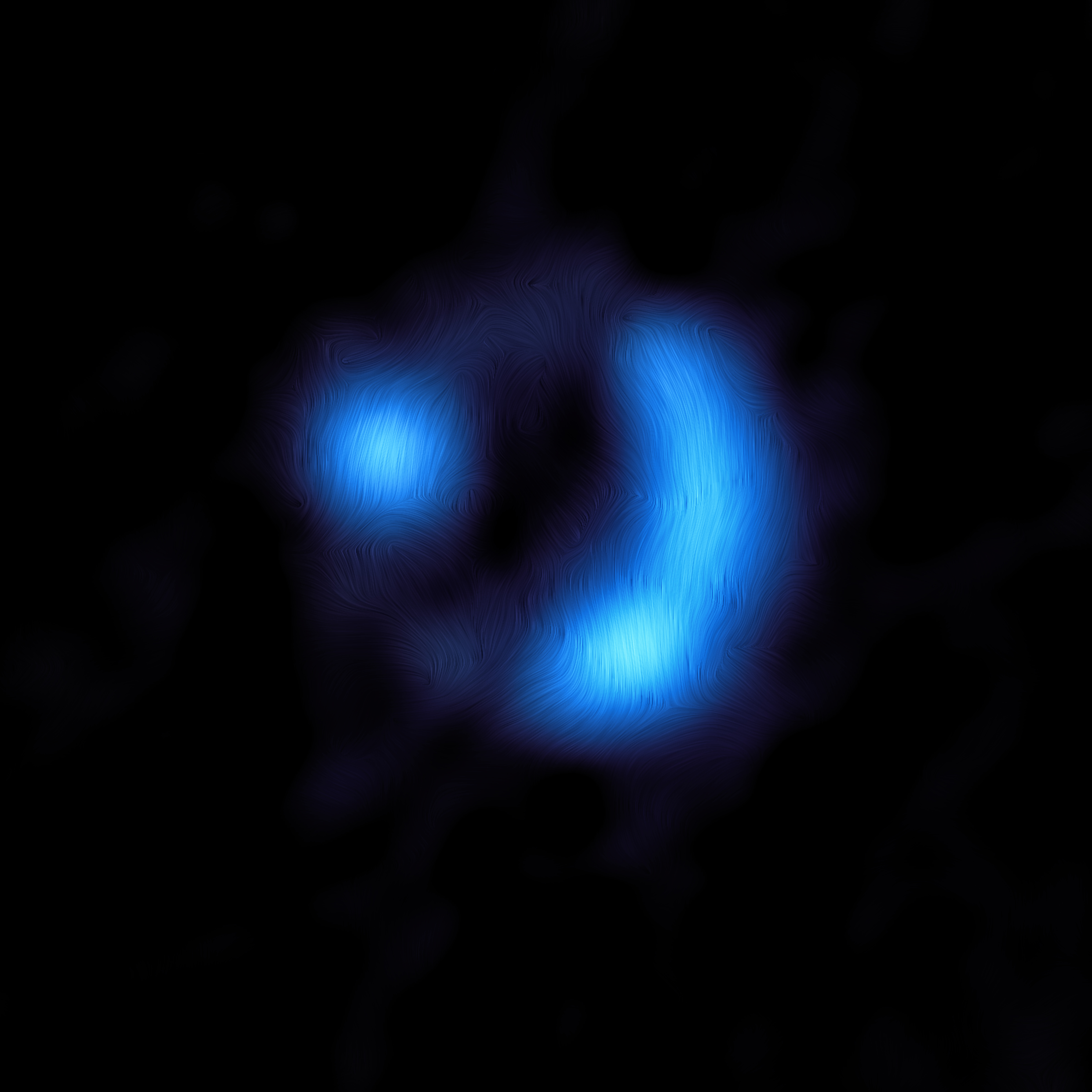
- ALMA image of 9io9, showing the magnetic field in the 11 billion light years distant galaxy.

Observation data (J2000 epoch)
- Constellation: Cetus
- Right ascension: 02^{h} 09^{m} 41.27^{s}
- Declination: +00° 15′ 58.48″
- Redshift: 0.206 (lensing galaxy); 2.554±0.0002 (lensed galaxy)
- Distance: 2.5 and 11.1 Gly (770 and 3,400 Mpc)

Other designations
- G1, G2, HerS J020941.1+001557, HERS1, PJ020941.3

ASW0009io9 (9io9) is a gravitationally lensed system of two galaxies. The nearer galaxy is approximately 2 billion light-years (610 Mpc) from Earth and is designated SDSS J020941.27+001558.4, while the lensed galaxy is 10 billion light-years (3.1 Gpc) distant and is designated ASW0009io9 (shortened to 9io9). It was discovered in January 2014 by a group of citizen scientists, while classifying images on the website Spacewarps.org. The discovery was announced on the BBC television programme Stargazing Live.

== Name ==
The Daily Mail mistakenly named the galaxy 9Spitch and spread the news that Chetnik was the only discoverer of this galaxy. The term 9Spitch comes from Zbigniew "Zbish" Chetnik's nickname Zbish, after a BBC producer misheard his nickname. Chetnik was however not the only one who discovered the galaxy. First the galaxy was classified on the website by volunteers, including Chetnik and then it was followed-up with professional telescopes by astronomers, who named it Red Radio Ring (RRR) or 9io9 after its Space Warps identifier. SIMBAD and NED lists ASW0009io9 as one of the official names. The name 9io9 is the official name of this galaxy and 9Spitch is a name adopted by one newspaper.

== Observations ==
The Red Radio Ring (RRR) was discovered by four independent groups, including the Space Warps project using deep images from the Canada–France–Hawaii Telescope, a cross-match with Herschel-SPIRE and Planck images at 350 μm to identify strongly lensed dusty star-forming galaxies (DSFGs) and follow up with Large Millimeter Telescope, a detection with Herschel-SPIRE 500 μm images to identify strongly lensed DSFGs, and identification of 9io9 as the strongest lensed DSFG in the 278 GHz maps from the Atacama Cosmology Telescope (ACT) and follow-up with the Green Bank Telescope.

The galaxy was studied with the Large Millimetre Telescope, which detected carbon monoxide in the lensed galaxy, and the Subaru Telescope, which detected different spectroscopic lines associated with star formation in the lensed galaxy. This study suggests a high star forming rate of about 2500 M_{☉} yr ^{−1} or a thousand times the star forming rate of the Milky Way. The source reconstruction supports a compact core and an extended region, maybe indicative of a jet or lobe coming from an active galactic nucleus (AGN). The galaxy might be in the center of a large galaxy group or cluster and it will likely evolve into a massive elliptical galaxy.

Observations with the Northern Extended Millimeter Array (NOEMA) and detailed reconstruction of the lensed galaxy suggests an approximately 3-kiloparsec (9,800 ly) diameter rotating disk of gas.

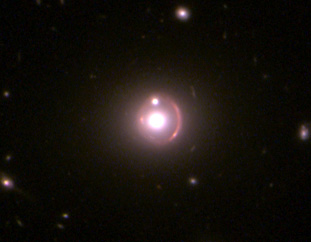
Hubble image of 9io9

9io9 was observed with the Atacama Large Millimeter Array (ALMA) 12-meter antennas in December 2017 as part of project 2017.1.00814.S. The data revealed the presence of atomic carbon and carbon monoxide as a tracer of star formation. It was estimated that the total star formation rate of the molecular ring is about 2800 M_{☉} yr^{−1}. ALMA also detected the cyanide radical travelling twice the velocity of the rotation of the molecular ring, with a radial velocity of 680 km s^{−1}. This is explained as a possible interaction between material outflowing from the AGN and interstellar material.

Harrington et al. (2019) reports four independent detections of the Red Radio Ring, including the detection with Space Warps. In their paper they report new Atacama Pathfinder Experiment (APEX) observations, presenting the detection of nitrogen [N II] 205 μm. The velocity structure of the nitrogen is similar to carbon monoxide and they concluded that both share the same volume. The ratio of the nitrogen luminosity and the infrared luminosity resembles more a normal star-forming galaxy and less a galaxy with star-formation influenced by a quasar.

== Magnetic field ==
In 2023 observations with ALMA helped to detect a magnetic field for 9io9, the furthest detected magnetic field ever detected at the time of the discovery. The field is a thousand times weaker than Earth's magnetic field, but extends 16,000 light years. A field strength of around 500 μG was measured and the magnetic fields are orientated parallel to the gas disk of the galaxy.
