= Edwin Foster Coddington =

American astronomer

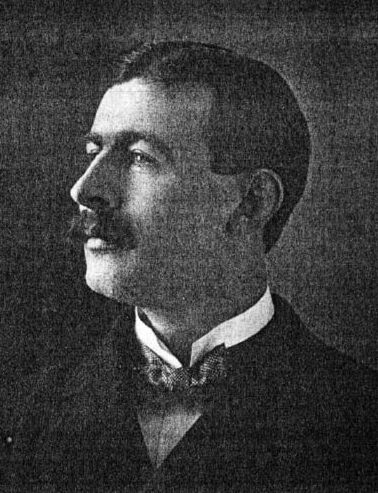
- Edwin Foster Coddington
- Born: June 24, 1870
- Died: December 21, 1950 (aged 80)
- Known for: Co-discovered Comet 1898 VII and three asteroids
- Scientific career
- Fields: Astronomy, astrometry

Asteroids discovered: 3
| 439 Ohio | October 13, 1898 | MPC |
| 440 Theodora | October 13, 1898 | MPC |
| 445 Edna | October 2, 1899 | MPC |

Edwin Foster Coddington (June 24, 1870 – December 21, 1950) was an American astronomer and discoverer of astronomical objects.

He co-discovered the comet C/1898 L1 (Coddington-Pauly), also known by the older designation Comet 1898 VII. He also discovered 3 asteroids, and the galaxy IC 2574 in Ursa Major, which later became known as "Coddington's Nebula".

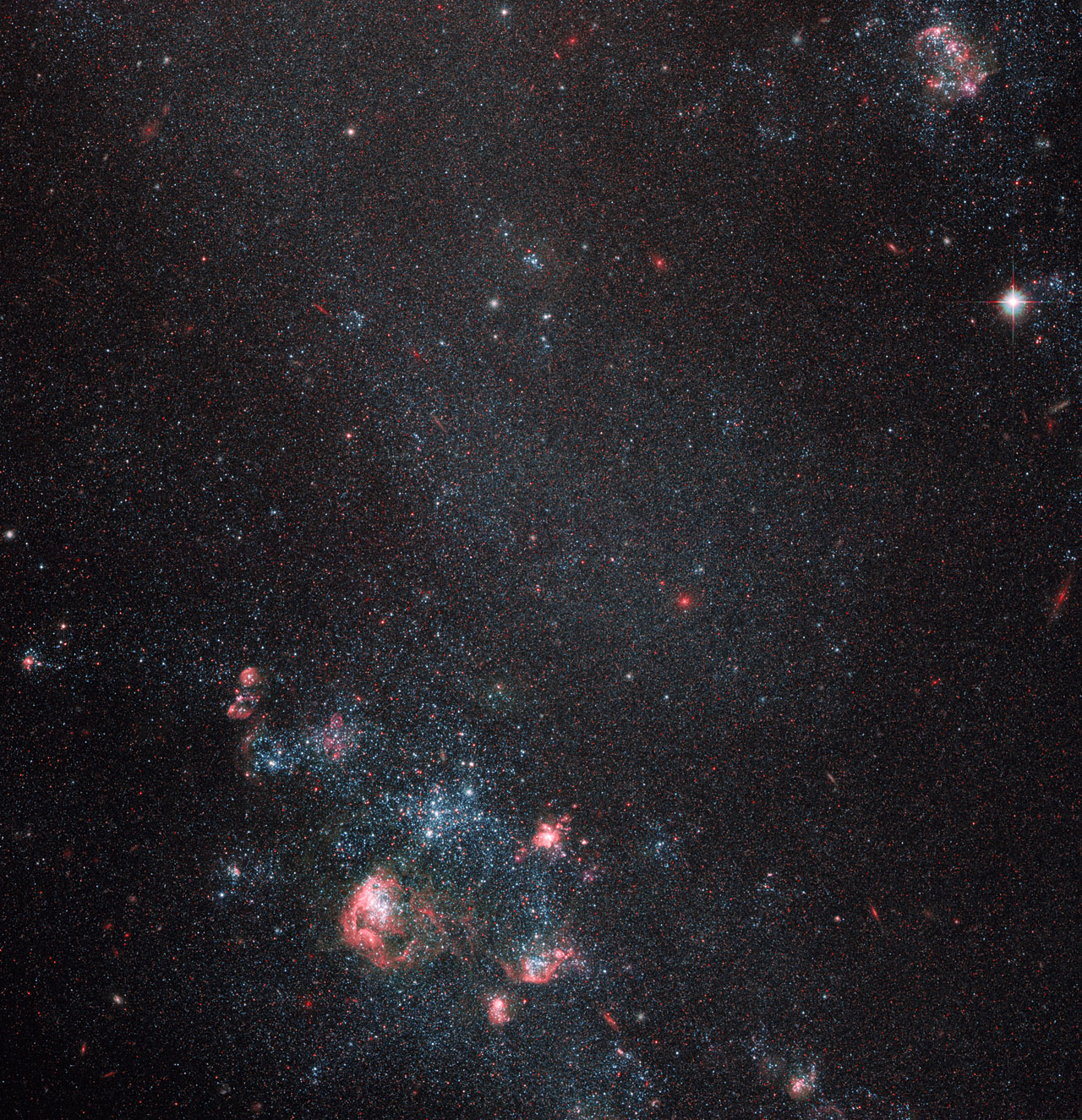
Coddington's Nebula (IC 2574) discovered by Coddington in 1898

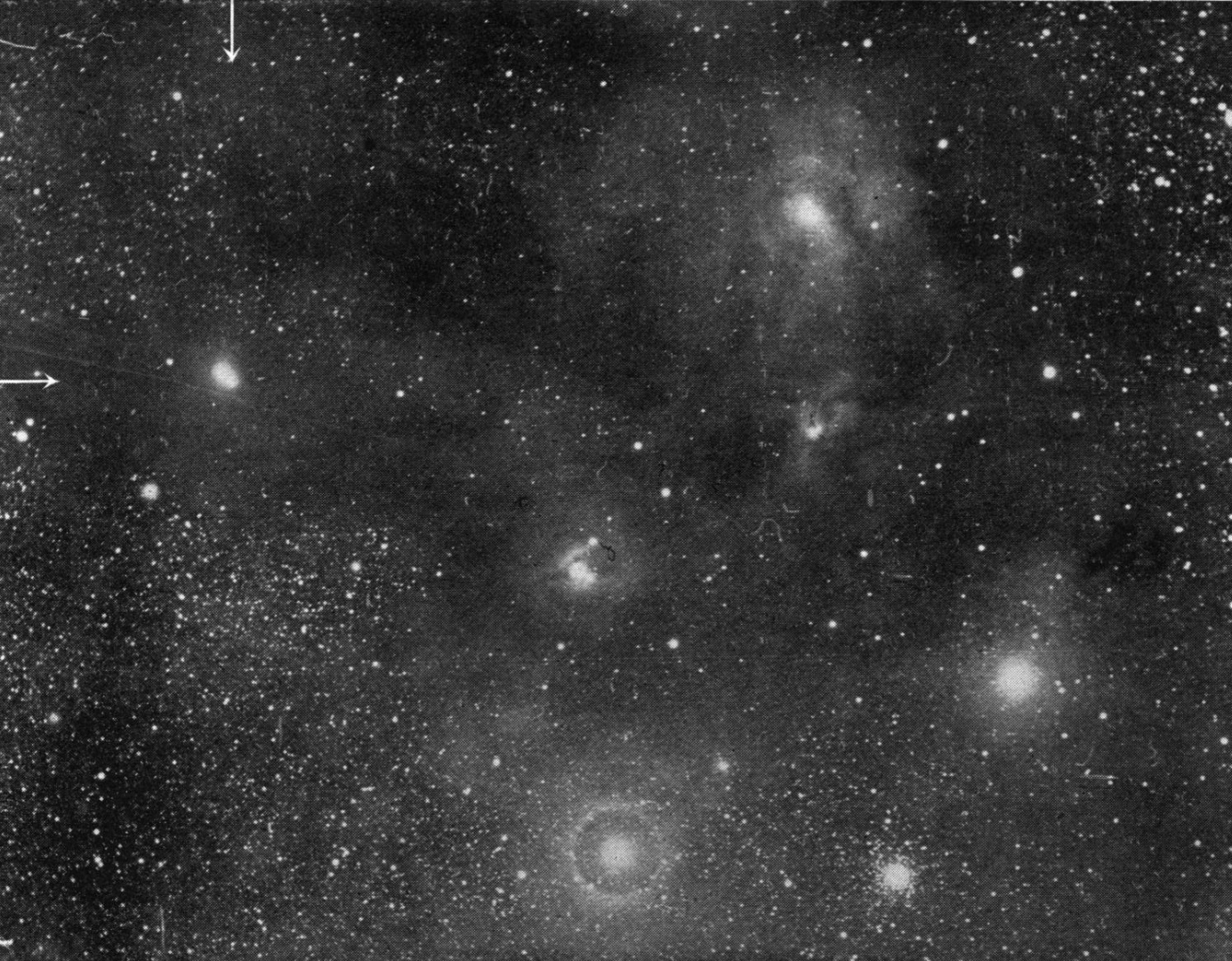
C/1898 L1 (Coddington–Pauly) discovered by Coddington on 10 June 1898
