= Arp 104 =

Pair of galaxies in the constellation of Ursa Major

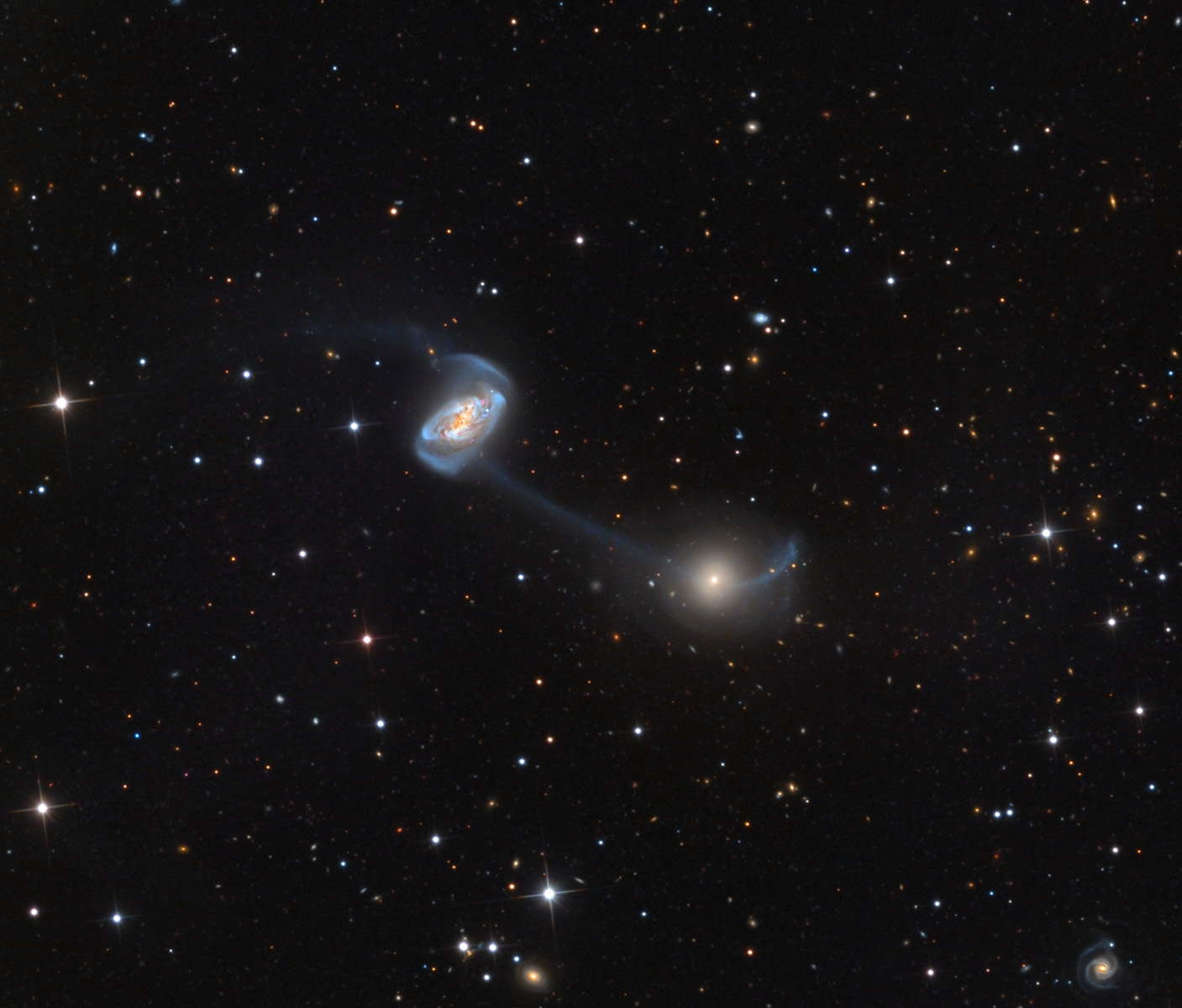
- NGC 5216: The Keenan System, Arp 104

Observation data (J2000 epoch)
- Constellation: Ursa Major
- Right ascension: 13^{h} 32^{m} 08.9^{s}
- Declination: +62° 44′ 02″
- Redshift: 0.010817
- Distance: 1.73 × 10^{7}
- Apparent magnitude (V): 14.0/12.3

Characteristics
- Type: E0/SBb-pec
- Notable features: bridged

Other designations
- Keenan's system NGC 5216/NGC 5218; UGC 8528/UGC 8529 VV 33a/VV 33b

Arp 104, also known as Keenan's System, is entry 104 in Halton Arp's Atlas of Peculiar Galaxies catalog for spiral galaxy NGC 5216 and globular galaxy NGC 5218. The two galaxies are joined by a bridge of galactic material spanning 22 000 light years.

In 1790 William Herschel discovered the galaxies, and in 1926 they were studied by Edwin Hubble. In 1935 Philip C. Keenan first published a paper about the bridge connecting the galaxies, which was rediscovered in 1958 at the Lick and Palomar observatories.
