= NGC 3553 =

Galaxy in the constellation Ursa Major

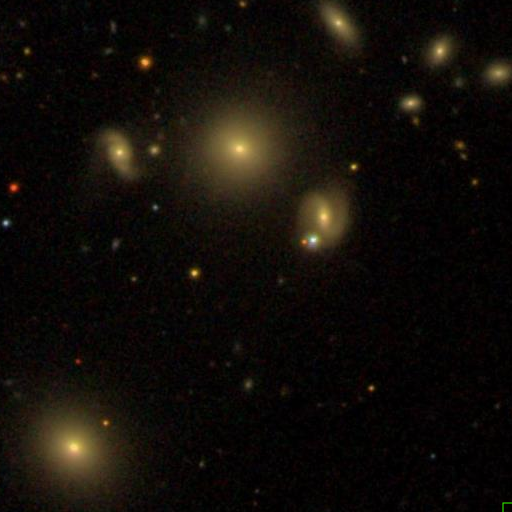
- SDSS image of NGC 3553 (red arrow)

Observation data (J2000 epoch)
- Constellation: Ursa Major
- Right ascension: 11^{h} 10^{m} 40.30586^{s}
- Declination: +28° 41′ 08.3322″
- Redshift: 0.03209
- Heliocentric radial velocity: 9466 km/s
- Group or cluster: Abell 1185
- Apparent magnitude (V): 15.3
- Apparent magnitude (B): 14.0

Characteristics
- Type: Sa

Other designations
- MCG +05-27-004, PGC 1842970

NGC 3553 is a lenticular galaxy in the constellation Ursa Major. It was discovered in March 1885 by Guillaume Bigourdan. It is a member of the galaxy cluster Abell 1185.
