= Blanco 1 =

Star cluster in the constellation of Sculptor

- Image of Blanco 1

Observation data (J2000 epoch)
- Right ascension: 00^{h} 04^{m} 24^{s}
- Declination: –29° 56.4′
- Distance: 850+160 −130 ly (260+50 −40 pc)

Physical characteristics
- Estimated age: 100–150 Myr

Associations
- Constellation: Sculptor

Blanco 1 (ζ Sculptoris cluster) is a nearby open cluster of stars located around 850 light years away from the Sun in the southern constellation of Sculptor near the star ζ Sculptoris. It was discovered by Puerto Rican astronomer Víctor Manuel Blanco in 1959, who noticed an unusually high proportion of A-type stars in an area spanning 1.5°. This cluster is relatively young, with an age of about 100–150 million years. It is positioned at a high galactic latitude of b = –79.3° and is located some 780 ly (240 pc) below the galactic plane.

Blanco 1 contains approximately 300 stars, around 170 of these being brighter than magnitude +12, the brightest of which is HD 225187, a 7th-magnitude B8V star. It has a cross-sectional magnitudal density of about 30 per square parsec: less than half that of the Pleiades cluster. Of the confirmed members, eight have been found to radiate an excess of infrared energy, indicating that they host orbiting debris disks. Roughly half the stars in the cluster are members of binary star systems; six of the member stars are confirmed spectroscopic binaries. A system known as NGTS J0002-29 is a triple system that contains one of only a few well-characterised eclipsing binaries with two red dwarfs: they orbit each other with a period of 1.098 days. There are also some 30–40 brown dwarf members.
