= IC 2574 =

Dwarf spiral galaxy in the constellation of Ursa Major

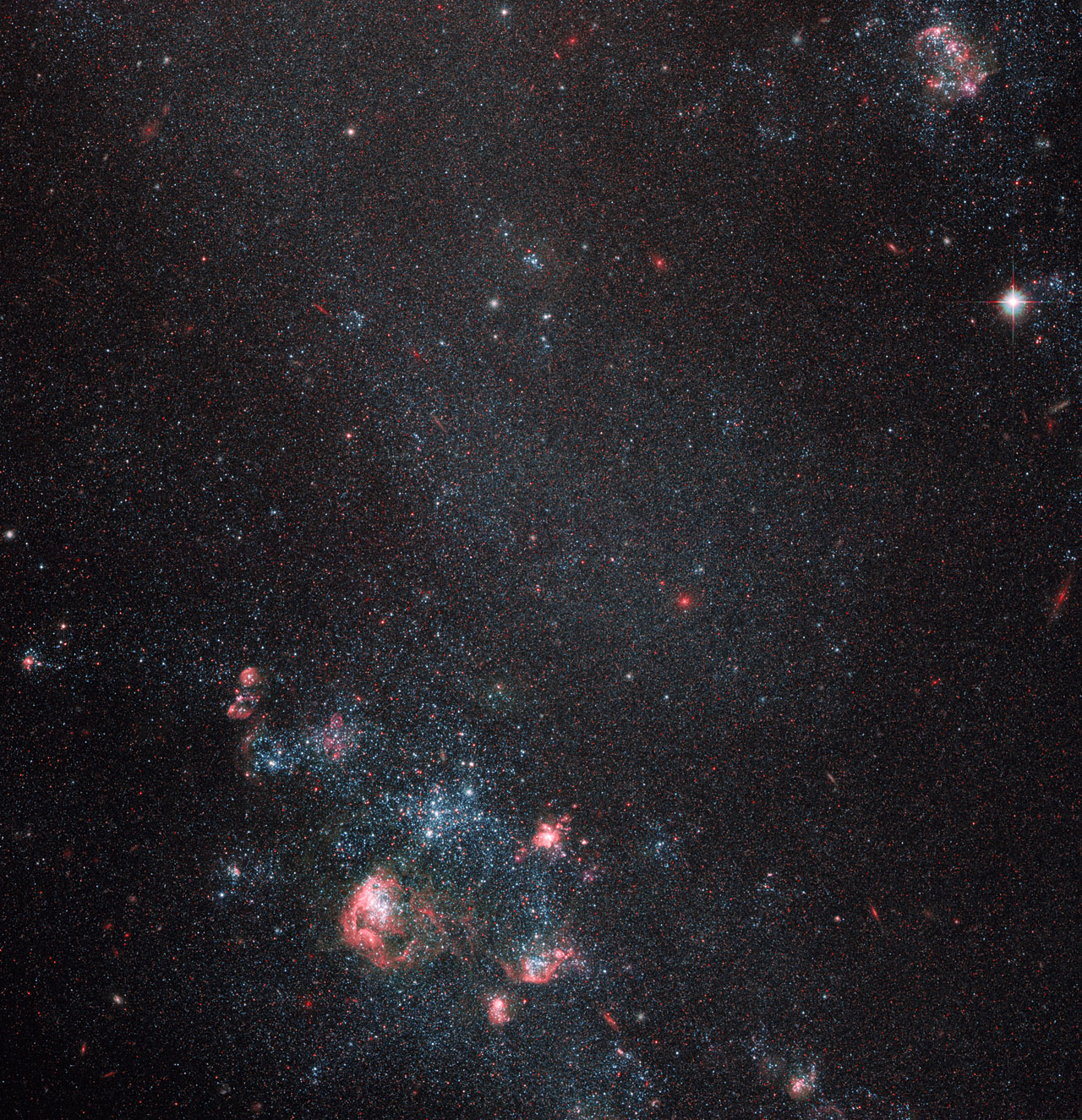
- IC 2574 imaged by Hubble's Advanced Camera for Surveys

Observation data (J2000 epoch)
- Constellation: Ursa Major
- Right ascension: 10^{h} 28^{m} 23.62046^{s}
- Declination: +68° 24′ 43.4414″
- Redshift: 0.000160±0.000020
- Heliocentric radial velocity: 57 ± 2 km/s
- Distance: 12.8 Mly (3.93 Mpc)
- Group or cluster: M81 Group

Characteristics
- Type: SABm
- Apparent size (V): 12.02′ × 5.50′

Other designations
- Coddington's Nebula, UGC 5666, MCG +12-10-038, PGC 30819, CGCG 333-031

IC 2574, also known as Coddington's Nebula, is a dwarf spiral galaxy discovered by American astronomer Edwin Foster Coddington in 1898. Located in Ursa Major, a constellation in the northern sky, it is an outlying member of the M81 Group. It is believed that 90% of its mass is in the form of dark matter. IC 2574 does not show evidence of interaction with other galaxies. It is currently forming stars; a UV analysis showed clumps of star formation 85 to 500 light-years (26 to 150 pc) in size.

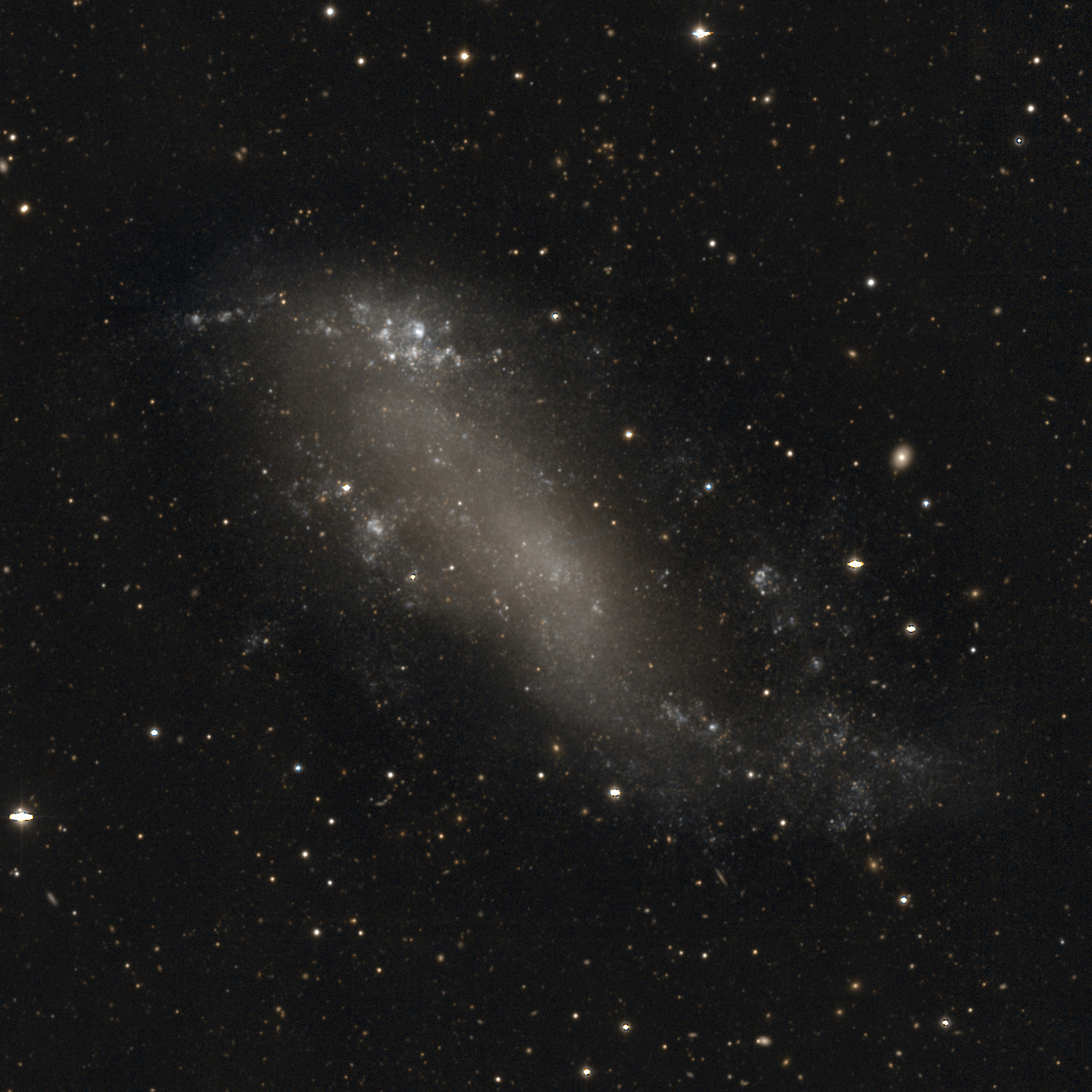
Complete image of IC 2574 with legacy surveys
