= NGC 3561 =

Pair of interacting galaxies in the constellation Ursa Major

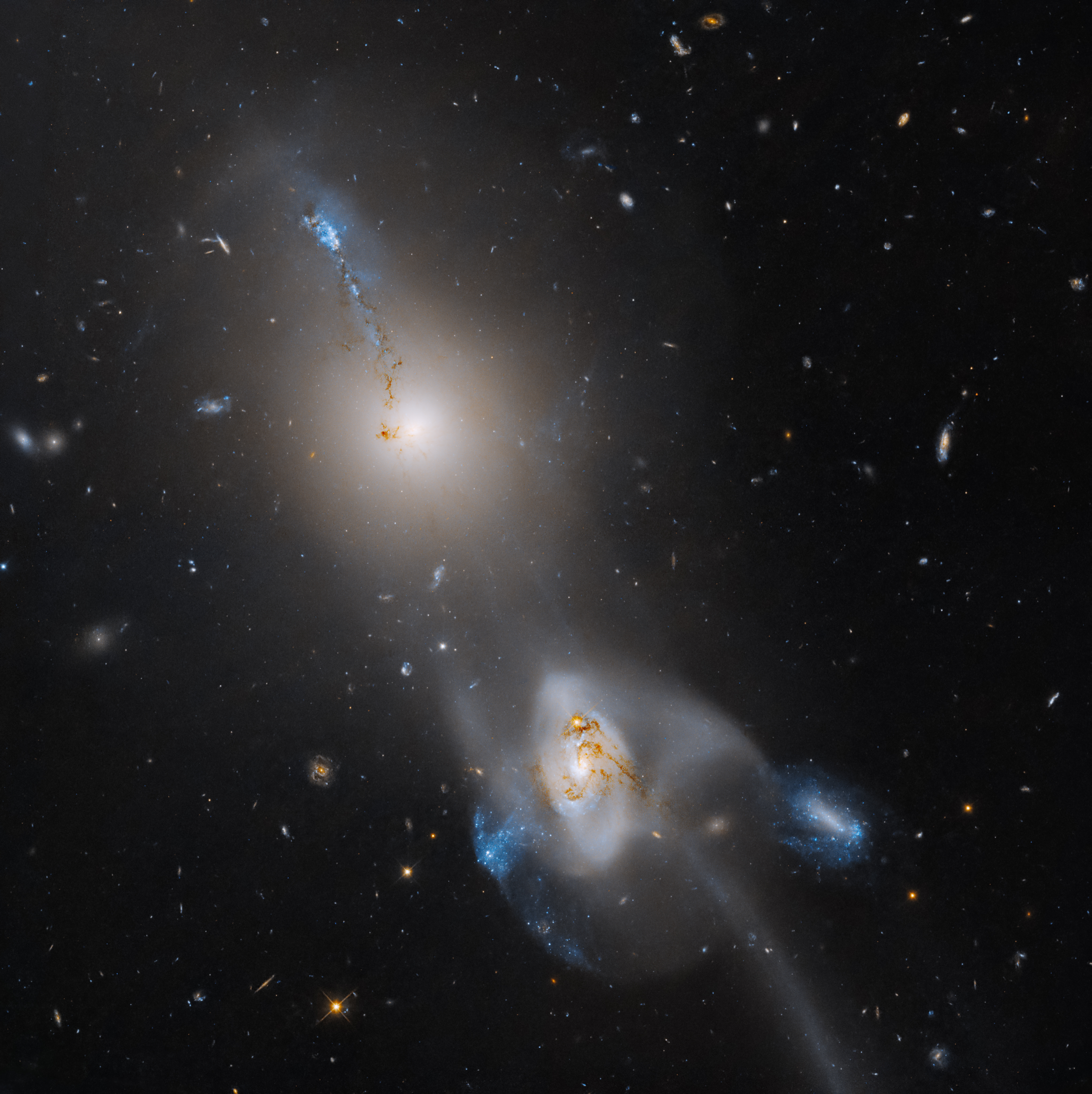
- Hubble Space Telescope image of elliptical galaxy NGC 3561B (upper left) and spiral galaxy NGC 3561A (lower right), known collectively as Arp 105.

Observation data (J2000 epoch)
- Constellation: Ursa Major
- Right ascension: 11^{h} 11^{m} 13.2^{s}
- Declination: +28° 41′ 47″
- Redshift: 0.029367
- Heliocentric radial velocity: 8804 km/s
- Distance: 412.3 Mly (126.41 Mpc)
- Group or cluster: Abell 1185
- Apparent magnitude (V): 14.5

Characteristics
- Type: A: Sa; B: E5
- Apparent size (V): 1.36 x 0.69

Other designations
- A: NGC 3561A, Arp 105 NED01, UGC 06224 NED01, MCG +05-27-011, PGC 33992, CGCG 155-090 NED01, VV 237c B: IRAS 11085+2859, NGC 3561B, Arp 105 NED02, UGC 6224 NED02, MCG +05-27-010, PGC 33991, CGCG 155-090 NED02, VV 237a

NGC 3561, also known as Arp 105, is a pair of interacting galaxies NGC 3561A and NGC 3561B within the galaxy cluster Abell 1185 in Ursa Major. It was discovered by British astronomer John Herschel on 30 March 1827. Its common name is "the Guitar" and contains a small tidal dwarf galaxy known as Ambartsumian's Knot that is believed to be the remnant of the extensive tidal tail pulled out of one of the galaxies.

One supernova has been observed in NGC 3561A: SN 1953A (type unknown, mag. 16) was discovered by Halton Arp on 16 April 1953.

== Image gallery ==
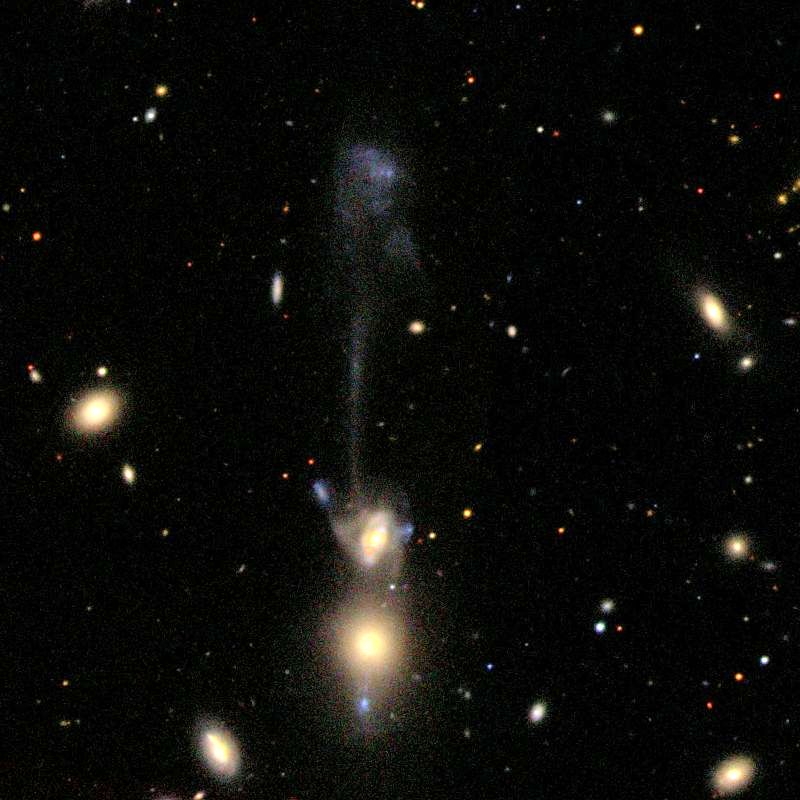
SDSS image of NGC 3561B (lower and brightest round spot of "the guitar") and NGC 3561A (oval shape above NGC 3561B). Ambartsumian's Knot is the blue speck below NGC 3561B.
