= IC 349 =

Nebula in the constellation of Taurus

Barnard's Merope Nebula
Reflection nebula
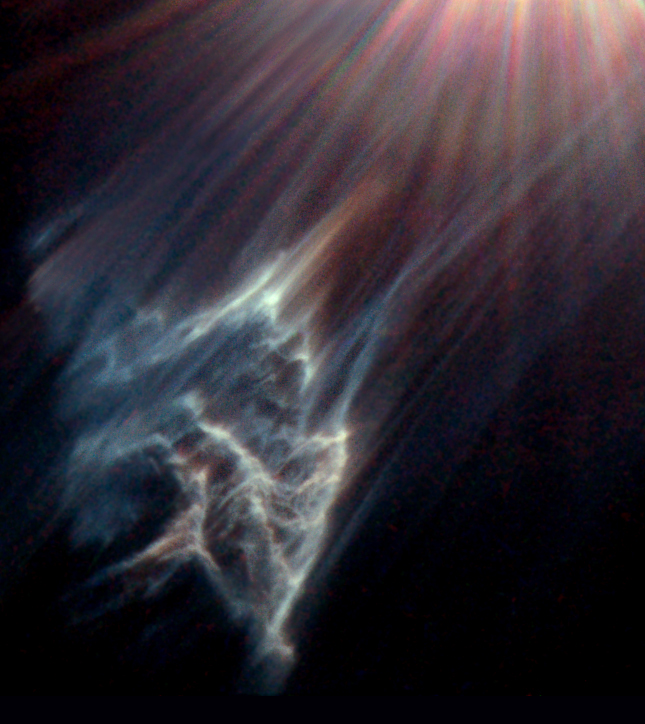
- Photo of IC 349, taken by NASA and The Hubble Heritage Team (STScI/AURA) 19 September 1999.

Observation data: J2000 epoch
- Right ascension: 03^{h} 46^{m} 21.3^{s}
- Declination: +23° 56′ 28″
- Distance: 440 ly (135 pc)
- Apparent magnitude (V): 13
- Apparent diameter: 0.5'
- Constellation: Taurus
- Notable features: Lies very close to the star Merope
- Designations: Ced 19i

IC 349, also known as Barnard's Merope Nebula, is a nebula which lies 3500 AUs (0.06 light years) from the star Merope in the Pleiades cluster.

It was discovered in November 1890 by the American astronomer Edward Emerson Barnard, who described it as "a new and comparatively bright round cometary nebula close south and following Merope (23 Tau) ... about 30" in diameter, of the 13 (magnitude), gradually brighter in the middle, and very cometary in appearance.” The British astronomer Charles Pritchard, however, disputed Barnard's discovery announcement, claiming to have discovered it himself on a photographic plate obtained at Oxford on 29 January 1889. Pritchard dismissed IC 349 as an "apparently insignificant fleck," dismissing a distinct identity for the object and instead regarding it simply as the brightest part of the broader reflection nebulosity enveloping the Pleiades. Sherburne Wesley Burnham agreed with Barnard's estimation of the importance of the nebula, calling it "far more interesting than any of the nebulae heretofore discovered in the Pleiades by visual and photographic method" and "one of the most singular objects in the heavens." Burnham further speculated as to whether IC 349 was kinematically related to the Pleiades, suggesting that its proper motion might provide a definitive answer.

IC 349 may be an example of a cold, dense, very small-scale condensation of the interstellar medium. Morphologically, it appears to have a roughly pentagonal shape with a bright knot situated closest to Merope. This knot was examined for evidence of an embedded protostar, but none was found to a luminosity upper limit of 0.23 ± 0.05 times the luminosity of the Sun. This implies an upper limit of 0.15 times the mass of the Sun for a deuterium-burning protostar embedded in the knot, whose existence is further rendered dubious by a lack of emission lines characteristic of pre–Main Sequence stars in its optical spectrum. Further searches in the near-infrared also failed to show any evidence of an embedded protostar in the bright knot, showing only wavelength-dependent scattering of light consistent with the presence of very fine dust particles.

Analysis of the nebula's space motion indicate it does not share the velocity and direction of the Pleiades, suggesting a chance encounter between the objects. Because IC 349 shares the velocity of molecular gas in the nearby Taurus Molecular Cloud complex, it may have originated there.

IC 349 is now sufficiently close to Merope that its envelope is undergoing disruption by either the star's radiation pressure, a stellar wind, or both.
