= Maffei =

Maffei may refer to:

== People ==
- Maffei (surname), people with the surname Maffei

== Places ==
- Istituto Maffei, high school in Verona, Italy
- Palazzo Maffei, multiple places in Italy

== Companies ==
- Maffei (company), German locomotives manufacturer
- KraussMaffei, German manufacturer
  - Krauss-Maffei Wegmann, German arms manufacturer

== Astronomy ==
- Maffei Group, group of galaxies
  - Maffei 1, massive elliptical galaxy in the constellation Cassiopeia
  - Maffei 2, intermediate spiral galaxy in the constellation Cassiopeia
- 18426 Maffei, minor planet
