= Local Sheet =

Nearby small galaxy filement

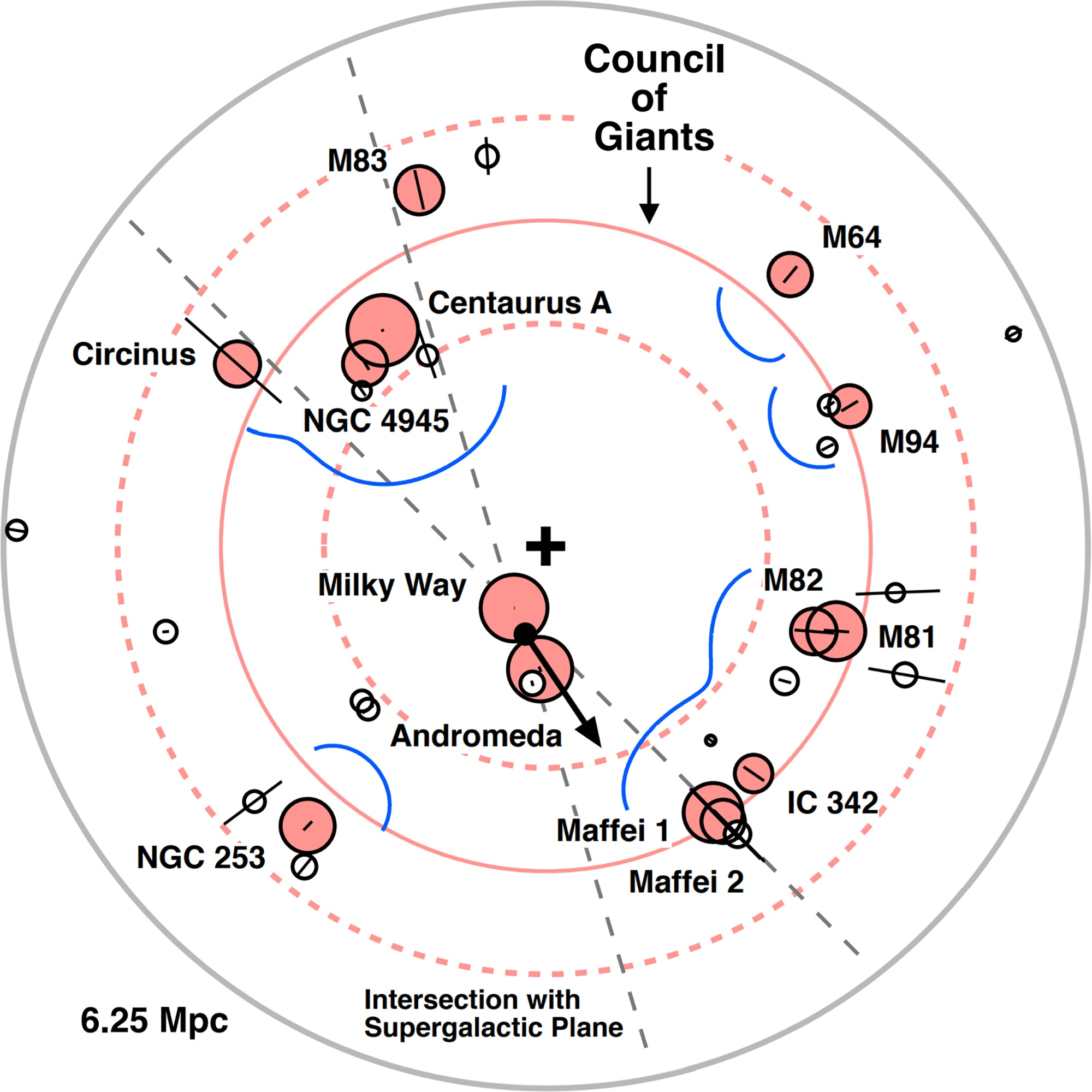
- A portion of the Local Sheet, the Council of Giants, on the top view within 10 million light-years from Earth, including the Local Group and other nearby giant galaxies.

Observation data (Epoch J2000)
- Number of galaxies: 14 (giant galaxies)
- Parent structure: Local Volume
- Major axis: 33.9 Mly (10.4 Mpc)
- Minor axis: 1.52 Mly (0.465 Mpc)
- Velocity dispersion: 47 km/s
- Distance: 420,700 ly (129 kpc) (center)
- ICM temperature: 7.3×10^{5} K
- Binding mass: 1.6×10^{13} M_{☉}

Other designations
- Local Street, Coma–Sculptor Cloud

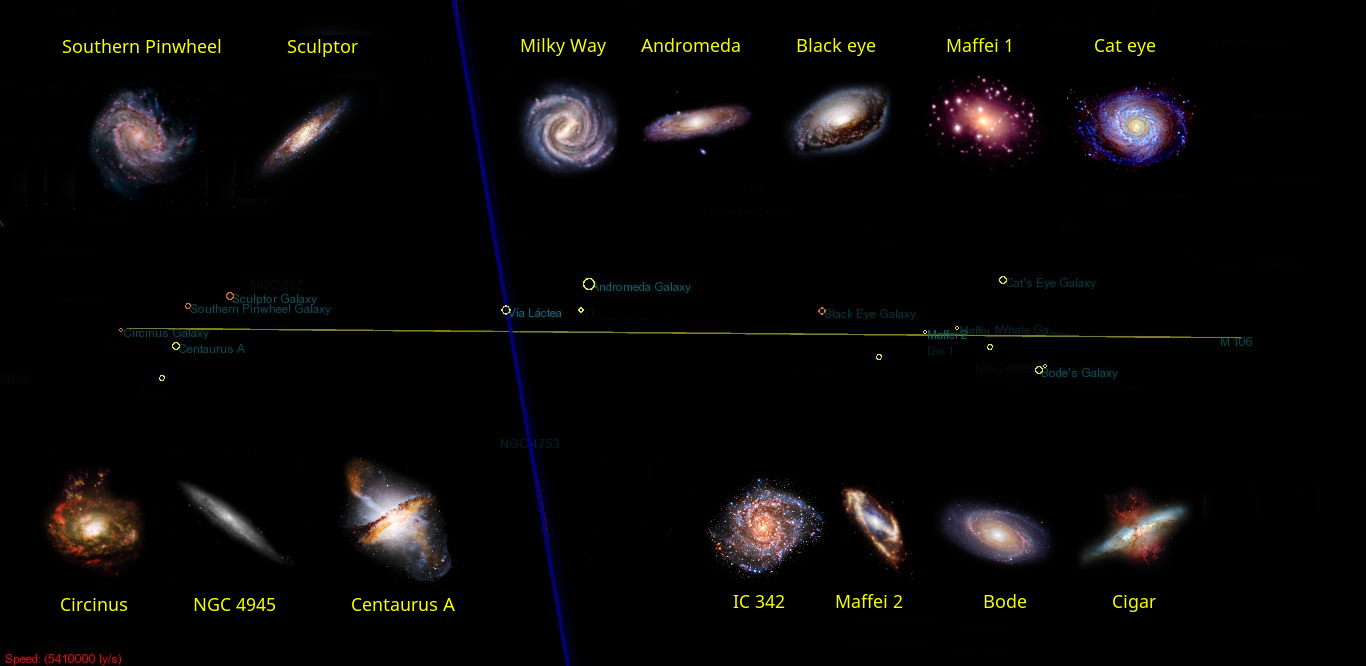
The 14 major galaxies, including Milky Way and Andromeda Galaxies, of the Local Sheet

The Local Sheet or the Coma–Sculptor Cloud is a nearby galaxy filament and an extragalactic region of space where the Milky Way, the members of the Local Group, and other galaxies share a similar peculiar velocity. This region lies within a diameter of about 10.4 megaparsecs (34 million light-years; 3.2×10^{20} kilometres), 465 kiloparsecs (1.52 million light-years; 1.43×10^{19} kilometres) thick, and galaxies beyond that distance show markedly different velocities. The Local Group has only a relatively small peculiar velocity of 66 km⋅s^{−1} with respect to the Local Sheet. Typical velocity dispersion of galaxies is only 40 km⋅s^{−1} in the radial direction. Nearly all nearby bright galaxies belong to the Local Sheet. The Local Sheet is part of the Local Volume and is in the Virgo Supercluster (Local Supercluster). The Local Sheet forms a wall of galaxies delineating one boundary of the Local Void.

A significant component of the mean velocity of the galaxies in the Local Sheet appears as the result of the gravitational attraction of the Virgo Cluster of galaxies, resulting in a peculiar motion ~185 km⋅s^{−1} toward the cluster. A second component is directed away from the center of the Local Void; an expanding region of space spanning an estimated 45 Mpc (150 Mly) that is only sparsely populated with galaxies. This component has a velocity of 259 km⋅s^{−1}. The Local Sheet is inclined 8° from the Local Supercluster (Virgo Supercluster).

The so-called Council of Giants is a ring of twelve large galaxies surrounding the Local Group in the Local Sheet, with a radius of 3.746 Mpc (12.22 Mly) and its center located at 810 kpc (2.6 Mly) away from the Sun. Ten of these are spirals, while the remaining two are ellipticals. The two ellipticals (Maffei 1 and Centaurus A) lie on opposite sides of the Local Group.

Galaxies in the "Council of Giants"
Catalog ID	Name	Constellation	Distance (Mly)	Stellar mass *
NGC 253	Sculptor Galaxy	Sculptor	11	10.805
PGC 9892	Maffei 1	Cassiopeia	11	10.928
PGC 10217	Maffei 2	Cassiopeia	11	10.493
IC 342		Camelopardalis	11	10.302
NGC 3031	M 81	Ursa Major	12	10.905
NGC 3034	M 82	Ursa Major	11	10.573
NGC 4736	M 94	Canes Venatici	15	10.458
NGC 4826	M 64	Coma Berenices	16	10.496
NGC 5236	M 83	Hydra	16	10.642
NGC 5128	Centaurus A	Centaurus	11	11.169
NGC 4945		Centaurus	12	10.528
ESO 97-G13	Circinus Galaxy	Circinus	14	10.559

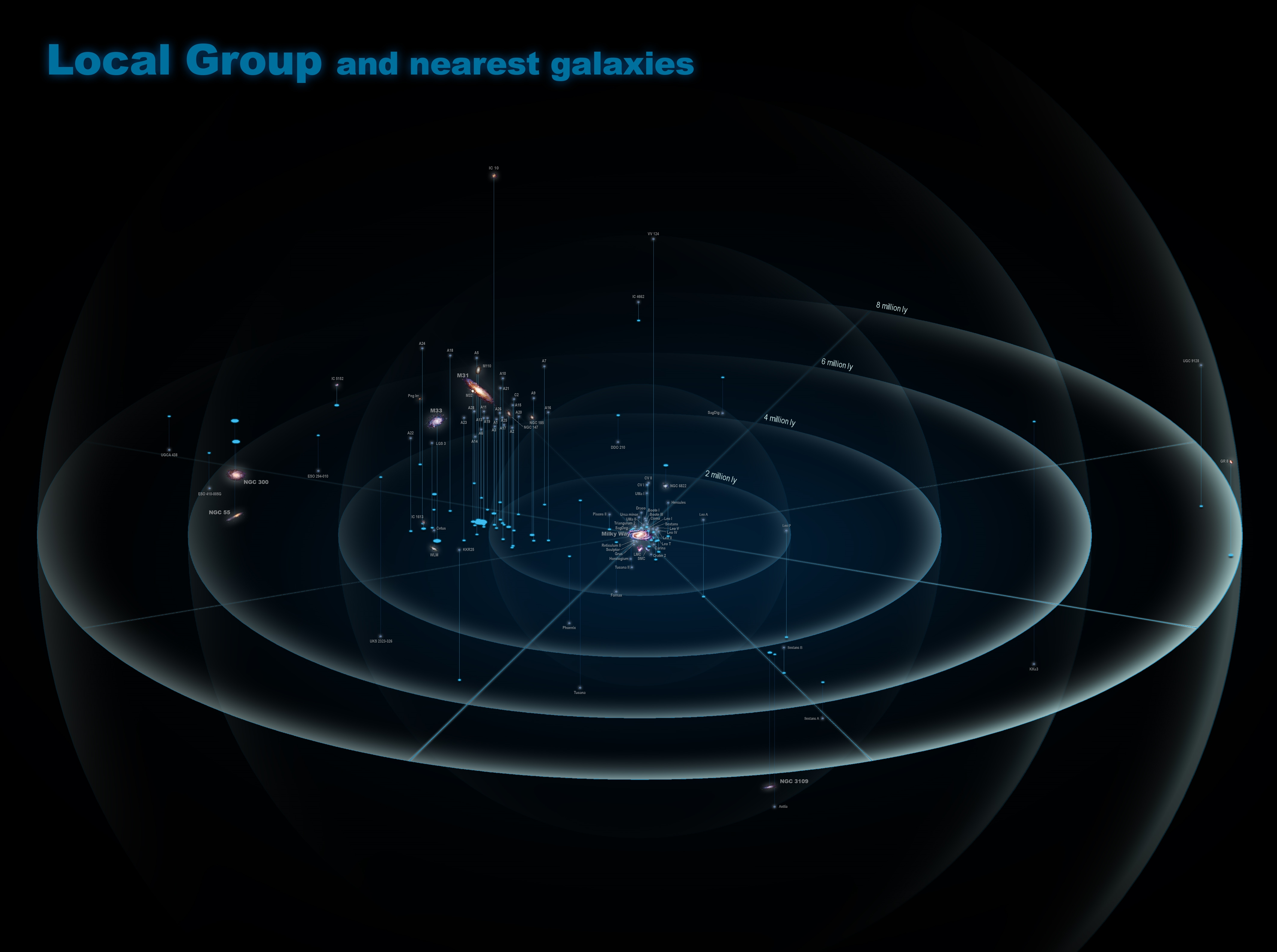
A portion of the Local Sheet within a map of 8 million light-years from Earth, including the Local Group and some other nearby galaxies.

* The mass is given as the logarithm (base unspecified) of the mass in solar masses.

== Location ==
The Local Sheet is the co-moving part of the Coma-Sculptor Cloud, which was identified and described in 1987 by astronomer Brent Tully with colleague Richard Fisher in his book The Nearby Galaxies Atlas as Cloud 14. It is a huge 10 Mpc (33 Mly) prolate, filament and is mostly host to late-type galaxies, in contrast to the Virgo Cluster, in which more than half of the giant galaxies are early-type galaxies.

Tully maintains that the Coma-Sculptor Cloud and the Local Sheet do not quite overlap, as the Local Sheet comprises only the co-moving part of the Coma-Sculptor Cloud. McCall considers the two terms synonymous, referring to one and the same region.

=== List of Groups ===
Below is a list of groups in the Coma-Sculptor Cloud according to astronomer Brent Tully. The table lists the name of the group in Tully's NBGC with the second row consisting of group Cross IDs from the survey of Fouque et al., the Lyons Groups of Galaxies (LGG) Catalog.

(Sources for data columns:)

Groups within the Coma- Sculptor Cloud
Name of group	Cross-ID
NBGC 14-1	Coma I, NGC 4062 Group, NGC 4274 Group, NGC 4565 Group, LGG 279, LGG 294
NBGC 14-2	Coma I
NBGC 14-4	Canes Venatici II Group, LGG 290
NBGC 14-5	NGC 5194 Group, LGG 347
NBGC 14-6	NGC 4631 Group LGG 291
NBGC 14-7	Canes Venatici I Group LGG 290
NBGC 14-9	NGC 5457 Group LGG 371
NBGC 14-10	NGC 2403 Group, NGC 3031 Group LGG 176
NBGC 14-11	IC 342 Group, LGG 104
NBGC 14-12	Local Group
NBGC 14-13	Sculptor Group, LGG 4
NBGC 14-15	NGC 5128 Group LGG 344

== See also ==
- Supergalactic coordinate system, the coordinate system taking the Local Sheet, the Supergalactic Plane, as its X–Y bases
