= Local (astronomy) =

In astronomy, local is a term applied to an astronomical object or structure when it is close to an Earth observer, relative to its size. If the scale is large enough to make Earth's distance from the Sun immaterial, the relative closeness of the phenomenon to the star system of the Sun is considered instead.

== History ==
Hendrik C. van de Hulst in 1965 used the following table to describe local objects and structures on varying scales, and the local universe at given times:

Object	log size (cm)	Beginning of scientific investigations (year A.C.)
Lecture room	3.0	
Alpbach	5.5	
Tirol	7.3	
Austria	7.8	
Europe	8.6	0
Earth	9.1	1500
Solar System	13.2 = 1 AU	1700
Local spiral arm	21.5 = 1000 parsecs	1850–1900
The galaxy	23.0 = 30 kpc	
Local clusters of galaxies	24.5 = 3M-lightyears	1930
The universe	28.0 = 10G-lightyears	

== Updated terms ==
In the 21st century, the term "local" commonly applies to a list of astronomical groups on successively larger scales. Many of the entries correspond to the latter portion of van de Hulst's list, beyond the roughly two-light-year diameter of the Solar System. Some entries are based on a more detailed understanding of astronomical structures:

- The Local Interstellar Cloud containing the Solar System, roughly 30 light years across
- The Local Bubble of gas in turn containing the Local Interstellar Cloud, 300-800 light years across
- The Local Arm, a.k.a. the Orion-Cygnus Arm (of the Milky Way galaxy), 3,500 light years wide, and approximately 10,000 long
- The Local Galaxy, the Milky Way, a lens or disc about 1,000 light years thick and 100,000 in diameter
- The Local Group, the group of galaxies, roughly 53 in number, that contains the Milky Way, 10 million light-years across
- The Extended Local Group, the Local Group, plus the Maffei (Note: Pronounced /ˈmɑːfaɪ/MAH-fay.) and the Sculptor Group of galaxies.
- The Local Supercluster or Virgo Supercluster, 110 million light-years across, contains the Virgo Cluster and the Extended Local Group.
- The Local Filament, the Extended Local Group, plus the superstructures of galaxies known as the Coma-Supercluster and the Sculptor Wall, hundreds of millions of light years across.
  - The Local Filament is one boundary for the Local Void, 196 million light-years across, which forms a central frame of reference for numerous other superclusters, both inside and outside of the Local Filament.

A few years after scientific investigations of local clusters of galaxies began (1930), Edwin Hubble stated that knowledge of "galactic systems" such as the local group, a term Hubble had coined, is sufficient for understanding the structure of all unobserved parts of the universe: "Thus, for purposes of speculation, we may apply the principal of uniformity, and suppose that any other equal portion of the universe, selected at random, is much the same as the observable region. We may assume that the realm of the nebulæ (Note: The term nebulæ was understood in Hubble's time to mean galaxies, although the word 'galaxy' was often used to refer solely to the Milky Way. The usage current at that time was analogous to the way our sun is referred to as the Sun, and other 'suns' are referred to as stars.) is the universe and that the observable region is a fair sample." This understanding of locality at the scale of galaxies was a restatement of the Cosmological Principle.

Hubble placed the scale at which the universe becomes homogeneous (same in any random location) and isotropic (same in any direction) at the limits of what telescopes of his day could see. Modern physical cosmology agrees with Hubble's statement but, since the advent of better telescopes, has differed on the size of the scale, placing it closer to around 100 Mpc (roughly 300 million light-years), which is roughly at the scale of the local filament, the largest astronomical term to which has been commonly attached the word "local."

== See also ==
- Astronomical object
- Orders of magnitude (length)
- Size and regions in Wikipedia article "Universe"
- Observable universe
- Large-scale structure of the universe
