= NGC 7752 and NGC 7753 =

Pair of galaxies in the constellation of Pegasus

NGC 7752 / 7753
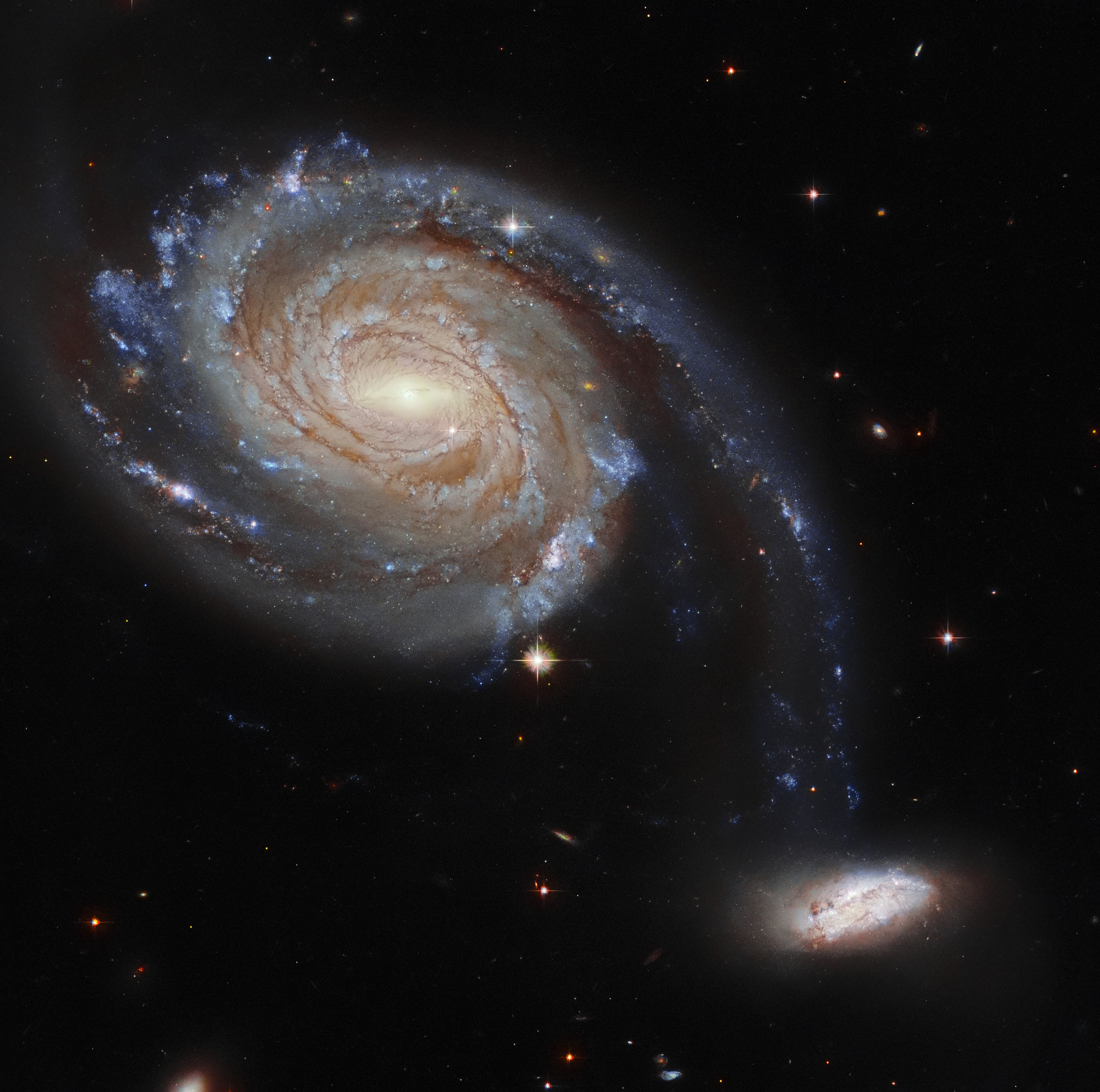
- NGC 7753 (big) and 7752 (small, bottom right), imaged by the Hubble Space Telescope

Observation data (J2000 epoch)
- Constellation: Pegasus
- Right ascension: 23^{h} 46^{m} 58.5^{s} / 23^{h} 47^{m} 04.8^{s}
- Declination: +29° 27′ 32″ / +29° 29′ 00″
- Heliocentric radial velocity: 5072 ± 5 / 5168 ± 6 km/s
- Distance: 272 Mly
- Apparent magnitude (V): 15.0 / 12.8

Characteristics
- Type: I0 / SAB(rs)bc
- Size: 30.82 kiloparsecs (100,500 light-years) (NGC 7753 diameter; 25.0 mag/arcsec^{2} B-band isophote)
- Apparent size (V): 0.8′ × 0.5′ / 3.3′ × 2.1′

Other designations
- UGC 12779 / 12780, PGC 72382 / 72387, Arp 86

NGC 7752 and NGC 7753 are a pair of galaxies approximately 272 million light-years away in the constellation Pegasus. They were discovered by R. J. Mitchell on 22 November 1854.

NGC 7753 is the primary galaxy. It is a barred spiral galaxy with a small nucleus. NGC 7752 is the satellite galaxy of NGC 7753. It is a barred lenticular galaxy that is apparently attached to one of NGC 7753's spiral arms. They resemble the Whirlpool Galaxy (M51A) and its satellite NGC 5195 (M51B).

== Supernovae ==
Five supernovae have been observed in NGC 7753:

- SN 2006A (type unknown, mag. 18.1) was discovered by Tom Boles on 2 January 2006.
- SN 2006ch (Type Ia, mag. 16.5) was discovered by Kōichi Itagaki on 9 May 2006.
- SN 2013Q (Type Ia, mag. 17.5) was discovered by Zhijian Xu and Xing Gao, and independently by Alessandro Dimai, on 25 January 2013.
- SN 2015ae (Type II, mag. 17.3) was discovered by Kōichi Itagaki on 6 August 2015.
- SN 2025kyg (Type Ia, mag. 15.7277) was discovered by the Automatic Learning for the Rapid Classification of Events (ALeRCE) on 21 May 2025.

== See also ==
- Dwingeloo 1
- Dwingeloo 2
- List of NGC objects (7001–7840)
