= Dwingeloo =

- Village
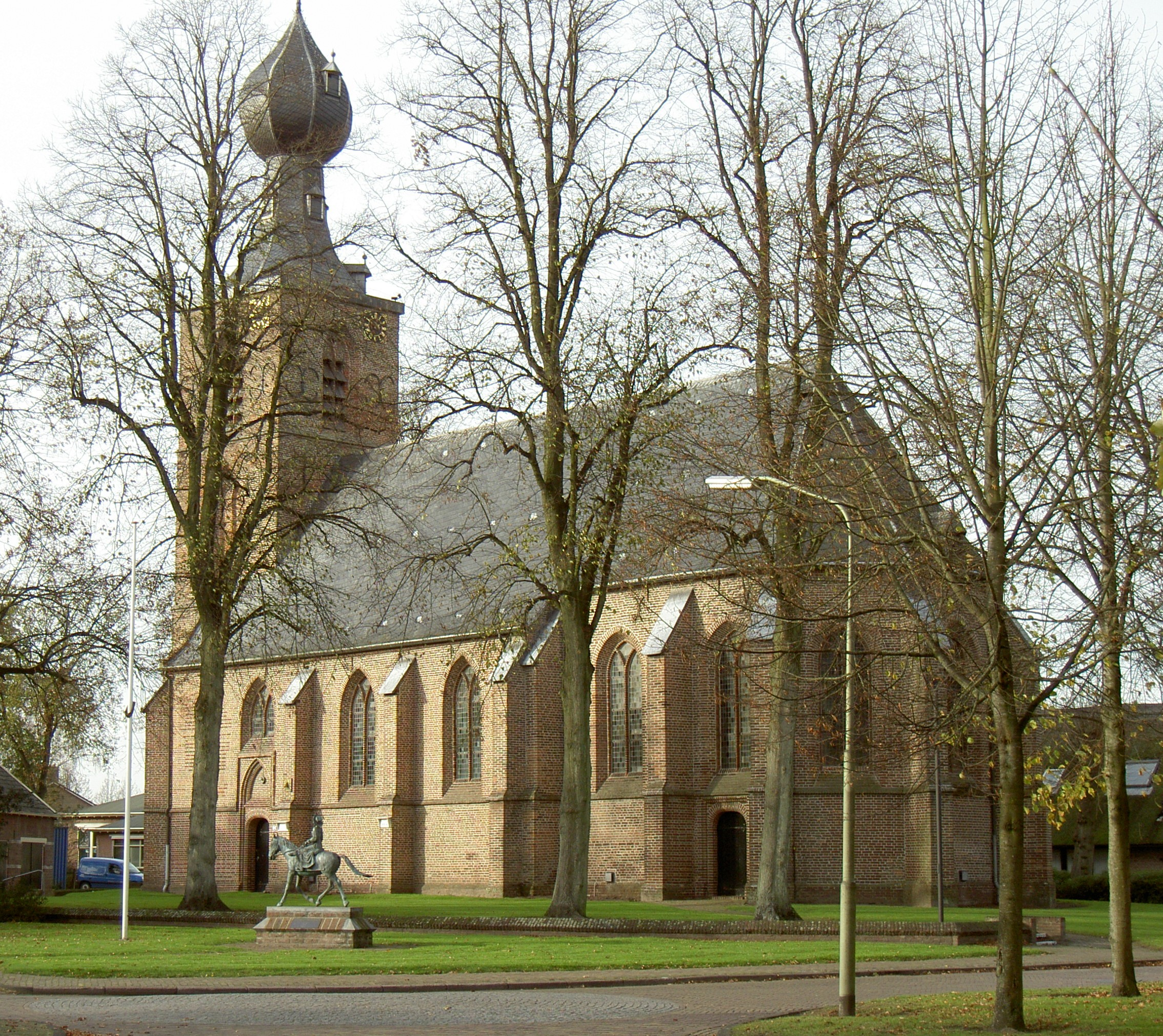
- Sint Nicolaaskerk

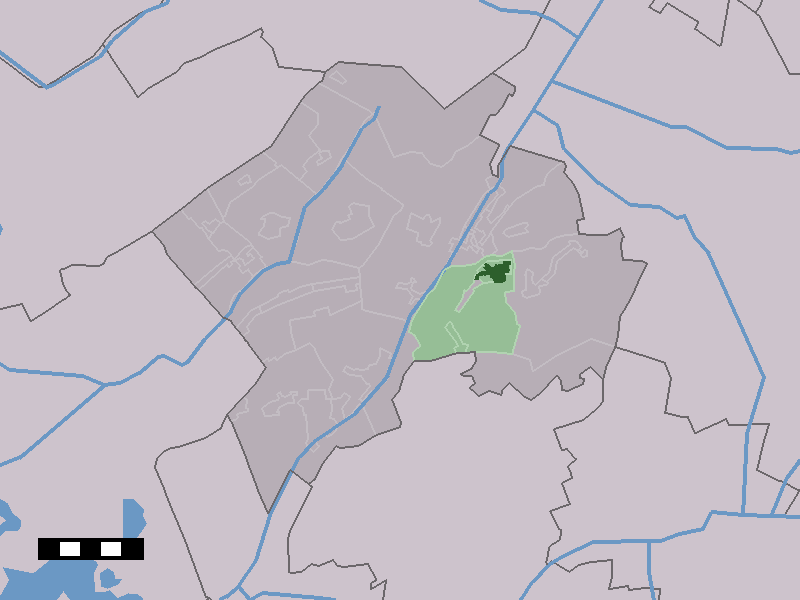
- The town centre (dark green) and the statistical district (light green) of Dwingeloo in the municipality of Westerveld.

- Location in the province of Drenthe Dwingeloo (Netherlands)
- Coordinates: 52°50′4″N 6°22′14″E
- Country: Netherlands
- Province: Drenthe
- Municipality: Westerveld

Area
  - Total: 19.15 km^{2} (7.39 sq mi)
- Elevation: 11 m (36 ft)

Population (2021)
  - Total: 2,580
  - Density: 135/km^{2} (349/sq mi)
- Time zone: UTC+1 (CET)
  - Summer (DST): UTC+2 (CEST)
- Postal code: 7991
- Dialing code: 0521

Dwingeloo (Dutch: [ˈdʋɪŋəloː]) is a village halfway between Meppel and Assen in the Dutch province of Drenthe. It is a part of the municipality of Westerveld.

The village is known internationally because of the radio telescope of the Dwingeloo Radio Observatory (which at the time of its completion in 1956 was the largest radio telescope in the world), located on the edge of the Dwingeloo Heath, 3 km south of the village. The telescope discovered Dwingeloo 1 and Dwingeloo 2, two galaxies about 10 million light-years away from the Earth in the constellation Cassiopeia.

== History ==
The village was first mentioned in 1181 as Twingelo. The etymology is unclear. Dwingeloo is an esdorp which developed in the Early Middle Ages. The church is located on the north side of a large village square which contained a drinking water pool.

The Dutch Reformed church was built in the 15th century as a replacement of the medieval church which had a detached tower. The union shaped crown has been placed on top the tower in 1631 after the old spire had collapsed. The church was damaged by a village fire in 1923, and was restored between 1923 and 1925.

The havezate (manor house) Westrup is one of the four havezates of Dwingeloo, and the only one which has remained intact. It was built around 1600, and enlarged in 1740. It received a neoclassic facade and an extra floor in 1870. Between 1984 and 1986, it was restored and is used as an office building.

Dwingeloo was a separate municipality until 1998, when it became a part of Westerveld.

== Gallery ==
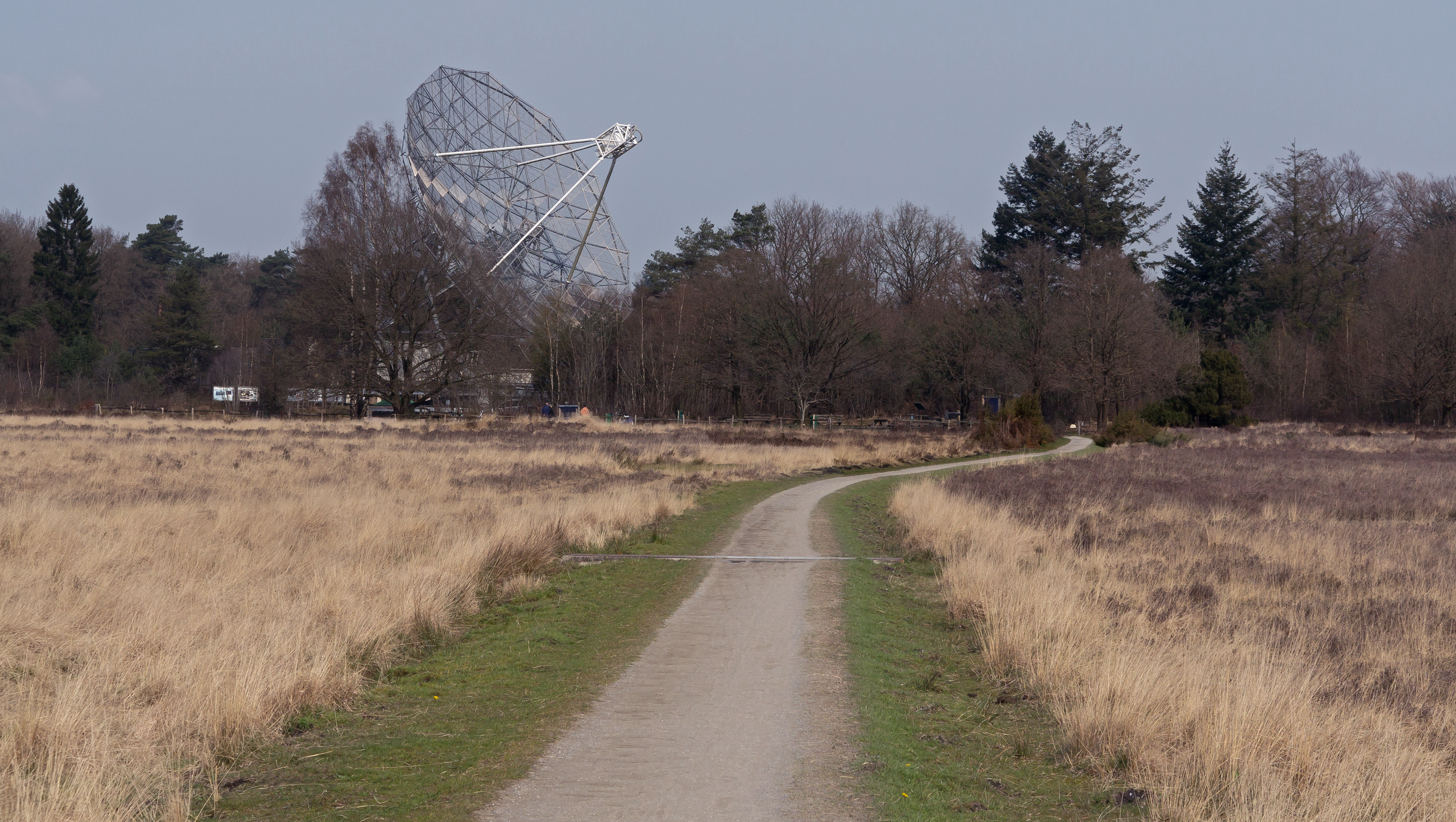
Dwingelderveld, the radio telescope

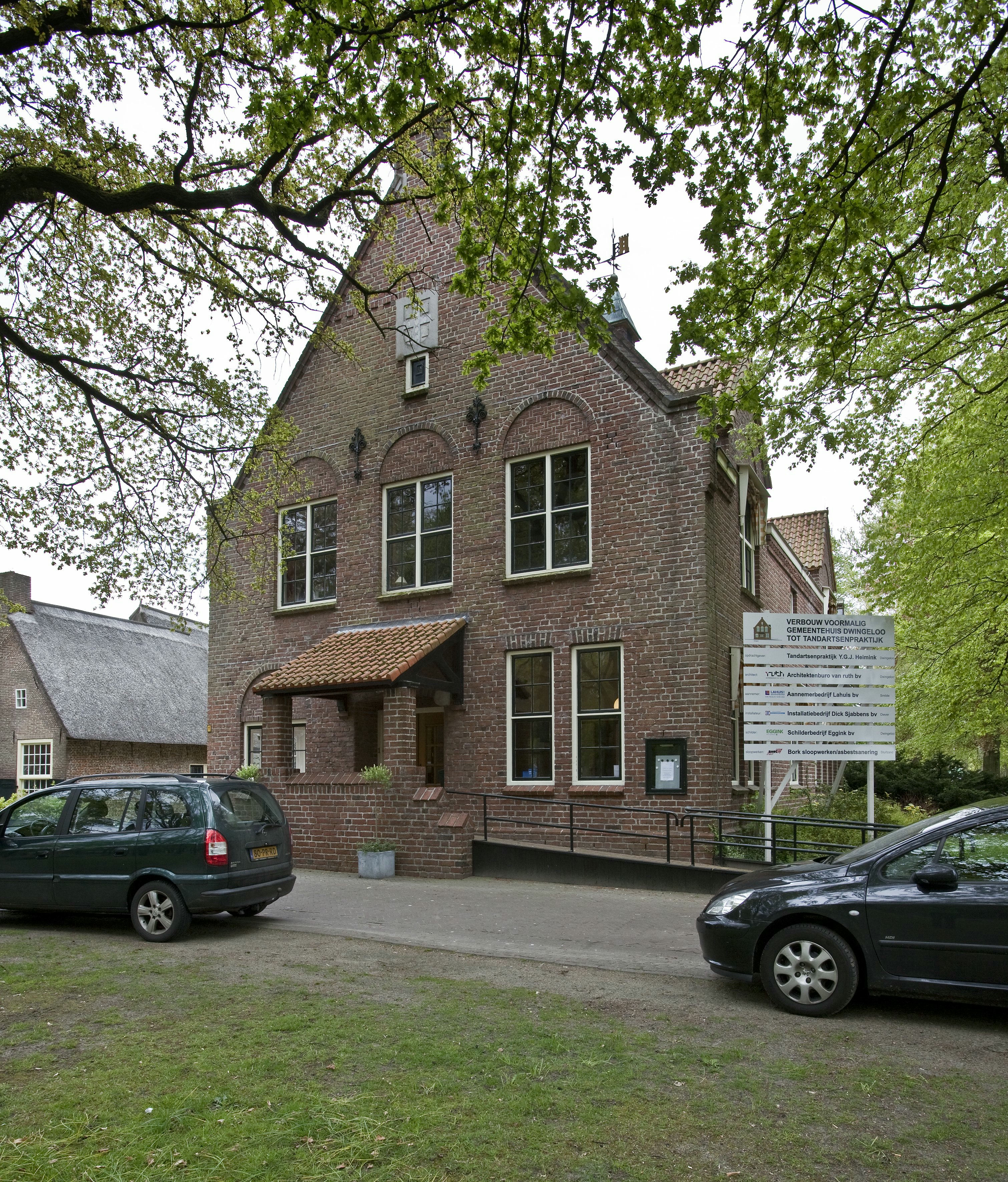
Former town hall

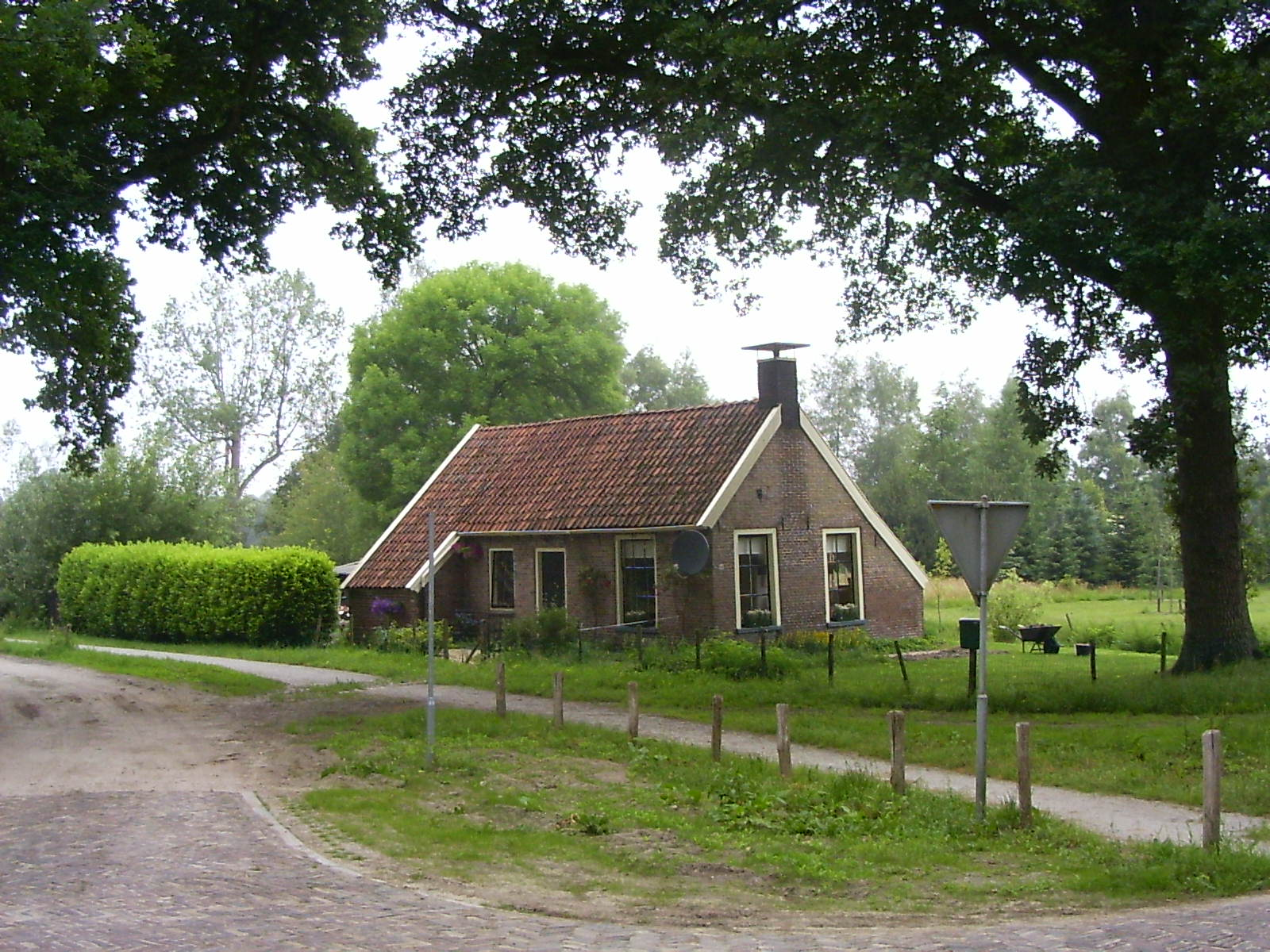
Little farm in Dwingeloo

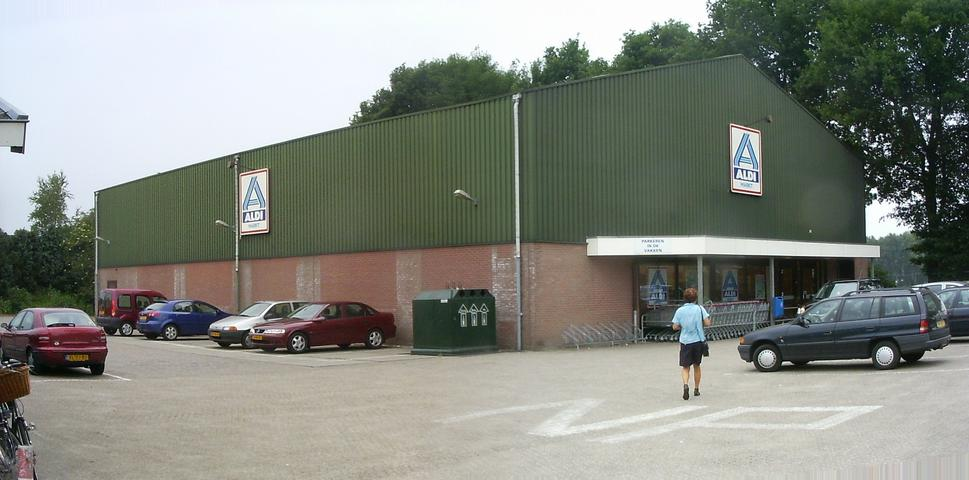
Supermarket
