= MB3 =

MB3 may refer to:

- MB 3, a dwarf galaxy
- Thomas-Morse MB-3, biplane
- Moonbase 3, a British science fiction television programme in 1973
- MB3, mountain bike model manufactured by Bridgestone
- MB3, Molecular Biology, Biochemistry and Bioinformatics, Towson University Jess and Mildred Fisher College of Science and Mathematics
- MB3-number (e.g. MB3-214, MB3-529, etc.), any of several Microsoft#Business Division exams
- the Miki Berenyi Trio, a musical group
