= UGCA 86 =

Magellanic spiral galaxy in the constellation Camelopardalis

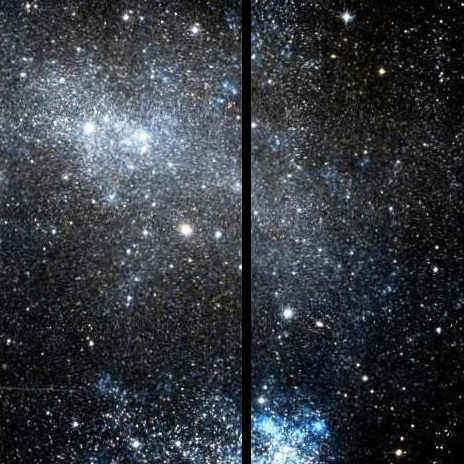
- UGCA 86 as taken by Hubble Space Telescope

Observation data (J2000 epoch)
- Constellation: Camelopardalis
- Right ascension: 03^{h} 59^{m} 50.5^{s}
- Declination: +67° 08′ 37″
- Redshift: 67 ± 4 km/s
- Distance: 9.72 ± 0.91 Mly (2.98 ± 0.28 Mpc)
- Apparent magnitude (V): 13.5
- Absolute magnitude (V): −17.0

Characteristics
- Type: Im
- Apparent size (V): 5.0′ × 3.0′

Other designations
- PGC 14241

UGCA 86 is a Magellanic spiral galaxy. It was first thought to be part of the Local Group, but after the brightest stars in the galaxy were observed, it became clear that it was located in the IC 342/Maffei Group. UGCA 86 is thought to be a satellite galaxy of IC 342, however the separation between the two galaxies is over 50% larger than the distance between the Milky Way and the Magellanic Clouds.
