= Maffei 1 =

Giant Elliptical galaxy in the constellation Cassiopeia

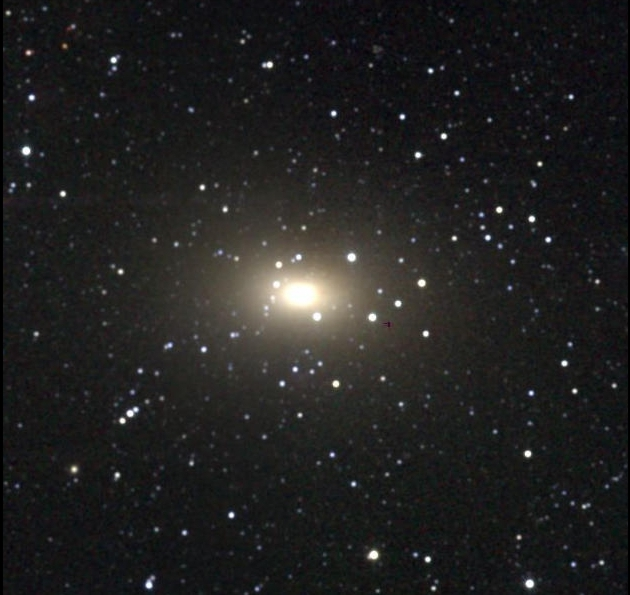

Observation data (J2000 epoch)
- Constellation: Cassiopeia
- Right ascension: 02^{h} 36^{m} 35.4^{s}
- Declination: +59° 39′ 19″
- Heliocentric radial velocity: 66.4 ± 5.0 km/s
- Distance: 2.85 ± 0.36 Mpc; 4.4^{+0.6}_{−0.5} Mpc
- Apparent magnitude (V): 11.14 ± 0.06 (V-band)

Characteristics
- Type: S0^{−} pec, E3
- Size: 75,000 ly (23,000 parsecs)
- Apparent size (V): 3′.36 × 1′.68

Other designations
- PGC 9892, UGCA 034 Sharpless 191

Maffei 1 is a massive elliptical galaxy near the constellation borders between Perseus and Cassiopeia, located 9.8 million light years away. Once believed to be a member of the Local Group of galaxies, it is now known to belong to a separate group, the IC 342/Maffei Group. It was named after Paolo Maffei, who discovered it and the neighboring Maffei 2 in 1967 via their infrared emissions.

Maffei 1 is a slightly flattened core type elliptical galaxy. It has a boxy shape and is made mainly of old metal-rich stars. It has a tiny blue nucleus in which stars continue to form. Like all large ellipticals it contains a significant population of globular clusters. Maffei 1 is situated at an estimated distance of 3–4 Mpc from the Milky Way. It may be the closest giant elliptical galaxy.

Maffei 1 lies in the Zone of Avoidance and is heavily obscured by the Milky Way's stars and dust. If it were not obscured, it would be one of the largest (about 3/4 the size of the full moon), brightest, and best-known galaxies in the sky. It can be observed visually, using a 30–35 cm or bigger telescope under a very dark sky.

== Discovery ==
The Italian astronomer Paolo Maffei was one of the pioneers of infrared astronomy. In the 1950s and 60s, in order to obtain high quality images of celestial objects in the very near infrared part of the spectrum (the I-band, 680–880 nm), he used chemically hyper-sensitized standard Eastman emulsions I-N. (Note: "Eastman emulsions I-N" refers to a type of photographic plate produced by Eastman Kodak in the 20th century. They were sensitive in the very near part of the infrared spectrum and at that time widely used for astronomical observations. However they required long exposure times and were often hyper-sensitized.) To achieve the hyper-sensitization he immersed them in 5% ammonia solution for 3–5 minutes. This procedure increased their sensitivity by an order of magnitude. Between 1957 and 1967 Maffei observed many different objects using this technique, including globular clusters and planetary nebulae. Some of those objects were not visible at all on blue light (250–500 nm) sensitive plates.

The galaxy Maffei 1 was discovered on a hyper-sensitized I-N photographic plate exposed on 29 September 1967 with the Schmidt telescope at Asiago Observatory. Maffei found Maffei 1, together with its companion spiral galaxy Maffei 2, while searching for diffuse nebulae and T Tauri stars. The object had an apparent size up to 50″ in the near infrared but was not visible on the corresponding blue light sensitive plate. Its spectrum lacked any emission or absorption lines. Later it was shown to be radio-quiet as well. In 1970 Hyron Spinrad suggested that Maffei 1 is a nearby heavily obscured giant elliptical galaxy. Maffei 1 would be among the ten brightest galaxies in the northern sky if not situated behind the Milky Way.

== Distance ==
Maffei 1 is located only 0.55° from the galactic plane in the middle of the Zone of Avoidance and suffers from about 4.7 magnitudes of extinction (a factor of about 1/70) in visible light. In addition to extinction, observation of Maffei 1 is further hindered by the fact that it is covered by myriads of faint Milky Way stars, which can easily be confused with its own. As a result, determining its distance has been particularly difficult.

In 1971, soon after its discovery, Hyron Spinrad estimated the distance to Maffei 1 at about 1 Mpc, which would place it within the Local Group of galaxies. In 1983 this estimate was revised up to 2.1^{+1.3}_{−0.8} Mpc by Ronald Buta and Marshall McCall using the general relation between the luminosity and velocity dispersion for elliptical galaxies. That distance puts Maffei 1 well outside the Local Group, but close enough to have influenced it in the past.

In 1993 Gerard Luppino and John Tonry used surface brightness fluctuations to derive a new distance estimate to Maffei 1 of 4.15 ± 0.5 Mpc. Later in 2001, Tim Davidge and Sidney van den Bergh used adaptive optics to observe the brightest asymptotic giant branch stars in Maffei 1 and concluded that it is located at the distance 4.4^{+0.6}_{−0.5} Mpc from the Sun. The latest determination of the distance to Maffei 1, which is based on the re-calibrated luminosity/velocity dispersion relation for the elliptical galaxies and the updated extinction, is 2.85 ± 0.36 Mpc, or over 9 million light years away. For perspective, the nearby Andromeda Galaxy is estimated to be about 2.5 million light years away.

The larger (≥3 Mpc) distances reported in the past 20 years would imply that Maffei 1 has never been close enough to the Local Group to significantly influence its dynamics.

Maffei 1 moves away from the Sun at the speed of about 66 km/s. Its velocity relative to the Local Group's center of mass is, however, 297 km/s away. That means that Maffei 1 participates in the general expansion of the Universe.

== Physical properties ==
=== Size and shape ===
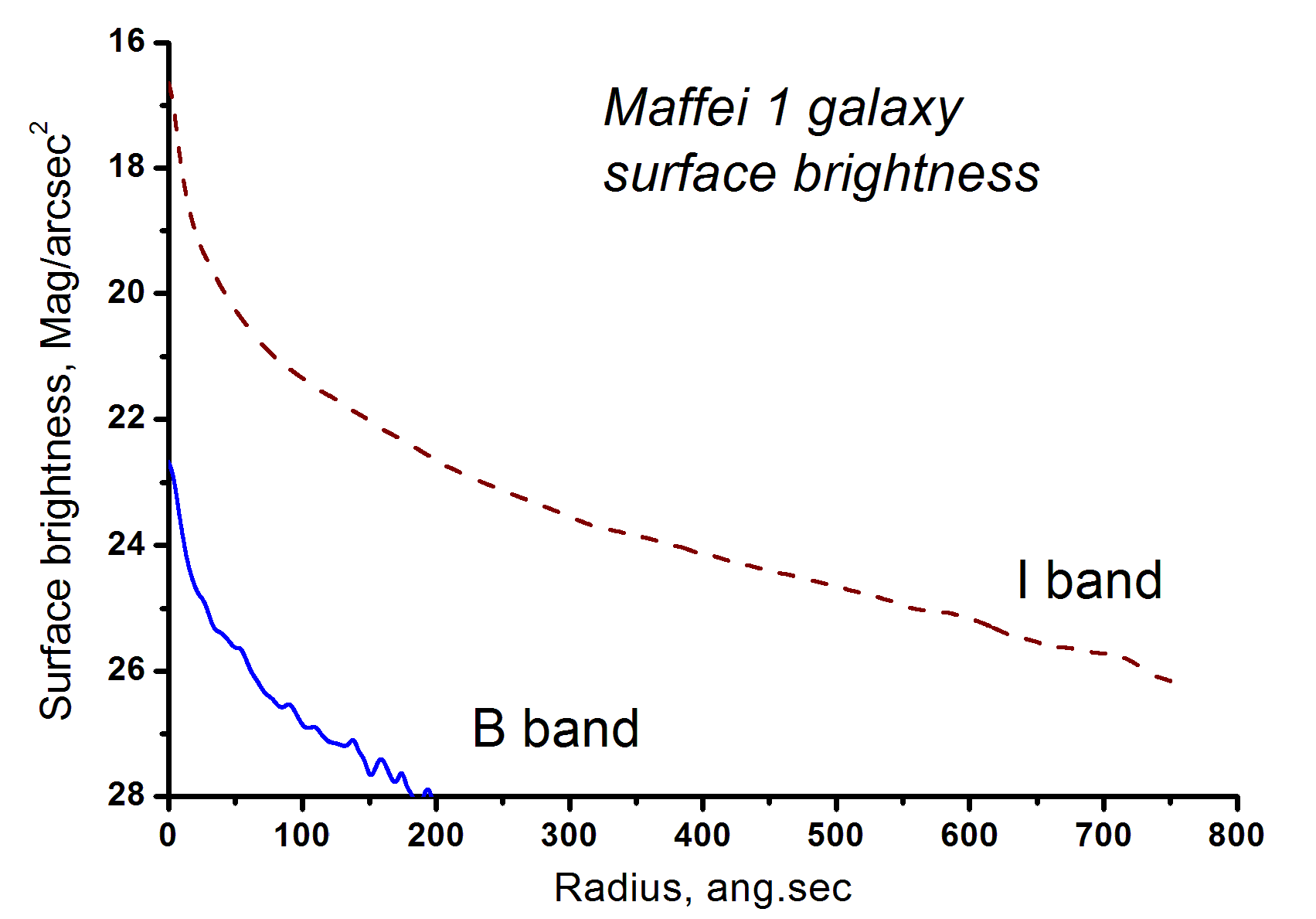
The surface brightness profile of Maffei 1 in the blue (B-band) and near infrared (I-band) light

Maffei 1 is a massive elliptical galaxy classified as type E3 in the Hubble classification scheme. This means that it is slightly flattened, its semi-minor axis being 70% of its semi-major axis. Maffei 1 has also a boxy shape (E(b)3 type), while its central region (radius ≈ 34 pc) is deficient in light emission as compared to the r^{1/4} law, (Note: The r^{1/4} law refers to an empirical relation describing how the surface brightness of an elliptical galaxy varies along its radius. It takes the following form: $\mu=A+Br^{1/4}$, where r is radius, μ is the surface brightness (in mag/arsec^{2}), while A and B are empirical constants.) meaning that Maffei 1 is a core type elliptical. Both the boxy shape and the presence of an underluminous core are typical of intermediate to massive ellipticals.

The apparent dimensions of Maffei 1 depend strongly on the wavelength of light because of the heavy obscuration by the Milky Way. In blue light it is 1–2′ across while in the near infrared its major axis reaches 23′—more than 3/4 of the Moon's diameter. At a distance of 3 Mpc this corresponds to approximately 23 kpc. The total visible absolute magnitude of Maffei 1, M_{V}=−20.8, is comparable to that of the Milky Way.

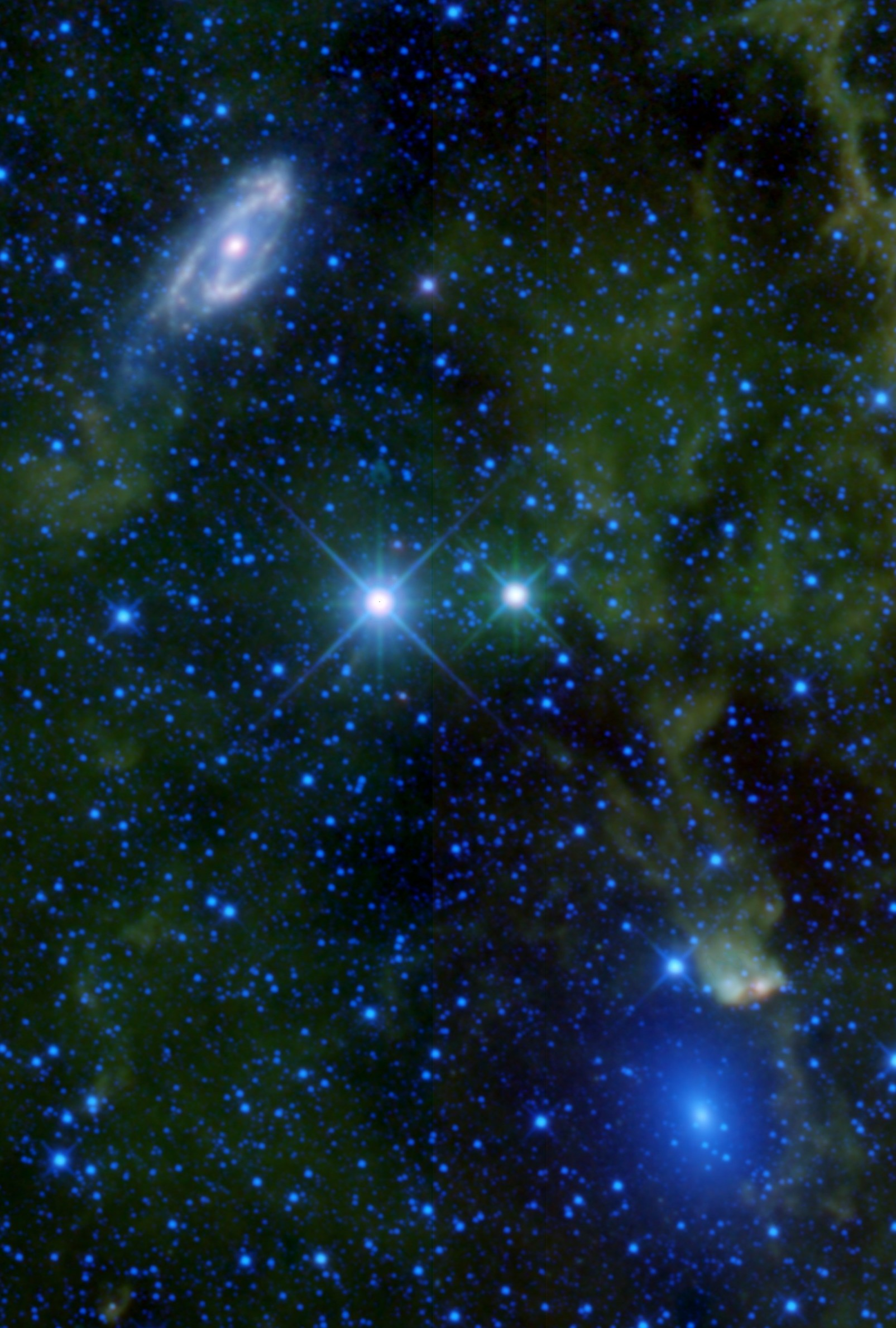
Maffei 1 is the bluish elliptical object near the bottom-right corner. Maffei 2 is the intermediate spiral galaxy located near the top of the image

=== Nucleus ===
Maffei 1 possesses a tiny blue nucleus at its center approximately 1.2 pc across. It contains about 29 solar masses of ionized hydrogen. This implies that it has undergone recent star formation. There are no signs of an active galactic nucleus (AGN) in the center of Maffei 1. The X-ray emission from the center is extended and likely comes from a number of stellar sources.

=== Stars and stellar clusters ===
Maffei 1 is mainly made of old metal-rich stars more than 10 billion years in age. As a large elliptical galaxy, Maffei 1 is expected to host a significant population of globular clusters (about 1100). However, due to heavy intervening absorption, ground-based observations for a long time failed to identify any of them. Observations by the Hubble Space Telescope in 2000 revealed about 20 globular cluster candidates in the central region of the galaxy. Later infrared observations from telescopes on the ground also found a population of bright globular cluster candidates.

== Group membership ==
Maffei 1 is a principal member of a nearby group of galaxies. The group's other members are the giant spiral galaxies IC 342 and Maffei 2. Maffei 1 has also a small satellite spiral galaxy, Dwingeloo 1, as well as a number of dwarf satellites like MB1. The IC 342/Maffei Group is one of the closest galaxy groups to the Milky Way galaxy.
