= Dwingeloo Radio Observatory =

Radio telescope in the Netherlands

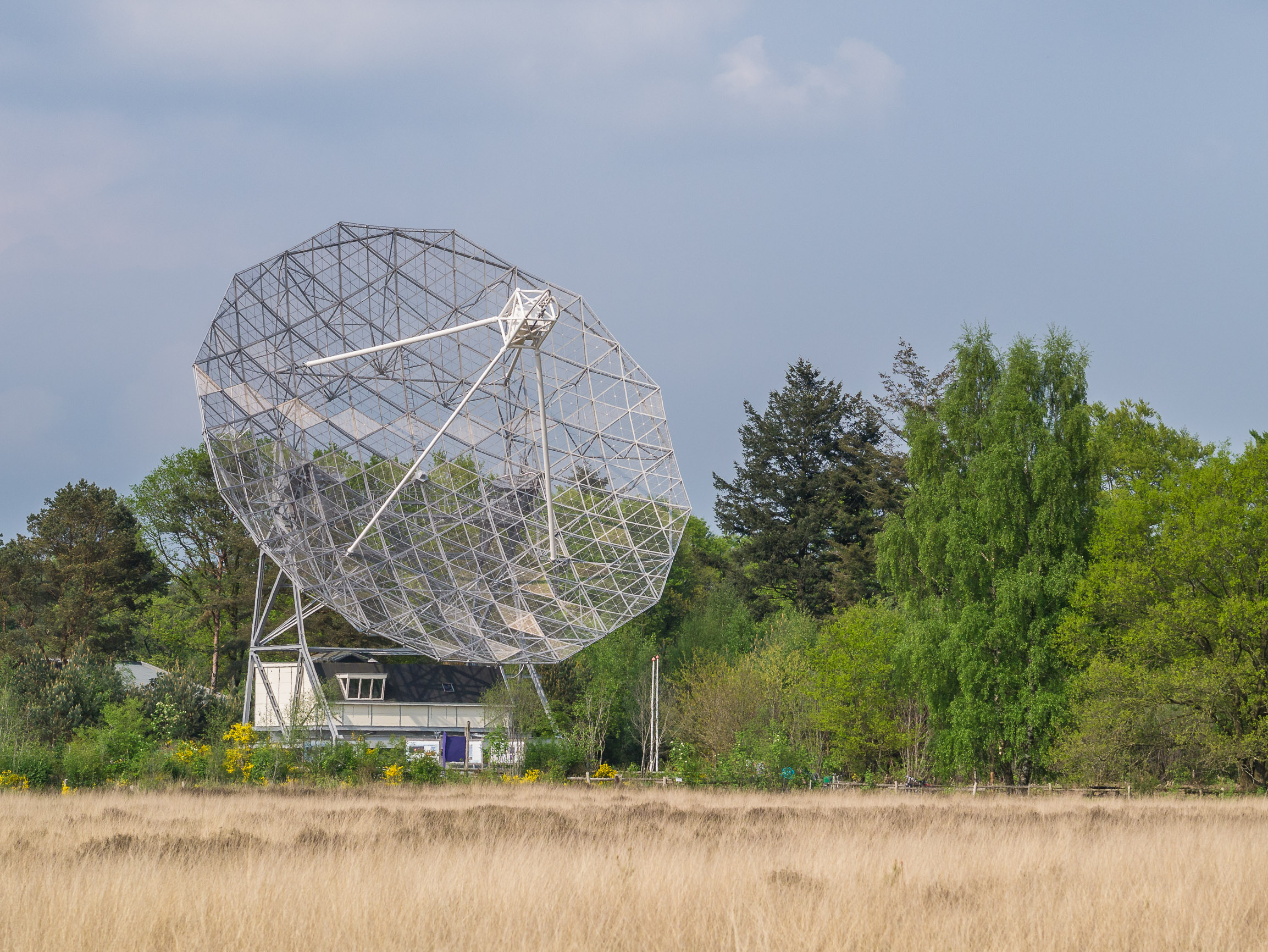
- The 25 meter Dwingeloo radio telescope in 2014
- Part of: Top 100 of Dutch monuments 1940-1958
- Location(s): Dwingeloo, Drenthe, Netherlands
- Coordinates: 52°48′43″N 6°23′46″E
- Organization: CAMRAS
- Diameter: 25 m (82 ft 0 in)
- Location of Dwingeloo Radio Observatory
- Related media on Commons

The Dwingeloo Radio Observatory is a single-dish radio telescope near the village of Dwingeloo (Dutch pronunciation: [ˈdʋɪŋəloː]) in the northeastern Netherlands. Construction started in 1954, and the telescope was completed in 1956. The radio telescope has a diameter of 25 meters. At the time of completion it was the largest radio telescope in the world, but it was overtaken in 1957 by the 250 foot (76 m) Lovell Telescope.

As of 2000, it was no longer in operation in an official capacity. Since August 2009, the radio telescope has been a national heritage site (rijksmonument). The telescope dish was removed for restoration in June 2012. The "C.A. Muller Radio Astronomy Station" foundation ("CAMRAS" for short) restored the telescope to working order. The dish was remounted in November 2012.

Radio amateurs along with amateur and professional astronomers, use the telescope for projects, one being Earth–Moon–Earth communication, also known as moonbounce, which allows for people on different parts of Earth to communicate via the Moon. In this technique, radio wave signals are aimed at the Moon by one location, bounce off the Moon's surface, and are detected by an antenna at a different location on Earth. "Visual Moonbounce" is a technology to moonbounce images at amateur-radio frequencies. It is based on artistic research with the Dwingeloo Radiotelescoop by artist Daniela De Paulis as part of her project "OPTICKS"

The radio telescope is owned by ASTRON, the Netherlands Institute for Radio Astronomy. The site of the Dwingeloo Radio Observatory also houses most of the staff of ASTRON and a test site for the Low Frequency Array radio telescope, LOFAR.

Two galaxies are named after this telescope: Dwingeloo 1 and Dwingeloo 2.
