= NGC 1560 =

Galaxy in the constellation Camelopardalis

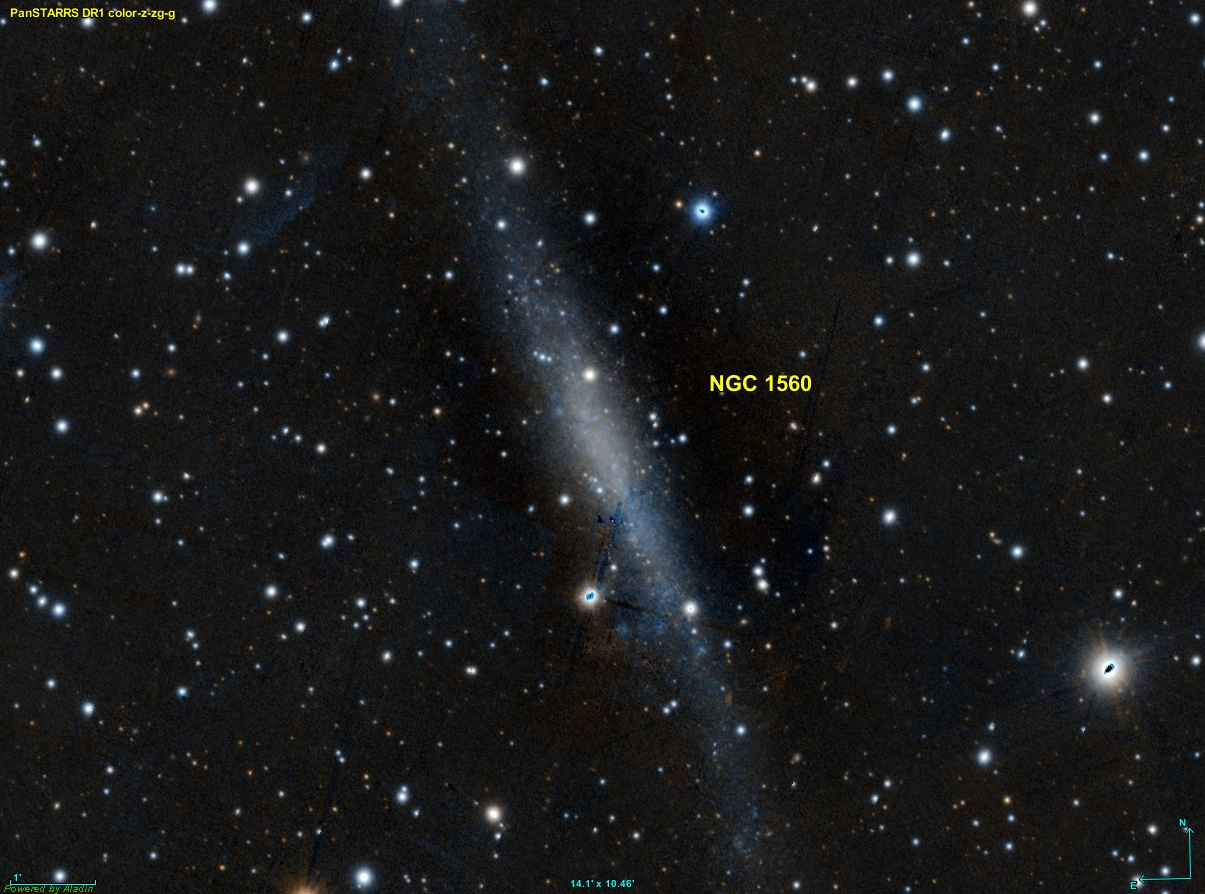
- Pan-STARRS image of NGC 1560

Observation data (J2000 epoch)
- Constellation: Camelopardalis
- Right ascension: 04^{h} 32^{m} 49.09^{s}
- Declination: +71° 52′ 59.2″
- Redshift: −0.000123
- Heliocentric radial velocity: −37 ± 6 km/s
- Distance: 9.75 ± 0.33 Mly (2.99 ± 0.10 Mpc)
- Apparent magnitude (V): 9.82
- Absolute magnitude (V): −17.7

Characteristics
- Type: SA(s)d
- Size: 36,023 ly (11.05 kpc) (estimated)

Other designations
- IC 2062, UGC 3060, MCG +12-05-005, PGC 15488

NGC 1560, also known as IC 2062, is an 11th-magnitude spiral galaxy, in the IC 342/Maffei Group. It was discovered by Wilhelm Tempel on August 1, 1883.

The galaxy has a negative radial velocity of -35 km/second. NGC1560 is close enough to the Earth that its distance must be derived directly (not using redshift). Karachentsev et al. (2003) report a distance of 3.45 Mpc (11.2 million light years), while Madore (1993) give 2.5 Mpc (8.1 Mly) using the brightest stars method. Currently, the most accurate estimate is approximately 8 to 12 million light years. At this distance, it is relatively close to Earth, but not part of the Local Group.

This galaxy is approximately 35 thousand light years wide, determined by its apparent size of 11.6 by 1.9 arcminutes.
