= MB 3 =

Spheroidal dwarf galaxy

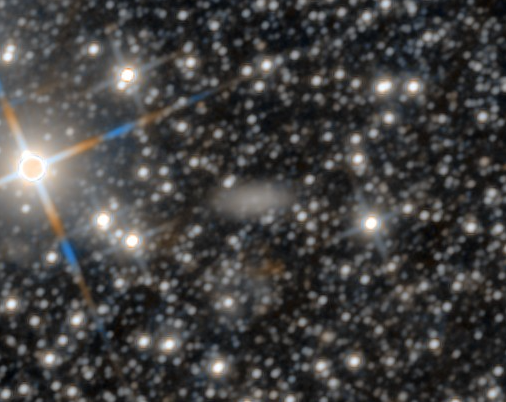

Observation data (J2000 epoch)
- Constellation: Cassiopeia
- Right ascension: 02^{h} 55^{m} 42.7^{s}
- Declination: +58° 51′ 37″
- Distance: ~10 Mly (~ 3 Mpc)
- Group or cluster: IC 342/Maffei
- Apparent magnitude (V): 17.33 (V-band)

Characteristics
- Type: dSph
- Apparent size (V): ~ 1.9′
- Notable features: Companion of Dwingeloo 1

Other designations
- 2MASX J02554290+5851394, KK98-021, PGC 166069

MB 3 is a dwarf spheroidal galaxy discovered in 1997 and located about 10 million light-years away from the Earth. It was discovered during an optical survey of the IC 342/Maffei group to which the galaxy is a member. MB3 is a companion galaxy of Dwingeloo 1 and situated in the Zone of Avoidance. MB 3 is thought to be a member of the IC 342/Maffei Group, a galaxy group adjacent to the Local Group.

The visible diameter of MB 3 is approximately 1.9′, which at the distance of 3 Mpc corresponds to about 2 kpc. In optical images it appears as a highly flattened diffuse oval located approximately 9.2′ to the southwest of Dwingeloo 1. No neutral or molecular hydrogen has been detected in it, which is consistent with its classification as a dwarf spheroidal galaxy.
