= Vela Supercluster =

Supercluster in the constellation Vela

Observation data (Epoch J2000.0)
- Constellation(s): Vela, Antlia, Pyxis
- Right ascension: 09^{h} 22^{m} 43^{s}
- Declination: −50° 07′ 08″
- Major axis: 115 Mpc (375 Mly) h^{−1}_{~0.676} (Hubble constant based on 2016 Planck data)
- Minor axis: 115 Mpc (375 Mly) h^{−1}_{~0.676} (Hubble constant based on 2016 Planck data)
- Redshift: 18 000 km/s
- Distance: 265.5 Mpc (866 Mly) h^{−1}_{~0.676} (Hubble constant based on 2016 Planck data)
- Binding mass: 1 × 10^{15} M_{☉}

The Vela Supercluster (Vela SCl, VSCL) is a massive galactic supercluster about 265.5 megaparsecs (870 million light-years) away within the vicinity of the Zone of Avoidance, centered on the constellation Vela. It is one of the largest structures found in the universe, covering about 25 × 20 degrees of the sky. It consists of two walls: a broad main wall and a secondary merging wall. The combined dimensions of the walls are 115 km/s Mpc on the major dimensions and 90 km/s Mpc on the minor ones, which corresponds to about 385 million and 300 million light years, respectively. It is about 1,000 times the mass of the Milky Way galaxy, which corresponds to a mass of 1 × 10^{15} M_{☉}. About 20 initial galaxy clusters have been identified spectroscopically.

== Supercluster ==
The supercluster's discovery was reported in December 2016 by Kraan-Korteweg et al. through an analysis of the redshifts of 4500 galaxies from the combined data of the 2dF Galaxy Redshift Survey which uses the AAOmega fiber optics from the Anglo-Australian Observatory (AAO), and the South African Large Telescope (SALT).

The supercluster is located in a region obstructed by the view of the Milky Way's disc due to our position inside the disc. This region is known colloquially as the Zone of Avoidance. Hence, the supercluster can only be studied at longer wavelengths (infrared, microwave, radio) which can pass through the gases and dust of the Milky Way disc.

The paper reporting the discovery describes the supercluster as Terra incognita (Latin for "unknown land"), "an unknown great continent in the nearby Universe whose outline we are only beginning to discern." More comprehensive surveys in the future, such as the Taipan Galaxy Surveys, are expected to provide additional data about the supercluster.

== See also ==
- CfA2 Great Wall
- Norma Cluster
- Virgo Supercluster
- List of largest cosmic structures
