= Christiaan Alexander Muller =

Dutch radio astronomer (1923–2004)

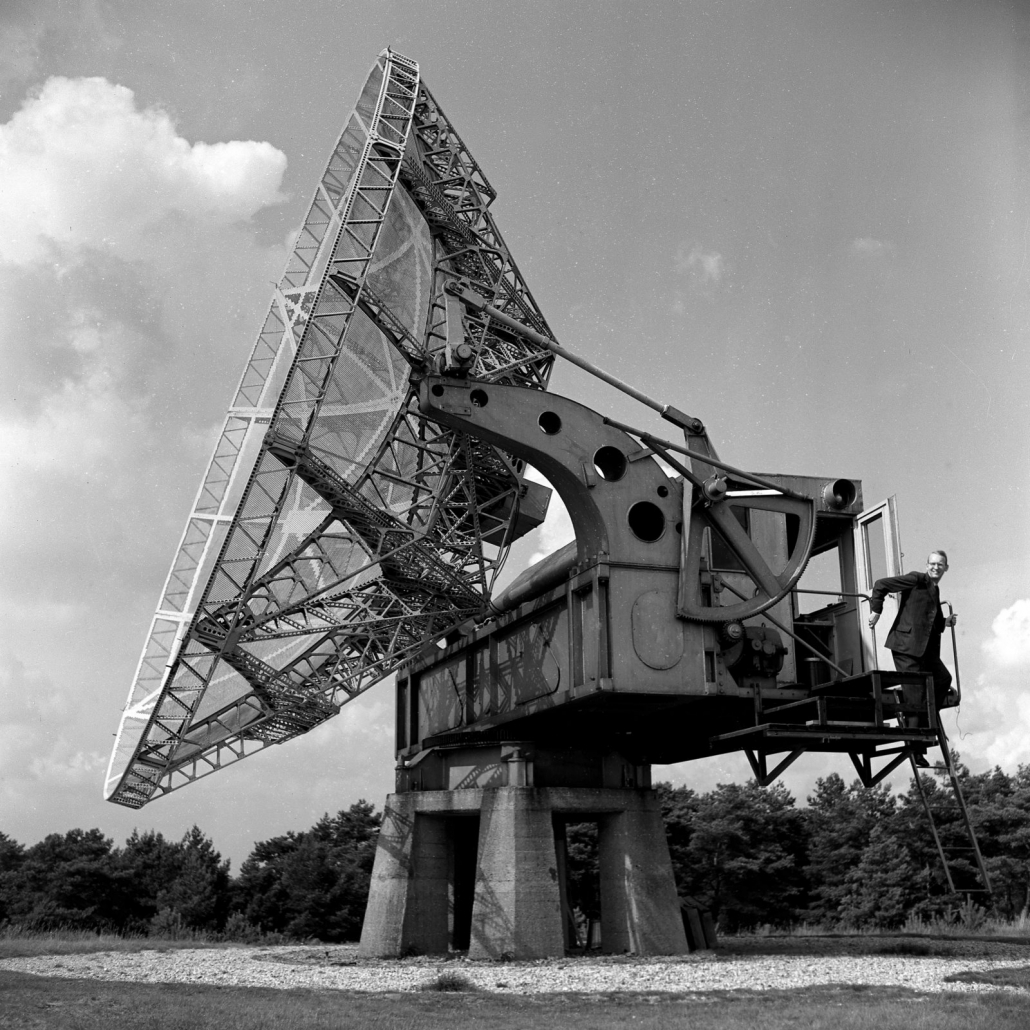
- Lex Muller (right) descending the ladder of the 7.5 m Kootwijk radio telescope (converted German Würzburg radar dish), the Netherlands, around 1951.
- Born: 18 April 1923; Alkmaar, the Netherlands
- Died: 8 August 2004 (aged 81)
- Education: Engineering Physics
- Alma mater: Delft Institute of Technology, 1950
- Known for: Determination of the spiral structure of the Milky Way
- Scientific career
- Fields: Radio astronomy, Microwave technology
- Institutions: Kootwijk radio telescope, Dwingeloo Radio Observatory, Westerbork Synthesis Radio Telescope, Leiden University, University of Twente

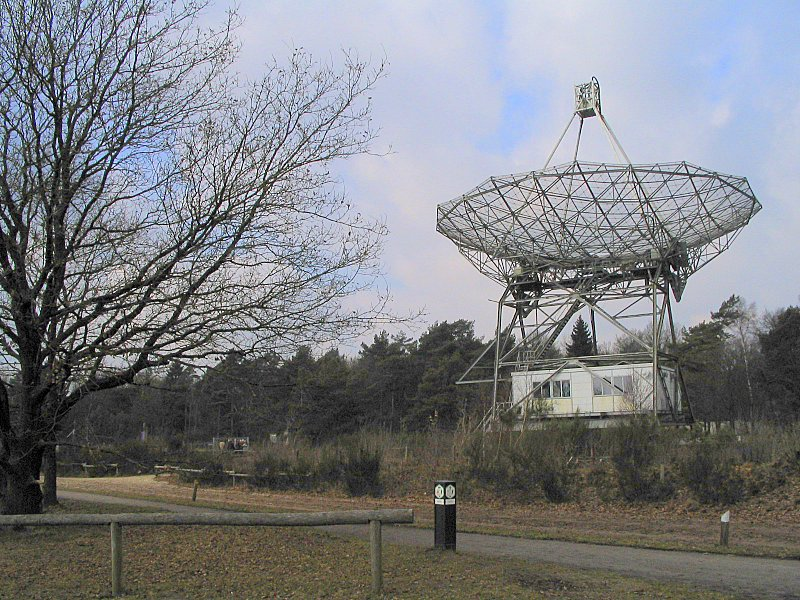
Dwingeloo Radio Observatory, inaugurated in 1956 and used for research up to 2000. Photo 2006.

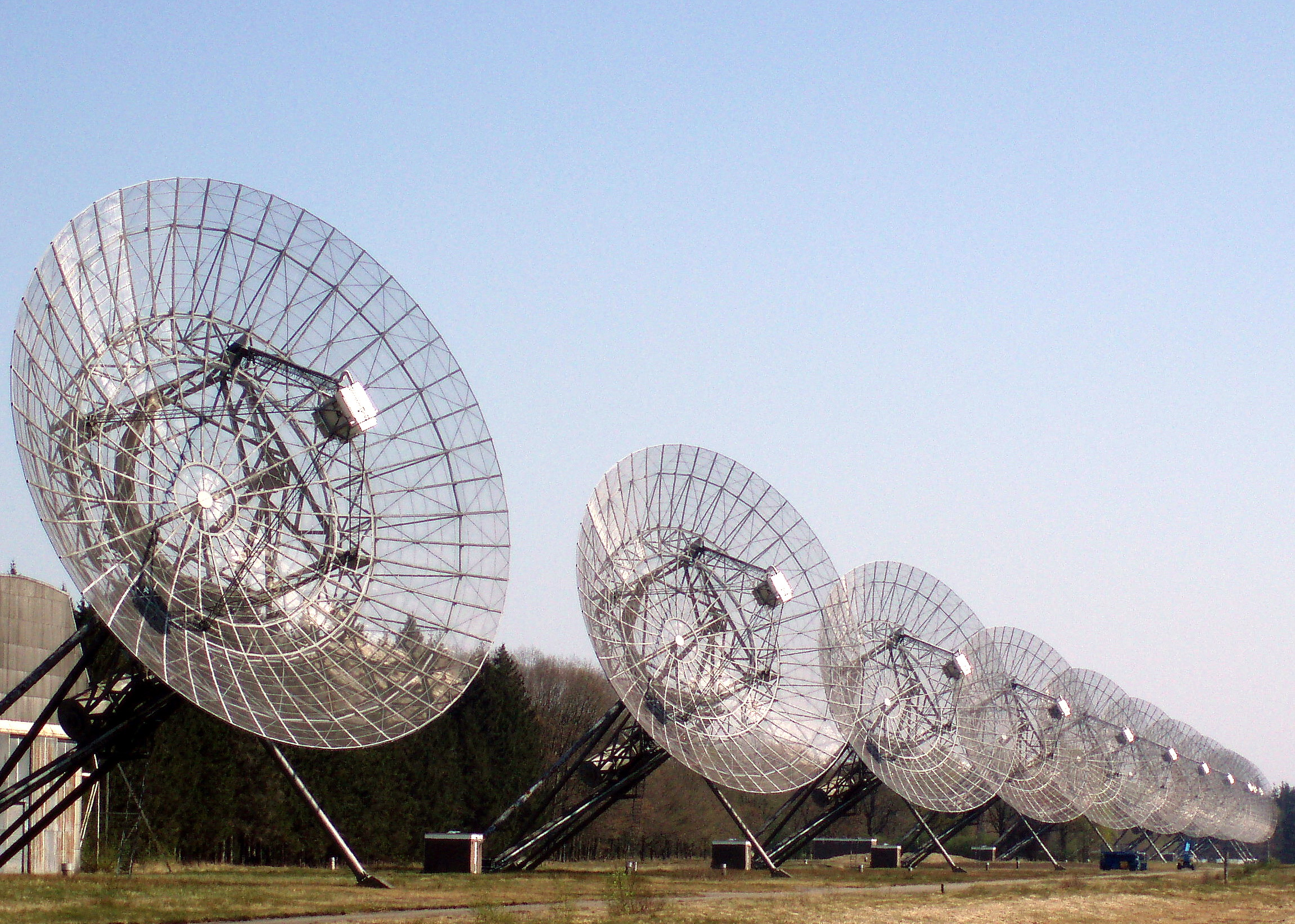
Westerbork Synthesis Radio Telescope, 2007.

Christiaan Alexander "Lex" Muller (Alkmaar, the Netherlands, 18 April 1923 — Delden, The Netherlands, 8 August 2004) was a Dutch radio engineer, radio astronomer and professor at Leiden University and the University of Twente. As the chief engineer he pioneered Dutch radio astronomy with the radio telescopes of Kootwijk, Dwingeloo (Dwingeloo Radio Observatory), and Westerbork (Westerbork Synthesis Radio Telescope), where he designed the receiver system. Because of his work with Dutch astronomer Jan Oort on the determination of the spiral structure of the Milky Way using the 21 cm hydrogen radio line emission observed with the Kootwijk telescope, he was nominated for the Nobel Prize in Physics in 1956, 1957, 1958, and 1961 by Swedish astronomer Bertil Lindblad and Karl Ingve Öhman.

Muller was a professor with the Astronomy department at Leiden University from 1959 to 1972 in the field of Microwave technology and its application in astronomy, physics and chemistry (Dutch: Techniek van de microgolven en hun toepassing in de sterrenkunde, natuurkunde en scheikunde), where he mentored two PhD students, Wim Brouw and Jaap van Nieuwkoop. His inaugural address of 2 June 1961 was entitled Microwave technology in astronomy (original Dutch: De microgolftechniek in de sterrenkunde). He moved to the department of Electrical engineering (Elektrotechniek) at the University of Twente, where he taught Microwave technology from 1971 up to 1984.

== Publications ==
Muller's publications include:

- Muller, C. A.; Oort, J. H. (September 1951). "Observation of a Line in the Galactic Radio Spectrum: The Interstellar Hydrogen Line at 1,420 Mc./sec., and an Estimate of Galactic Rotation". Nature. 168 (4270): 357–358. doi:10.1038/168357a0.
- de Jager, C.; Minnaert, M.; Muller, C. A. (September 1951). "Absence of Hydrogen Radiation of Wavelength 21 cm. in the Sun". Nature. 168 (4270): 391. doi:10.1038/168391b0.
- Oort, J. H.; Muller, C. A. (1952). "Spiral Structure and Interstellar Emission". Monthly Notes of the Astronomical Society of South Africa. 11: 65.
- Muller, C. A. (May 1957). "21-CM Absorption Effects in the Spectra of Two Strong Radio Sources". Astrophysical Journal. 125: 830. doi:10.1086/146361.
- Westerhout, Gart; Brouw, W. N.; Muller, C. A.; Tinbergen, J. (March 1962). "75-cm Galactic Background Polarization: Progress Report". Astronomical Journal. 67: 590. doi:10.1086/108852.
- Muller, C. A. (October 1963). "Galactic Background Polarization at 610 Mc/s". Nature. 200 (4902): 155–156. doi:10.1038/200155a0.
- Casse, J. L.; Muller, C. A. (March 1974). "The Synthesis Radio Telescope at Westerbork. The 21 CM Continuum Receiver System". Astronomy and Astrophysics. 31: 333.
- Muller, C. A. (1980). "Early galactic radio astronomy at Kootwijk". In van Woerden, Hugo; Brouw, Willem N.; van de Hulst, Henk C. (eds.). Oort and the Universe. A Sketch of Oort's Research and Person. Liber Amicorum Presented to Jan Hendrik Oort on the Occasion of his 80th Birthday, 28 April, 1980. Dordrecht: D. Reidel Publishing Company. p. 65.
