= IC 342/Maffei Group =

Galaxy cluster in the constellation of Cassiopeia

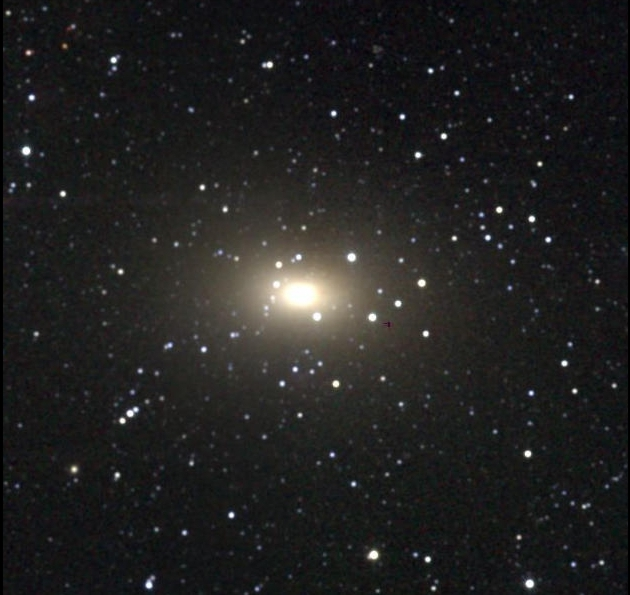
- Maffei 1, one of the brightest galaxies in the group

Observation data (Epoch J2000)
- Constellation: Cassiopeia/Camelopardalis/Perseus
- Brightest member: IC 342
- Number of galaxies: 16

Other designations
- IC 342 Group, Maffei 1 Group, LGG 104

The IC 342/Maffei Group (also known as the IC 342 Group or the Maffei 1 Group) corresponds to one or two galaxy groups close to the Local Group. The member galaxies are mostly concentrated around either IC 342 or Maffei 1, which would be the brightest two galaxies in the group. The group is part of the Virgo Supercluster, within Coma–Sculptor Cloud. However, recent studies have found that the two subgroups are unrelated; while the IC 342 group is the nearest galaxy group to the Milky Way, the Maffei 1 group is several times farther away, and is not gravitationally bound to the IC 342 group.

== Members ==
The table below lists galaxies that have been identified as associated with the IC342/Maffei 1 Group by I. D. Karachentsev. Note that Karachentsev divides this group into two subgroups centered around IC 342 and Maffei 1.

Members of the IC 342 Subgroup
Name	Type	R.A. (J2000)	Dec. (J2000)	Redshift (km/s)	Apparent Magnitude
Camelopardalis A	Irr	04^{h} 26^{m} 16.3^{s}	+72° 48′ 21″	–46 ± 1	14.8
Camelopardalis B	Irr	04^{h} 53^{m} 07.1^{s}	+67° 05′ 57″	77	16.1
IC 342	SAB(rs)cd	03^{h} 46^{m} 48.5^{s}	+68° 05′ 46″	31 ± 3	9.1
KK 35	Irr	03^{h} 45^{m} 12.6^{s}	+67° 51′ 51″	105 ± 1	17.2
KKH 22	dSph	03^{h} 44^{m} 56.6^{s}	+72° 03′ 52″	30 ± 10	15.3
NGC 1560	SA(s)d	04^{h} 32^{m} 49.1^{s}	+71° 52′ 59″	–36 ± 5	12.2
NGC 1569	Sbrst	04^{h} 30^{m} 49.1^{s}	+64° 50′ 52,6″	–104 ± 4	11.2
UGCA 86	Im	03^{h} 59^{m} 50.5^{s}	+67° 08′ 37″	67 ± 4	13.5
UGCA 92	Im	04^{h} 32^{m} 04.9^{s}	+63° 36′ 49.0″	–99 ± 5	13.8
UGCA 105	Im	05^{h} 14^{m} 15.3^{s}	+62° 34′ 48″	111 ± 5	13.9

Members of the Maffei 1 Subgroup
Name	Type	R.A. (J2000)	Dec. (J2000)	Redshift (km/s)	Apparent Magnitude
Dwingeloo 1	SB(s)cd	02^{h} 56^{m} 51.9^{s}	+58° 54′ 42″	110	8.3
Dwingeloo 2	Im	02^{h} 54^{m} 08.5^{s}	+59° 00′ 19″	94 ± 1	20.5
KKH 11	dE	02^{h} 24^{m} 34.2^{s}	+56° 00′ 43″	310	16.2
KKH 12	Irr	02^{h} 27^{m} 26.9^{s}	+57° 29′ 16″	70	17.8
Maffei 1	S0 pec	02^{h} 36^{m} 35.4^{s}	+59° 39′ 19″	13 ± 22	11.4
Maffei 2	SAB(rs)bc	02^{h} 41^{m} 55.1^{s}	+59° 36′ 15″	–17 ± 5	16.0
MB 1	SAB(s)d	02^{h} 35^{m} 36.5^{s}	+59° 22′ 43″	190 ± 1	20.5
MB 3	dSph	02^{h} 55^{m} 42.7^{s}	+58° 51′ 37″	59 ± 1	17.33

Additionally, KKH 37 is listed as possibly being a member of the IC 342 Subgroup, and KKH 6 is listed as possibly being a member of the Maffei 1 Subgroup.

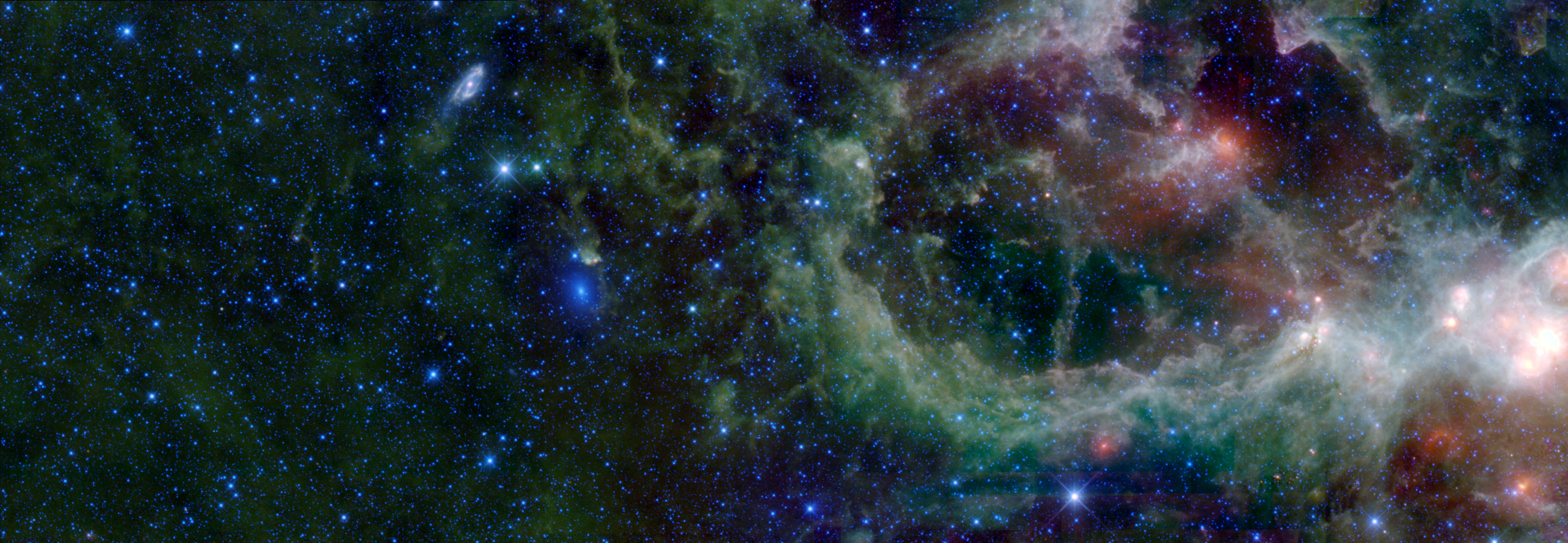
Maffei 1 and Maffei 2 are visible in this image.

== Foreground dust obscuration ==
As seen from Earth, the group lies near the plane of the Milky Way (a region sometimes called the Zone of Avoidance). Consequently, the light from many of the galaxies is severely affected by dust obscuration within the Milky Way. This complicates observational studies of the group, as uncertainties in the dust obscuration also affect measurements of the galaxies' luminosities and distances as well as other related quantities.

Moreover, the galaxies within the group have historically been difficult to identify. Many galaxies have only been discovered using late 20th century astronomical instrumentation. For example, Maffei 1 and Maffei 2 were only discovered in 1968 using infrared photographic images of the region. Furthermore, it is difficult to determine whether some objects near IC 342 or Maffei 1 are galaxies associated with the IC 342/Maffei Group or diffuse foreground objects within the Milky Way that merely look like galaxies. For example, the objects MB 2 and Camelopardalis C were once thought to be dwarf galaxies in the IC 342/Maffei Group but are now known to be objects within the Milky Way.

== Group formation and possible interactions with the Local Group ==
Since the IC 342/Maffei Group and the Local Group are located physically close to each other, the two groups may have influenced each other's evolution during the early stages of galaxy formation. An analysis of the velocities and distances to the IC 342/Maffei Group as measured by M. J. Valtonen and collaborators suggested that IC 342 and Maffei 1 were moving faster than what could be accounted for in the expansion of the universe. They therefore suggested that IC 342 and Maffei 1 were ejected from the Local Group after a violent gravitational interaction with the Andromeda Galaxy during the early stages of the formation of the two groups.

However, this interpretation is dependent on the distances measured to the galaxies in the group, which in turn is dependent on accurately measuring the degree to which interstellar dust in the Milky Way obscures the group. More recent observations have demonstrated that the dust obscuration may have been previously overestimated, so the distances may have been underestimated. If these new distance measurements are correct, then the galaxies in the IC 342/Maffei Group appear to be moving at the rate expected from the expansion of the universe, and the scenario of a collision between the IC 342/Maffei Group and the Local Group would be implausible.
