= Zone of Avoidance =

Area of sky obscured by the Milky Way

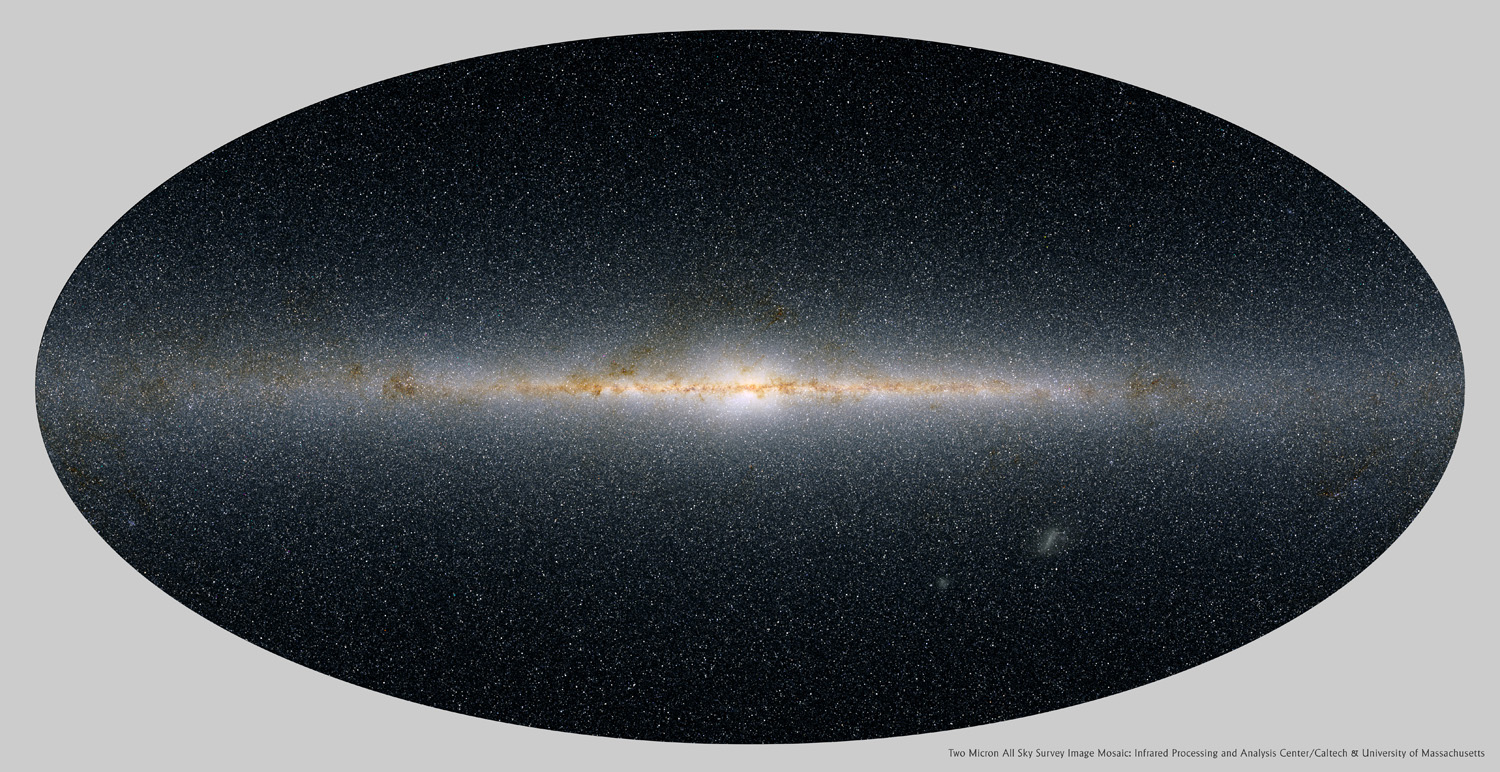
The Milky Way creates a Zone of Avoidance for local observers.

The Zone of Avoidance (ZOA, ZoA), or Zone of Galactic Obscuration (ZGO), is the area of the sky that is obscured by the Milky Way.

The Zone of Avoidance was originally called the Zone of Few Nebulae in an 1878 paper by English astronomer Richard Proctor that referred to the distribution of "nebulae" in John Herschel's General Catalogue of Nebulae.

== Background ==
When viewing space from Earth, the attenuation, interstellar dust and stars in the plane of the Milky Way (the galactic plane) obstruct the view of around 20% of the extragalactic sky at visible wavelengths. As a result, optical galaxy catalogues are usually incomplete close to the galactic plane.

== Modern developments ==
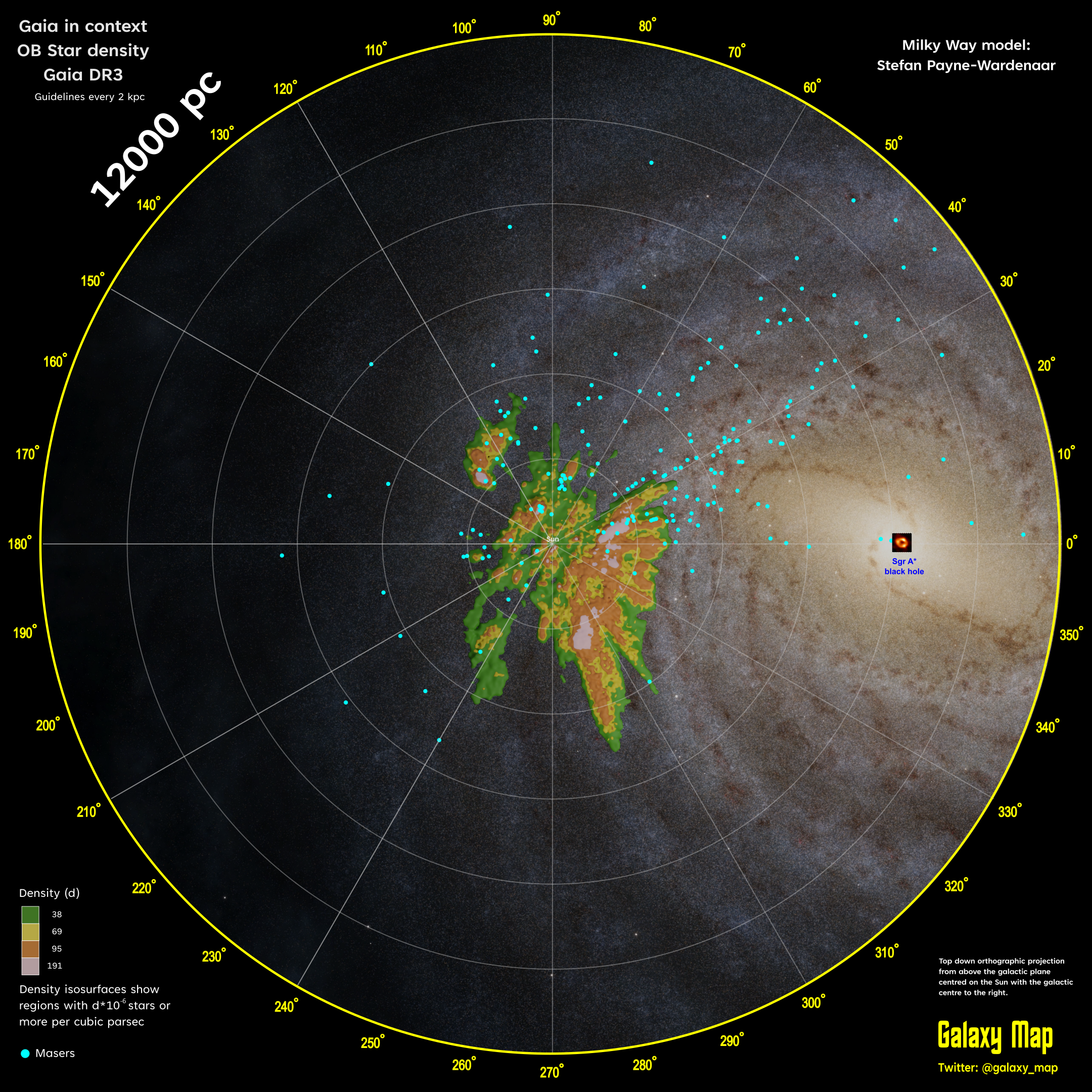
The limits of observation as visualized by the Milky Way's star density map. Source: Gaia spacecraft's 2021 data release

Many projects have attempted to bridge the gap in knowledge caused by the Zone of Avoidance. The dust and gas in the Milky Way cause extinction at optical wavelengths, and foreground stars can be confused with background galaxies. However, the effect of extinction drops at longer wavelengths, such as the infrared, and the Milky Way is effectively transparent at radio wavelengths. Surveys in the infrared, such as IRAS and 2MASS, have given a more complete picture of the extragalactic sky. Two very large nearby galaxies, Maffei 1 and Maffei 2, were discovered in the Zone of Avoidance by Paolo Maffei by their infrared emission in 1968. Even so, approximately 10% of the sky remains difficult to survey as extragalactic objects can be confused with stars in the Milky Way.

Projects to survey the Zone of Avoidance at radio wavelengths, particularly using the 21 cm spin-flip emission line of neutral atomic hydrogen (known in astronomical parlance as H I line), have detected many galaxies that could not be detected in the infrared. Examples of galaxies detected from their HI emission include Dwingeloo 1 and Dwingeloo 2, discovered in 1994 and 1996, respectively.

Recent astronomical studies revealed a supercluster of galaxies, termed the Vela Supercluster, in the Great Attractor's theorized location.

== See also ==
- Extragalactic background light
- Great Attractor

== Sources ==
- Kraan-Korteweg, Renée C.; Lahav, Ofer (May 24, 2000). "The Universe behind the Milky Way". The Astronomy and Astrophysics Review. 10 (3): 211–261. arXiv:astro-ph/0005501. Bibcode:2000A&ARv..10..211K. doi:10.1007/s001590000011. S2CID 14760994.
- Kraan-Korteweg, R. C.; Staveley-Smith, L.; Donley, J.; Henning, P. A. (November 5, 2003). "The Universe behind the Southern Milky Way". Maps of the Cosmos. ASP Conference Series. Vol. 216. International Astronomical Union. arXiv:astro-ph/0311129. Bibcode:2005IAUS..216..203K. doi:10.1017/S0074180900196640. ISBN 978-1-58381-202-0.
