= Paolo Maffei =

Italian astrophysicist and science writer (1926–2009)

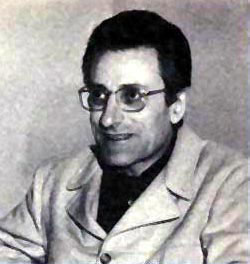
- Born: 2 January 1926; Arezzo, Italy
- Died: 1 March 2009 (aged 83)
- Occupations: Astrophysicist; Writer
- Known for: Infrared astronomy research

Paolo Maffei (2 January 1926 – 1 March 2009) was an Italian astrophysicist and science writer. Asteroid 18426 Maffei and the galaxies Maffei 1 and Maffei 2 are named for him.

== Life and Career ==
Paolo Maffei was born in Arezzo and was director of the Catania Observatory and an astronomer at Arcetri, Bologna, Asiago and Hamburg. He studied comets, variable stars, galaxies and the evolution of the universe. An internationally renowned astronomer, he was one of the pioneers of infrared astronomy research. In 1968 he discovered through infrared analysis two galaxies, otherwise unobservable because their light emission in the visible frequencies is absorbed by the dust that fills the plane of the Milky Way. The two galaxies were named after him: Maffei 1 (a galaxy that, if directly observable, would become one of the most visible objects in the sky) and Maffei 2. The two galaxies are the main constituents of the group known as "Maffei's Group of galaxies 1".

Maffei also a historian of astronomy and popularizer of astronomy through a series of books, including Al di là della Luna (1973) and I mostri del cielo (1976).

== Works ==
- Al di là della Luna (1973)
- I mostri del cielo (1976)
- L'universo nel tempo (1982)
- La cometa di Halley: dal passato al presente (1984)
- Giuseppe Settele, il suo diario e la questione galileiana (1987)
- Autobiographic paper: P.Maffei, "My Researches at the Infrared Doors", Memorie della Società Astronomica Italiana, Vol. 74 n. 1, 2003, pag. 19-28 (PDF),

(from "IV National Conference on Infrared Astronomy, in honour of Paolo Maffei", Perugia, December 4–7, 2001).
