= Palazzo Maffei =

Palazzo Maffei may refer to the following palaces in Italy:

- Palazzo Maffei, Verona
- Palazzo Maffei Marescotti, Rome
- Palazzo Maffei, Modugno
