= Dwingeloo 2 =

Irregular galaxy

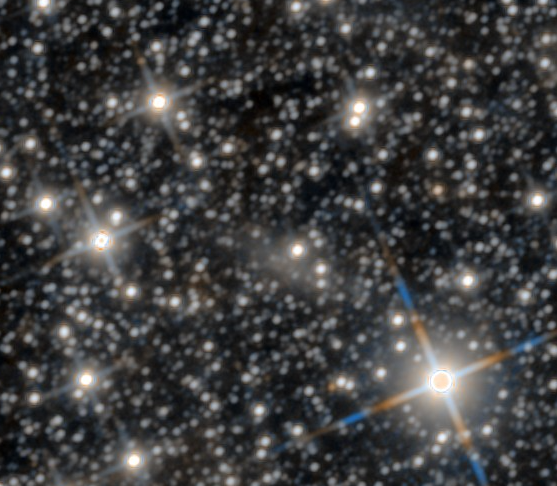
- Dwingeloo 2 imaged in 2025

Observation data (J2000 epoch)
- Constellation: Cassiopeia
- Right ascension: 02^{h} 54^{m} 08.47^{s}
- Declination: +59° 00′ 19.1″
- Heliocentric radial velocity: 94 ± 1.5 km/s
- Galactocentric velocity: 241 km/s
- Distance: ~10 Mly (3 Mpc)
- Group or cluster: IC 342/Maffei
- Apparent magnitude (V): 16.21 (V-band)

Characteristics
- Type: IAm
- Apparent size (V): 2' × 0'.8
- Notable features: Companion of Dwingeloo 1

Other designations
- PGC 101304

Dwingeloo 2 is a small irregular galaxy discovered in 1996 and located about 10 million light-years away from the Earth. Its discovery was a result of the Dwingeloo Obscured Galaxy Survey (DOGS) of the Zone of Avoidance using the Dwingeloo Radio Observatory. Dwingeloo 2 is a companion galaxy of Dwingeloo 1.

Dwingeloo 2 was first detected at radio wavelengths from the 21 cm emission line of neutral atomic hydrogen (known to astronomers as HI) in the course of follow-up observations after the discovery of Dwingeloo 1. Dwingeloo 2 is thought to be a member of the IC 342/Maffei Group, a galaxy group adjacent to the Local Group. The galaxy recedes from the Milky Way at the speed of about 241 km/s.

The visible radius of Dwingeloo 2 is approximately 2′, which at the distance of 3 Mpc corresponds to about 2 kpc. Dwingeloo 2 has a well defined rotating HI disk inclined at approximately 69° with respect to observer. The distribution of the neutral hydrogen in Dwingeloo 2 is quite irregular, and it is detected as far as 3.2 kpc from the center of the galaxy. The total mass of the galaxy within this radius is estimated at 2.3 billion Solar masses, while the mass of the neutral hydrogen is estimated at 100 million Solar masses. The total mass of the galaxy is about five times less than that of Dwingeloo 1.

The irregular structure of Dwingeloo 2 is likely related to its interaction with the much larger nearby galaxy Dwingeloo 1, which lies at a distance of only 24 kpc from Dwingeloo 2.
