= Dwingeloo 1 =

Heavily obscured barred spiral galaxy in the constellation Cassiopeia

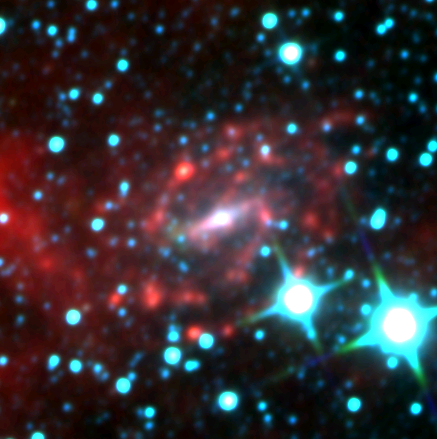
- WISE infrared image of Dwingeloo 1

Observation data (J2000 epoch)
- Constellation: Cassiopeia
- Right ascension: 02^{h} 56^{m} 51.9^{s}
- Declination: +58° 54′ 42″
- Redshift: 0.000368
- Heliocentric radial velocity: 110.3 ± 0.4 km/s
- Galactocentric velocity: 257 km/s
- Distance: ~ 10 Mly (~3 Mpc)
- Group or cluster: IC 342/Maffei
- Apparent magnitude (V): 13.08 (V-band)

Characteristics
- Type: SB(s)cd
- Apparent size (V): 4.2′ × 0.34′

Other designations
- LEDA 100170, PGC 100170, CAS 2

Dwingeloo 1 is a barred spiral galaxy about 10 million light-years away from the Earth, in the constellation Cassiopeia. It lies in the Zone of Avoidance and is heavily obscured by the Milky Way. The size and mass of Dwingeloo 1 are comparable to those of Triangulum Galaxy.

Dwingeloo 1 has two smaller satellite galaxies – Dwingeloo 2 and MB 3 – and is a member of the IC 342/Maffei Group of galaxies.

== Discovery ==
The Dwingeloo 1 galaxy was discovered in 1994 by the Dwingeloo Obscured Galaxy Survey (DOGS) using the Dwingeloo Radio Observatory, which searched for neutral hydrogen (HI) radio emissions at the wavelength of 21 cm from objects in the Zone of Avoidance. In this zone gas and dust in the disk of the Milky Way galaxy block the light from the galaxies lying behind it.

The galaxy was, however, first noted as an unremarkable feature on Palomar Sky Survey plates earlier in the same year, but was not recognized as such. It was also independently discovered a few weeks later by another team of astronomers working with Effelsberg 100-m Radio Telescope.

Dwingeloo 1 was eventually named after the 25m radio telescope in the Netherlands that was used in the DOGS survey and first detected it.

== Distance and group membership ==
Dwingeloo 1 is a highly obscured galaxy, which makes distance determination a difficult problem. The initial estimate, made soon after the discovery and based on the Tully–Fisher relation, was about 3 Mpc. Later, this value was slightly increased to 3.5–4 Mpc.

In 1999 another estimate was published, claiming a distance of more than 5 Mpc. It was based on the infrared Tully–Fisher relation. As of 2011, the distance to Dwingeloo 1 is thought to be approximately 3 Mpc, based on its likely membership in the IC 342/Maffei group.

Dwingeloo 1 has two smaller satellite galaxies. The first one, Dwingeloo 2, is an irregular galaxy, and the second, MB 3, is likely a dwarf spheroidal galaxy.

== Properties ==
After the discovery Dwingeloo 1 was classified as a barred spiral galaxy. It has a central bar and two distinct spiral arms that begin at the ends of the bar at nearly right angles and wind counterclockwise. The length of the arms is up to 180°. The disk of the galaxy is inclined with respect to the observer, with the inclination angle being 50°. The galaxy recedes from the Milky Way at a speed of about 256 km/s.

The visible radius of Dwingeloo 1 is approximately 4.2', which at the distance of 3 Mpc corresponds to about 4 kpc. The neutral hydrogen is detected as far as 6 kpc (7.5') from the center. The total mass of the galaxy is about 1/4 that of the Milky Way out to the measured distance of 6 kpc or about 31 billion Solar masses.

The distribution of the neutral hydrogen in Dwingeloo 1 is typical for barred spiral galaxies—it is rather flat with a minimum in the center or along the bar. The total mass of the neutral hydrogen is estimated at 370–450 million Solar masses. Dwingeloo 1 is a molecular gas-poor galaxy. The total mass of the molecular hydrogen does not exceed 10% of that of neutral hydrogen. Optical observations detected around 15 H II regions situated mainly along the spiral arms.

In its overall size and mass, the galaxy is comparable to Triangulum Galaxy.

== See also ==
- Dwingeloo 2
- Maffei 1
- Maffei 2
- IC 342
