= Maffei 2 =

Galaxy in the constellation Cassiopeia

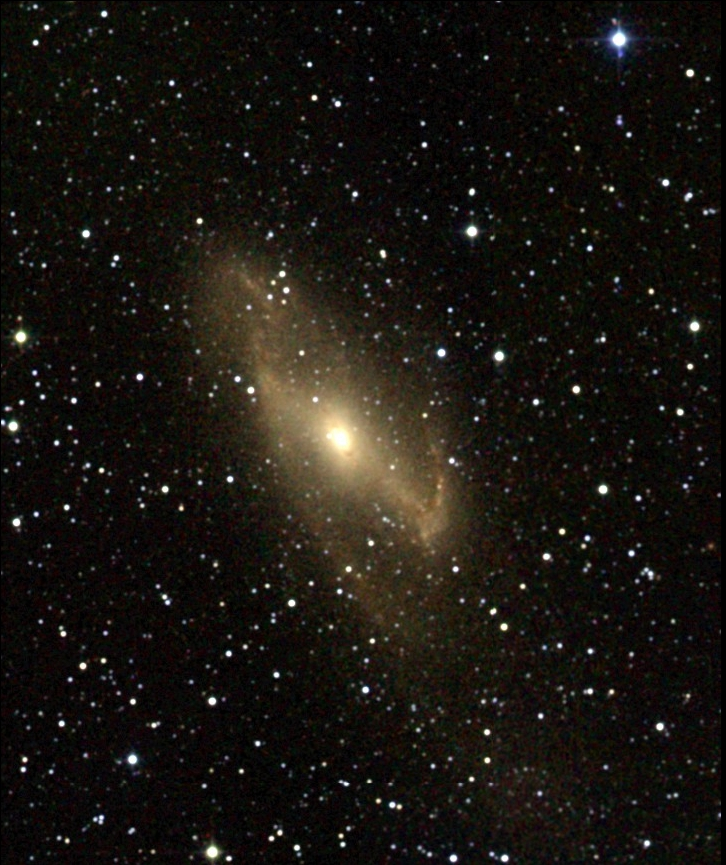
- Image by Two Micron All Sky Survey (2MASS)

Observation data (J2000 epoch)
- Constellation: Cassiopeia
- Right ascension: 02^{h} 41^{m} 55.1^{s}
- Declination: +59° 36′ 15″
- Redshift: -17 ± 5 km/s
- Distance: 9.8 Mly
- Apparent magnitude (V): 16.0

Characteristics
- Type: SAB(rs)bc
- Size: 16.57 Kiloparsecs (54,000 Light-Years) (diameter; 25.0 mag/arcsec^{2} B-band isophote)
- Apparent size (V): 15.2′ × 7.0′

Other designations
- UGCA 39, PGC 10217, Sharpless 197

Maffei 2 is an intermediate spiral galaxy about 10 million light-years away in the constellation Cassiopeia. Maffei 2 and Maffei 1 were both discovered by Paolo Maffei in 1968 from their infrared emission. Maffei 2 lies in the Zone of Avoidance and is about 99.5% obscured by the Milky Way's foreground dust clouds, and as a result is barely detectable at optical wavelengths. It had been suggested soon after its discovery that Maffei 2 may be a member of the Local Group, but it is now thought to be a member of another nearby group, the IC 342/Maffei Group, the galaxy group that is the closest to the Local Group.

== See also ==
- Dwingeloo 1
- NGC 1300
