= IC 342 =

Spiral galaxy in the constellation Camelopardalis

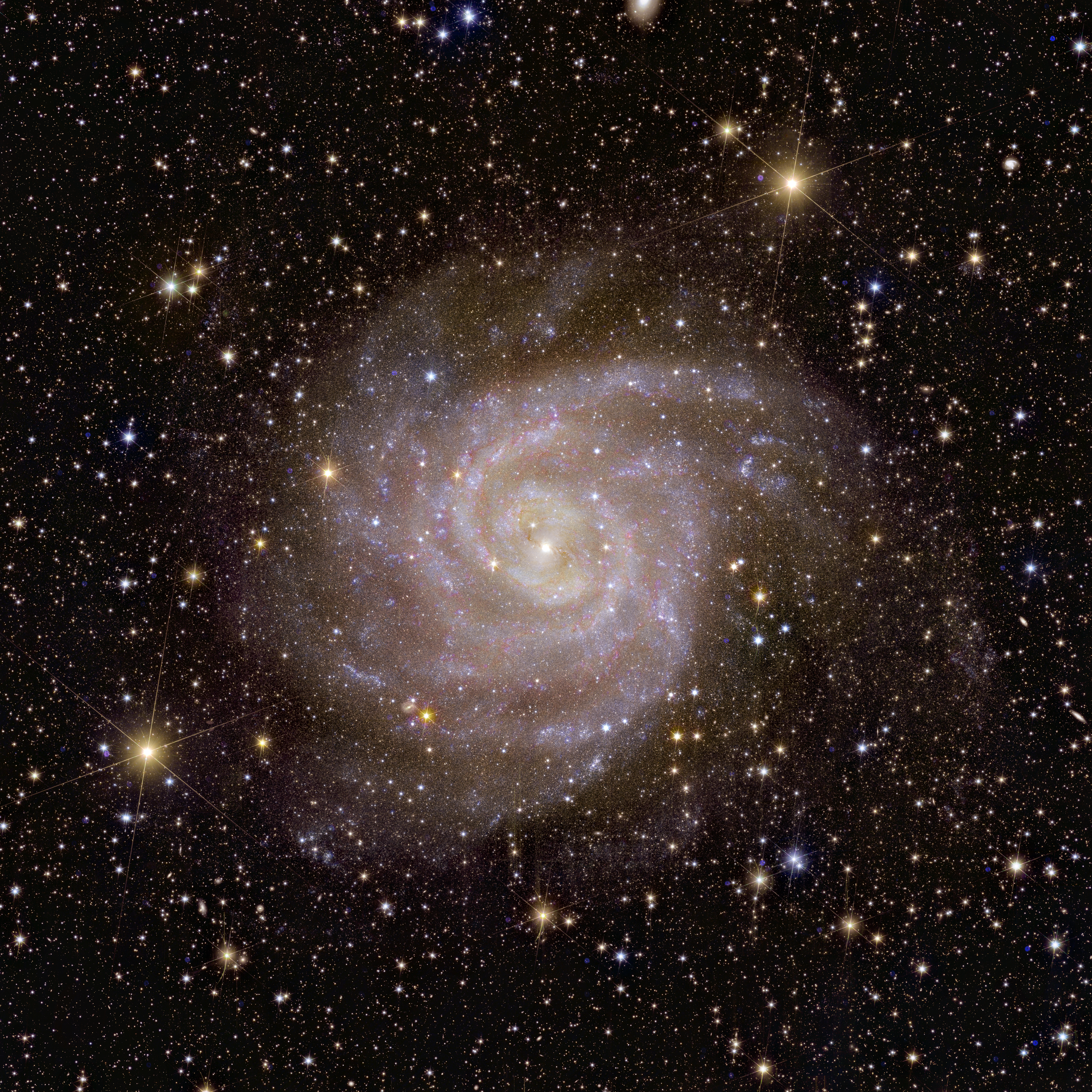
- Euclid telescope image of the IC 342 galaxy

Observation data (J2000 epoch)
- Constellation: Camelopardalis
- Right ascension: 03^{h} 46^{m} 48.5028^{s}
- Declination: +68° 05′ 46.924″
- Redshift: 31 ± 3 km/s
- Distance: 10.7 ± 0.9 Mly (3.3 ± 0.3 Mpc)
- Apparent magnitude (V): 9.1

Characteristics
- Type: SAB(rs)cd
- Number of stars: 100 billion
- Size: ~150,000 ly (45.62 kpc) (estimated)
- Apparent size (V): 21.4′ × 20.9′

Other designations
- IRAS 03419+6756, UGC 2847, MCG +11-05-003, PGC 13826, CGCG 305-002, C 5

IC 342 (also known as Caldwell 5) is an intermediate spiral galaxy in the constellation Camelopardalis, located relatively close to the Milky Way. Despite its size and actual brightness, its location behind dusty areas near the galactic equator makes it difficult to observe, leading to the nickname "The Hidden Galaxy", though it can readily be detected even with binoculars. If the galaxy were not obscured, it would be visible by naked eye. The dust makes it difficult to determine its precise distance; modern estimates range from about 7 million light-years (Mly) to about 11 Mly.

The galaxy was discovered by William Frederick Denning in 1892. It is one of the brightest in the IC 342/Maffei Group, one of the closest galaxy groups to the Local Group. Edwin Hubble first thought it to be in the Local Group, but it was later determined not to be a member.

In 1935, Harlow Shapley found that it was wider than the full moon, and by angular size the third-largest spiral galaxy then known, smaller only than the Andromeda Galaxy (M31) and the Triangulum Galaxy (M33). (Modern estimates are more conservative, giving the apparent size as one-half to two-thirds the diameter of the full moon).

It has an H II nucleus. In 2020, the galaxy KKH 32 was identified as the first known satellite of IC 342 that is a dwarf spheroidal galaxy. Unlike galaxies with large bulges such as the Andromeda Galaxy, IC 342 has relatively few dwarf satellite galaxies. KKH 32 is located about 10.2 million light-years (3.12 megaparsecs) away, and has a diameter of about 4,300 light-years (1.32 kiloparsecs). IC 342 is considered as a Late-Type Spiral galaxy.

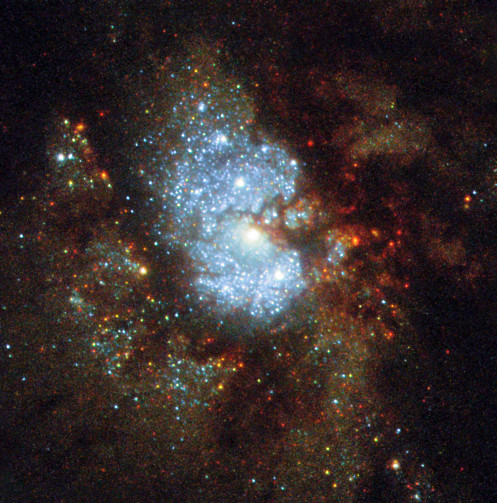
Hubble Space Telescope image of the central region of IC 342, showing the central star cluster and surrounding dust lanes.

== See also ==
- NGC 6946 – similar galaxy heavily obscured by Milky Way stars and dust.
