= Timeline of knowledge about galaxies, clusters of galaxies, and large-scale structure =

The following is a timeline of human knowledge concerning galaxies, clusters of galaxies, and the large-scale structure of the universe.

== Pre-20th century ==
- 5th century BC – Democritus proposes that the bright band in the night sky known as the Milky Way might consist of stars.
- 4th century BC – Aristotle believes the Milky Way to be caused by "the ignition of the fiery exhalation of some stars which were large, numerous and close together" and that the "ignition takes place in the upper part of the atmosphere, in the region of the world which is continuous with the heavenly motions".
- 964 – Abd al-Rahman al-Sufi (Azophi), a Persian astronomer, makes the first recorded observations of the Andromeda Galaxy and the Large Magellanic Cloud in his Book of Fixed Stars, and which are the first galaxies other than the Milky Way to be recorded.
- 11th century – Al-Biruni, another Persian astronomer, describes the Milky Way galaxy as a collection of fragments of numerous nebulous stars.
- 11th century – Alhazen (Ibn al-Haytham), an Arabian astronomer, refutes Aristotle's theory on the Milky Way by making the first attempt at observing and measuring the Milky Way's parallax, and he thus "determined that because the Milky Way had no parallax, it was very remote from the Earth and did not belong to the atmosphere".
- 12th century – Avempace (Ibn Bajjah) of Islamic Spain proposes the Milky Way to be made up of many stars but that it appears to be a continuous image due to the effect of refraction in the Earth's atmosphere.
- 14th century – Ibn Qayyim al-Jawziyya of Syria proposes the Milky Way galaxy to be "a myriad of tiny stars packed together in the sphere of the fixed stars", and that these stars are larger than planets.
- 1521 – Ferdinand Magellan observes the Magellanic Clouds during his circumnavigating expedition.
- 1610 – Galileo Galilei uses a telescope to determine that the bright band on the sky, the "Milky Way", is composed of many faint stars.
- 1612 – Simon Marius using a moderate telescope observes Andromeda and describes as a "flame seen through horn".
- 1750 – Thomas Wright discusses galaxies and the flattened shape of the Milky Way and speculates nebulae as separate.
- 1755 – Immanuel Kant drawing on Wright's work conjectures that our galaxy is a rotating disk of stars held together by gravity, and that the nebulae are separate such galaxies; he calls them Island Universes.
- 1774 – Charles Messier releases a preliminary list of 45 Messier objects, including Andromeda and Triangulum. By 1781 the final published list grows to 103 objects, 34 of which turn out to be galaxies.
- 1785 – William Herschel carries out the first attempt to describe the shape of the Milky Way and the position of the Sun in it by carefully counting the number of stars in different regions of the sky. He produced a diagram of the shape of the galaxy with the Solar System close to the center.
- 1845 – Lord Rosse discovers a nebula with a distinct spiral shape.

== Early 20th century ==
- 1912 – Henrietta Swan Leavitt publishes her study of cepheid variable stars in the Small Magellanic Cloud and the period-luminosity curve. The Leavitt law allows astronomers to accurately measure galactic distances.
- 1912 – Vesto Slipher's spectrographic studies of spiral nebulae find high Doppler shifts indicating recessional velocity.
- 1917 – Heber Curtis finds that the novae in Andromeda Nebula M31 were ten magnitudes fainter than normal, giving a distance estimate of 150,000 parsecs supporting the "island universes" independent galaxies hypothesis for spiral nebulae.
- 1918 – Harlow Shapley demonstrates that globular clusters are arranged in a spheroid or halo whose center is not the Earth, and hypothesizes, correctly, that its center is the center of the galaxy.
- 26 April 1920 – Harlow Shapley and Heber Curtis debate whether Andromeda Nebula is within the Milky Way. Curtis notes dark lanes in Andromeda resembling the dust clouds in the Milky Way, as well as significant Doppler shift.
- 1922 – Ernst Öpik distance determination supports Andromeda as extra-galactic object.
- 1923 – Edwin Hubble resolves the Shapley–Curtis debate by finding Cepheids in the Andromeda Galaxy, definitively proving that there are other galaxies beyond the Milky Way.
- 1930 – Robert Trumpler uses open cluster observations to quantify the absorption of light by interstellar dust in the galactic plane; this absorption had plagued earlier models of the Milky Way.
- 1932 – Karl Guthe Jansky discovers radio noise from the center of the Milky Way.
- 1933 – Fritz Zwicky applies the virial theorem to the Coma Cluster and obtains evidence for unseen mass.
- 1936 – Edwin Hubble introduces the spiral, barred spiral, elliptical, and irregular galaxy classifications.
- 1939 – Grote Reber discovers the radio source Cygnus A.
- 1943 – Carl Keenan Seyfert identifies six spiral galaxies with unusually broad emission lines, named Seyfert galaxies.
- 1949 – J. G. Bolton, G. J. Stanley, and O. B. Slee identify NGC 4486 (M87) and NGC 5128 as extragalactic radio sources.

== Mid-20th century ==
- 1953 – Gérard de Vaucouleurs discovers that the galaxies within approximately 200 million light-years of the Virgo Cluster are confined to a giant supercluster disk.
- 1954 – Walter Baade and Rudolph Minkowski identify the extragalactic optical counterpart of the radio source Cygnus A.
- 1959 – Hundreds of radio sources are detected by the Cambridge Interferometer which produces the 3C catalogue. Many of these are later found to be distant quasars and radio galaxies.
- 1960 – Thomas Matthews determines the radio position of the 3C source 3C 48 to within 5".
- 1960 – Allan Sandage optically studies 3C 48 and observes an unusual blue quasistellar object.
- 1962 – Cyril Hazard, M. B. Mackey, and A. J. Shimmins use lunar occultations to determine a precise position for the quasar 3C 273 and deduce that it is a double source.
- 1962 – Olin Eggen, Donald Lynden-Bell, and Allan Sandage theorize galaxy formation by a single (relatively) rapid monolithic collapse, with the halo forming first, followed by the disk.
- 1963 – Maarten Schmidt identifies the redshifted Balmer lines from the quasar 3C 273.
- 1973 – Jeremiah Ostriker and James Peebles discover that the amount of visible matter in the disks of typical spiral galaxies is not enough for Newtonian gravitation to keep the disks from flying apart or drastically changing shape.
- 1973 – Donald Gudehus finds that the diameters of the brightest cluster galaxies have increased due to merging, the diameters of the faintest cluster galaxies have decreased due to tidal distention, and that the Virgo cluster has a substantial peculiar velocity.
- 1974 – B. L. Fanaroff and J. M. Riley distinguish between edge-darkened (FR I) and edge-brightened (FR II) radio sources.
- 1976 – Sandra Faber and Robert Jackson discover the Faber-Jackson relation between the luminosity of an elliptical galaxy and the velocity dispersion in its center. In 1991 the relation is revised by Donald Gudehus.
- 1977 – R. Brent Tully and Richard Fisher publish the Tully–Fisher relation between the luminosity of an isolated spiral galaxy and the velocity of the flat part of its rotation curve.
- 1978 – Steve Gregory and Laird Thompson describe the Coma supercluster.
- 1978 – Vera Rubin, Kent Ford, N. Thonnard, and Albert Bosma measure the rotation curves of several spiral galaxies and find significant deviations from what is predicted by the Newtonian gravitation of visible stars.
- 1978 – Leonard Searle and Robert Zinn theorize that galaxy formation occurs through the merger of smaller groups.

== Late 20th century ==
- 1981 – Robert Kirshner, August Oemler, Paul Schechter, and Stephen Shectman find evidence for a giant void in Boötes, 250 to 330 million light years across.
- 1985 – Robert Antonucci and J. Miller discover that the Seyfert II galaxy NGC 1068 has broad lines which can only be seen in polarized reflected light.
- 1986 – Amos Yahil, David Walker, and Michael Rowan-Robinson find that the direction of the IRAS galaxy density dipole agrees with the direction of the cosmic microwave background temperature dipole.
- 1987 – David Burstein, Roger Davies, Alan Dressler, Sandra Faber, Donald Lynden-Bell, R. J. Terlevich, and Gary Wegner claim that a large group of galaxies within about 200 million light years of the Milky Way are moving together towards the "Great Attractor" in the direction of Hydra and Centaurus.
- 1987 – R. Brent Tully discovers the Pisces–Cetus Supercluster Complex, a structure one billion light years long and 150 million light years wide.
- 1989 – Margaret Geller and John Huchra discover the "Great Wall", a sheet of galaxies more than 500 million light years long and 200 million wide, but only 15 million light years thick.
- 1990 – Michael Rowan-Robinson and Tom Broadhurst discover that the IRAS galaxy IRAS F10214+4724 is the brightest known object in the Universe.
- 1992 – First detection of large-scale structure in the cosmic microwave background indicating the seeds of the first clusters of galaxies in the early Universe.
- 1995 – First detection of small-scale structure in the cosmic microwave background.
- 1995 – Hubble Deep Field survey of galaxies in field 144 arc seconds across.
- 1998 – The 2dF Galaxy Redshift Survey maps the large-scale structure in a section of the Universe close to the Milky Way.
- 1998 – The Hubble Deep Field South is compiled.
- 1998 – Discovery of accelerating universe.
- 2000 – Data from several cosmic microwave background experiments give strong evidence that the Universe is "flat" (space is not curved, although space-time is), with important implications for the formation of large-scale structure.

== Early 21st century ==
- 2001 – First data release from the ongoing Sloan Digital Sky Survey
- 2004 – The European Southern Observatory discovers Abell 1835 IR1916, the most distant galaxy yet seen from Earth.
- 2004 – The Arcminute Microkelvin Imager begins to map the distribution of distant clusters of galaxies
- 2005 – Spitzer Space Telescope data confirm what had been considered likely since the early 1990s from radio telescope data, i.e., that the Milky Way Galaxy is a barred spiral galaxy.
- 2012 – Astronomers report the discovery of the most distant dwarf galaxy yet found, approximately 10 billion light-years away.
- 2012 – The Huge-LQG, a large quasar group, one of the largest known structures in the universe, is discovered.
- 2013 – The galaxy Z8 GND 5296 is confirmed by spectroscopy to be one of the most distant galaxies found up to this time. Formed just 700 million years after the Big Bang, expansion of the universe has carried it to its current location, about 13 billion light years away from Earth (30 billion light years comoving distance).
- 2013 – The Hercules–Corona Borealis Great Wall, a massive galaxy filament and the largest known structure in the universe, was discovered through gamma-ray burst mapping.
- 2014 – The Laniakea Supercluster, the galaxy supercluster that is home to the Milky Way is defined via a new way of defining superclusters according to the relative velocities of galaxies. The new definition of the local supercluster subsumes the prior defined local supercluster, the Virgo Supercluster, as an appendage.
- 2020 – Astronomers report the discovery of a large cavity in the Ophiuchus Supercluster, first detected in 2016 and originating from a supermassive black hole with the mass of 10 million solar masses. The cavity is a result of the largest known explosion in the Universe. The formerly active galactic nucleus created it by emitting radiation and particle jets, possibly as a result of a spike in supply of gas to the black hole that could have occurred if a galaxy fell into the centre of the cavity.
- 2020 – Astronomers report to have discovered the disk galaxy Wolfe Disk, dating back to when the universe was only 1.5 billion years old, possibly indicating the need to revise theories of galaxy formation and evolution.
- 2020 – The South Pole Wall is a massive cosmic structure formed by a giant wall of galaxies (a galaxy filament) that extends across at least 1.37 billion light-years of space, and is located approximately a half billion light-years away.
- 2020 – After a 20-year-long survey, astrophysicists of the Sloan Digital Sky Survey publish the largest, most detailed 3D map of the universe so far, fill a gap of 11 billion years in its expansion history, and provide data which supports the theory of a flat geometry of the universe and confirms that different regions seem to be expanding at different speeds.
- 2022 – James Webb Space Telescope (JWST) releases the Webb's First Deep Field.
- 2022 – JWST detects CEERS-93316, a candidate high-redshift galaxy, with an estimated redshift of approximately z = 16.7, corresponding to 235.8 million years after the Big Bang. If confirmed, it is one of the earliest and most distant known galaxies observed.

== See also ==
- Illustris project
- Large-scale structure of the cosmos
- Timeline of astronomical maps, catalogs, and surveys
- Timeline of cosmological theories
- UniverseMachine
- List of largest cosmic structures
- List of the most distant astronomical objects#Timeline of most distant astronomical object recordholders
