= Galaxy groups and clusters =

Largest known gravitationally bound object in universe; aggregation of galaxies

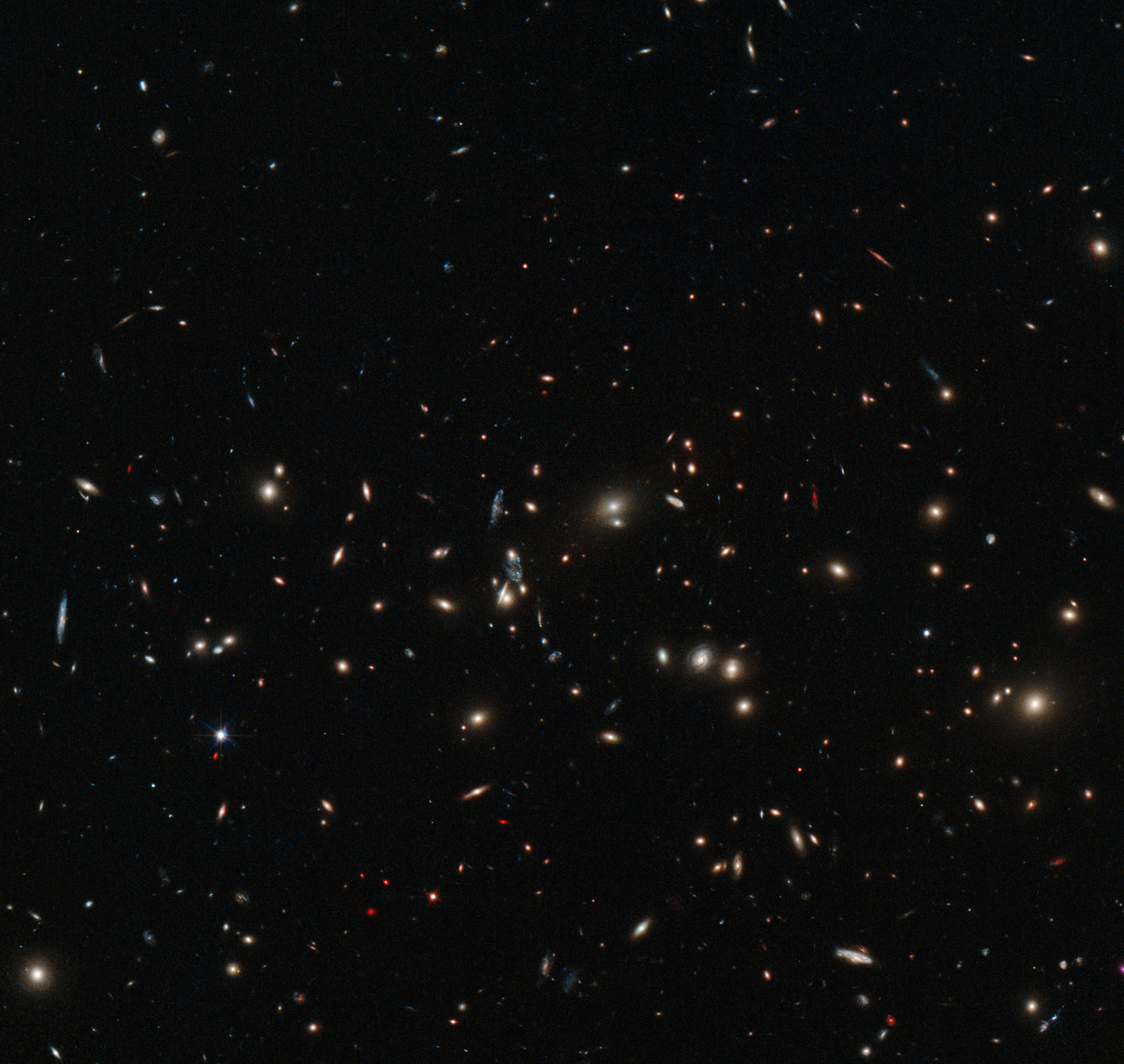
MACS J0152.5-2852 is a massive galaxy cluster. Almost every object seen in the image is a galaxy, each containing billions of stars.

Galaxy groups and clusters are the largest known gravitationally bound objects to have arisen thus far in the process of cosmic structure formation. They form the densest part of the large-scale structure of the universe. In models for the gravitational formation of structure with cold dark matter, the smallest structures collapse first and eventually build the largest structures, clusters of galaxies. Clusters are then formed relatively recently between 10 billion years ago and now. Groups and clusters may contain ten to thousands of individual galaxies. The clusters themselves are often associated with larger, non-gravitationally bound, groups called superclusters.

== Groups of galaxies ==
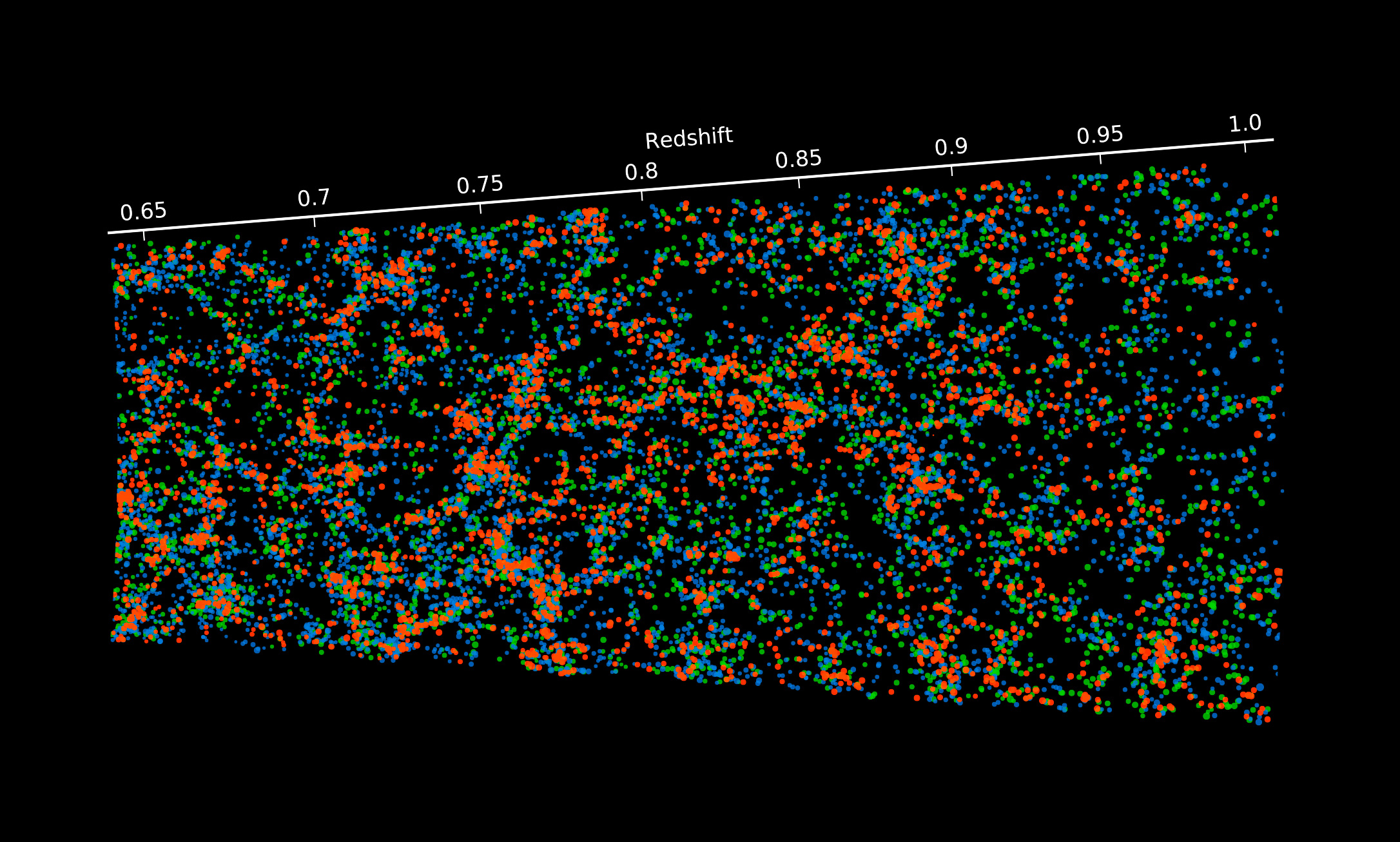
Map of the positions of thousands of galaxies in the VIPERS survey

Groups of galaxies are the smallest aggregates of galaxies. They typically contain no more than 50 galaxies in a diameter of 1 to 2 megaparsecs (Mpc)(see 10^{22} m for distance comparisons). Their mass is approximately 10^{13} solar masses. The spread of velocities for the individual galaxies is about 150 km/s. However, this definition should be used as a guide only, as larger and more massive galaxy systems are sometimes classified as galaxy groups. Groups are the most common structures of galaxies in the universe, comprising at least 50% of the galaxies in the local universe. Groups have a mass range between those of the very large elliptical galaxies and clusters of galaxies.

Our own galaxy, the Milky Way, is contained in the Local Group of more than 54 galaxies.

In July 2017 S. Paul, R. S. John et al. defined clear distinguishing parameters for classifying galaxy aggregations as 'galaxy groups' and 'clusters' on the basis of scaling laws that they followed. According to this paper, galaxy aggregations less massive than 8 × 10^{13} solar masses are classified as galaxy groups.

== Clusters of galaxies ==
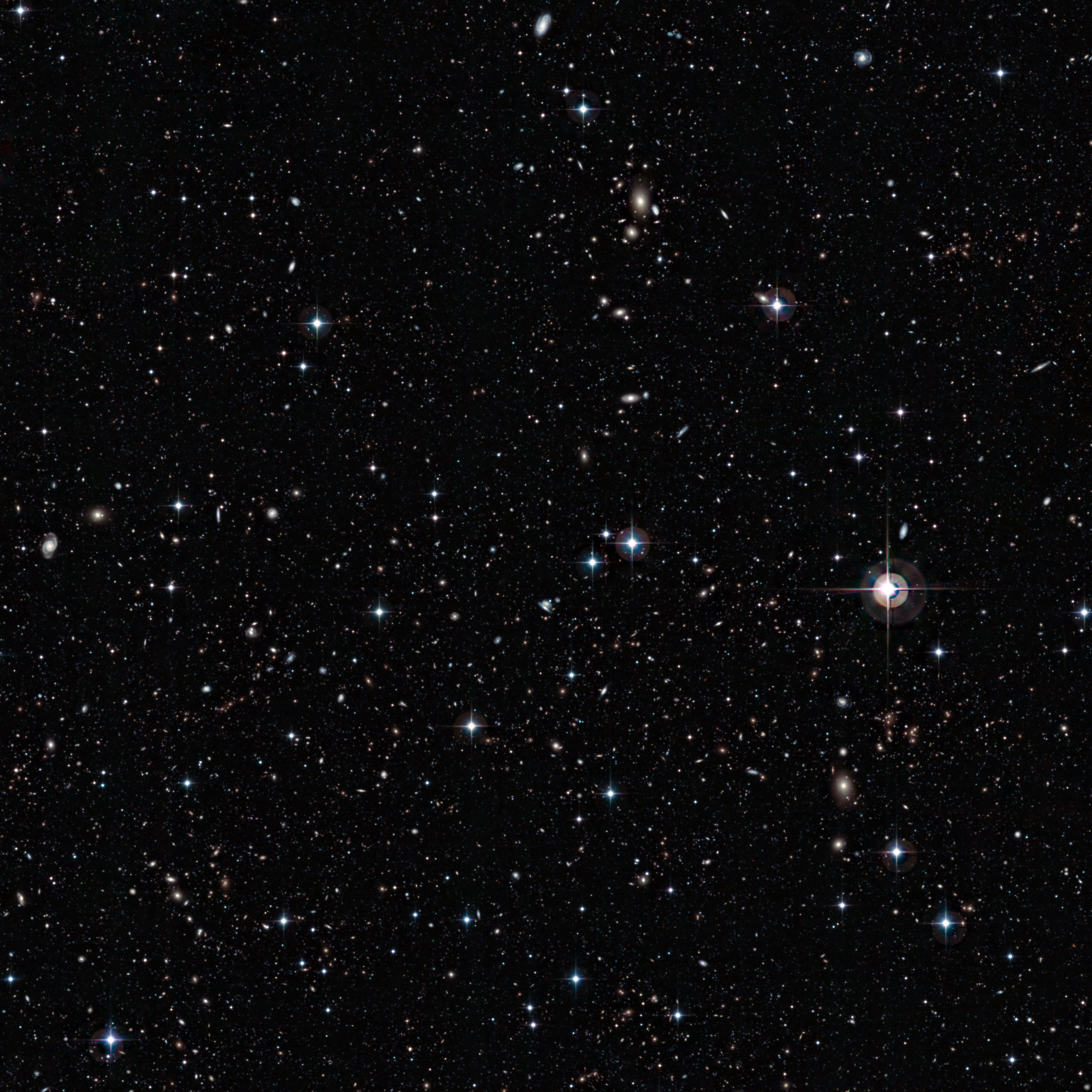
Rich scattering of galaxies was captured by the MPG/ESO telescope.

Clusters are larger than groups, although there is no sharp dividing line between the two. When observed visually, clusters appear to be collections of galaxies held together by mutual gravitational attraction. However, their velocities are too large for them to remain gravitationally bound by their mutual attractions, implying the presence of either an additional invisible mass component, or an additional attractive force besides gravity. X-ray studies have revealed the presence of large amounts of intergalactic gas known as the intracluster medium. This gas is very hot, between 10^{7}K and 10^{8}K, and hence emits X-rays in the form of bremsstrahlung and atomic line emission.

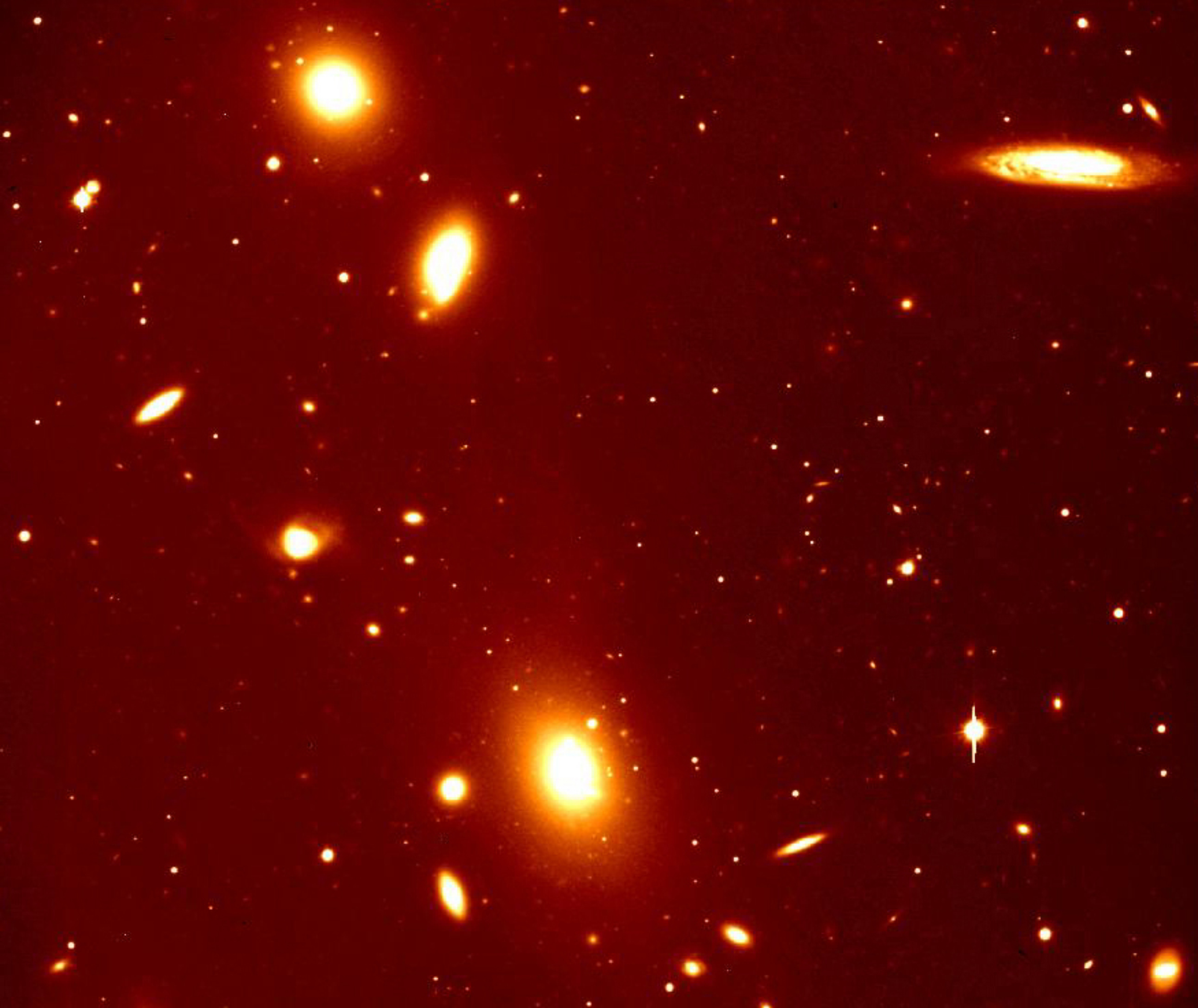
Galaxy cluster ACO 3341 seen by VLT's VIMOS

The total mass of the gas is greater than that of the galaxies by roughly a factor of two. However, this is still not enough mass to keep the galaxies in the cluster. Since this gas is in approximate hydrostatic equilibrium with the overall cluster gravitational field, the total mass distribution can be determined. It turns out the total mass deduced from this measurement is approximately six times larger than the mass of the galaxies or the hot gas. The missing component is known as dark matter and its nature is unknown. In a typical cluster perhaps only 5% of the total mass is in the form of galaxies, maybe 10% in the form of hot X-ray emitting gas and the remainder is dark matter. Brownstein and Moffat use a theory of modified gravity to explain X-ray cluster masses without dark matter. Observations of the Bullet Cluster are the strongest evidence for the existence of dark matter; however, Brownstein and Moffat have shown that their modified gravity theory can also account for the properties of the cluster.

=== Observational methods ===
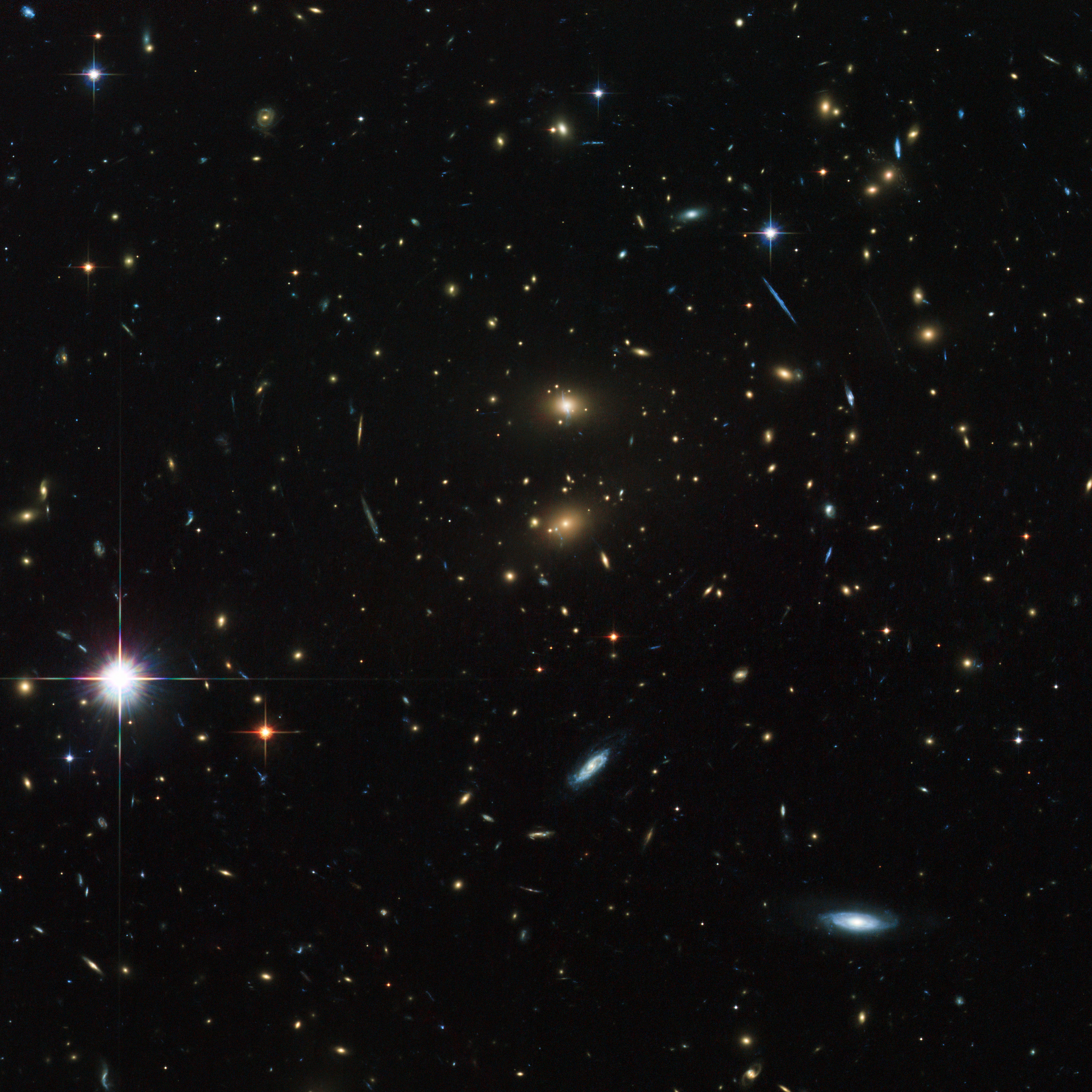
Galaxy Cluster LCDCS-0829 acting like a giant magnifying glass. This strange effect is called gravitational lensing.

Clusters of galaxies have been found in surveys by a number of observational techniques and have been studied in detail using many methods:

- Optical or infrared: The individual galaxies of clusters can be studied through optical or infrared imaging and spectroscopy. Galaxy clusters are found by optical or infrared telescopes by searching for overdensities, and then confirmed by finding several galaxies at a similar redshift. Infrared searches are more useful for finding more distant (higher redshift) clusters.
- X-ray: The hot plasma emits X-rays that can be detected by X-ray telescopes. The cluster gas can be studied using both X-ray imaging and X-ray spectroscopy. Clusters are quite prominent in X-ray surveys and along with AGN are the brightest X-ray emitting extragalactic objects.
- Radio: A number of diffuse structures emitting at radio frequencies have been found in clusters. Groups of radio sources (that may include diffuse structures or AGN) have been used as tracers of cluster location. At high redshift imaging around individual radio sources (in this case AGN) has been used to detect protoclusters (clusters in the process of forming).
- Sunyaev-Zel'dovich effect: The hot electrons in the intracluster medium scatter radiation from the cosmic microwave background through inverse Compton scattering. This produces a "shadow" in the observed cosmic microwave background at some radio frequencies.
- Gravitational lensing: Clusters of galaxies contain enough matter to distort the observed orientations of galaxies behind them. The observed distortions can be used to model the distribution of dark matter in the cluster.

=== Temperature and density ===
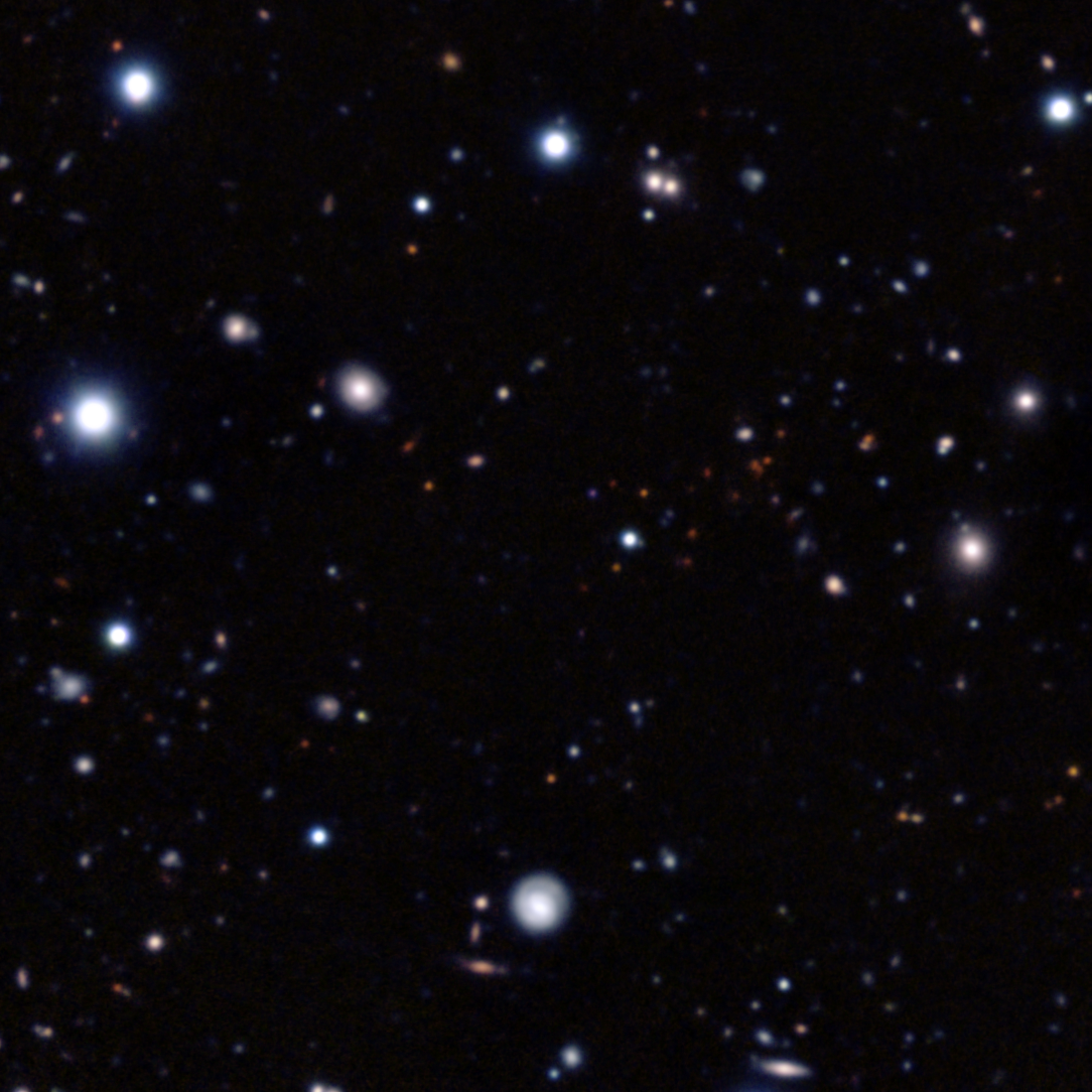
The Most Distant Mature Galaxy Cluster taken with ESO's Very Large Telescope in Chile and with NAOJ's Subaru Telescope in Hawaii

Clusters of galaxies are the most recent and most massive objects to have arisen in the hierarchical structure formation of the Universe and the study of clusters tells one about the way galaxies form and evolve. Clusters have two important properties: their masses are large enough to retain any energetic gas ejected from member galaxies and the thermal energy of the gas within the cluster is observable within the X-Ray bandpass. The observed state of gas within a cluster is determined by a combination of shock heating during accretion, radiative cooling, and thermal feedback triggered by that cooling. The density, temperature, and substructure of the intracluster X-Ray gas therefore represents the entire thermal history of cluster formation. To better understand this thermal history one needs to study the entropy of the gas because entropy is the quantity most directly changed by increasing or decreasing the thermal energy of intracluster gas.

== List of groups and clusters ==
Name / Designation	Notes
Local Group	The group where the Milky Way, including the Earth is located
Virgo Cluster	This cluster of galaxies is the nearest one to us

== See also ==
- Fossil galaxy group
- Galactic orientation
- Galaxy filament
- Illustris project
- Timeline of knowledge about galaxies, clusters of galaxies, and large-scale structure
