= Pisces–Cetus Supercluster Complex =

Galaxy supercluster complex containing the Virgo Supercluster

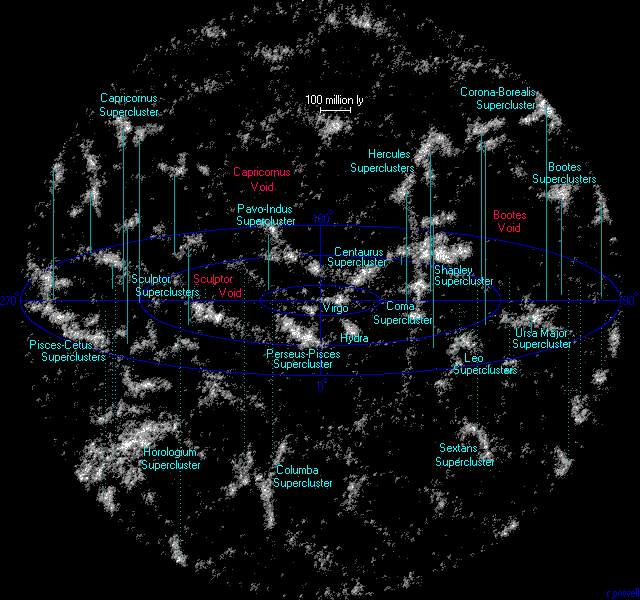
- Map of the local universe within a billion light-years from Earth, including the Pisces–Cetus Supercluster Complex, which is the very long chain of galaxies from the Pisces–Cetus, Sculptor, the Perseus–Pisces and the Laniakea Superclusters (here shown as the smaller Virgo, Hydra, and Centaurus Superclusters)

Observation data (Epoch J2000)
- Constellation(s): Pisces and Cetus (Pisces–Cetus Supercluster)
- Right ascension: 00^{h} 33^{m}
- Declination: −21° 00′
- Parent structure: Local Hole
- Major axis: 1,240 Mly (380 Mpc)h^{−1}_{0.70}
- Minor axis: 520 Mly (160 Mpc)h^{−1}_{0.75}
- Distance: 650 Mly (200 Mpc) (Pisces–Cetus Supercluster)
- Binding mass: ~10^{18} M_{☉}

Other designations
- Pisces–Cetus Supercluster Complex, Pisces–Cetus Complex, Pisces–Cetus SCC, Pisces–Cetus Filament, Local Supercluster Complex

The Pisces–Cetus Supercluster Complex (Pisces–Cetus SCC) or the local superstructure is a galaxy supercluster complex (SCC) that includes the Virgo Supercluster as its outlying member (later confirmed to be part of the Laniakea supercluster), which in turn contains the Local Group and thus the Milky Way. The complex was named after the Pisces–Cetus Superclusters, its richest and most prominent members, which reside in its core and main plane, located at roughly 200 megaparsecs (652 million light-years; 6.17×10^{21} kilometres) away from Earth.

== Observational history ==
Astronomer R. Brent Tully of the University of Hawaii's Institute of Astronomy discovered a very massive agglomeration that includes the Local and Pisces–Cetus Superclusters in 1986, and identified it as the "extended Pisces–Cetus Supercluster", and later the Pisces–Cetus Supercluster Complex in 1987. In addition, four more other nearby supercluster complexes within a redshift of z = 0.1 (roughly 340 megaparsecs) have also been discovered, including Ursa Major, Hercules-Corona Borealis, Leo, and Aquarius Supercluster Complexes. The Aquarius Supercluster Complex was known to contain 25 rich galaxy clusters and is composed of two parts, which are both the Aquarius Region and the Aquarius-Capricornus Region. It along with Pisces–Cetus Supercluster Complex have been shown to contains most of the 114 southern Abell clusters. Only 28 are not associated with these two main complexes, with no other association having more than four members.

Following the discovery of those supercluster complexes at the end of the 20th century, other supercluster complexes were later identified such as Sloan and BOSS Great Walls.

== Extent ==
The Pisces–Cetus Supercluster Complex is estimated to be about 380 megaparsecs (1.24 billion light-years; 1.17×10^{22} kilometres) long and 160 megaparsecs (520 million light-years; 4.9×10^{21} kilometres) wide, making it one of the largest structures known in the observable universe. This brings it to roughly the theoretical limit per the Cosmological Principle. Despite that, larger sizes have been suggested for other structures such as Quipu superstructure, Clowes–Campusano LQG and U1.11, along with the disputed and unconfirmed Huge-LQG, Giant GRB Ring, and Hercules–Corona Borealis Great Wall.

61 rich clusters comprise the complex, which is estimated to have a total mass of approximately 10^{18} times that of the mass of the Sun (M_{☉}). According to the discoverer, the complex is composed of 5 parts:

1. The Pisces–Cetus Superclusters
2. The Perseus–Pegasus chain, including the Perseus–Pisces Supercluster
3. The Pegasus–Pisces chain
4. The Sculptor region, including the Sculptor Superclusters
5. The Laniakea, which contains our Virgo Supercluster (Local Supercluster) as well as the Hydra–Centaurus Supercluster. (Note: Referred to as Virgo–Hydra–Centaurus Supercluster in Tully et al. (1987).)

With its mass of 10^{15} M_{☉}, our Virgo Supercluster accounts for only 0.1 percent of the total mass of the complex. Coma Supercluster was also considered to be part of this complex by the time of its discovery in 1986, which forms the heart of Coma Filament and the larger CfA2 Great Wall.

Latest observations of basins of attraction suggested a basin of attraction around Ophiuchus Cluster may be associated with Laniakea, and also have found both, along with Apus and Coma Superclusters, are moving toward the greater Shapley Attractor and may be thus part of the Shapley Concentration.

== See also ==
- Entropy
- Fossil galaxy group
- Galactic orientation
- Intracluster medium
- Large-scale structure of the universe
- List of galaxy groups and clusters
- Timeline of galaxies and large scale structures
