= Perseus–Pegasus Filament =

Galaxy filament containing the Perseus-Pisces Supercluster

The Perseus–Pegasus Filament is a galaxy filament containing the Perseus–Pisces Supercluster and stretching for over a billion light-years (or over 300/h Mpc). Currently, it is considered to be one of the largest known structures in the universe. (Note: The reference cited claims the Perseus-Pisces Filament as the largest known structure in the universe by the time of its discovery. However, various reports currently cite the Hercules–Corona Borealis Great Wall as the largest at over 3 gigaparsecs (9.8 Gly) across.) As part of the larger Pisces–Cetus Supercluster Complex, this filament is adjacent to the Pisces–Cetus Superclusters, the core and most prominent component of the complex. (Note: The given citation states that Perseus–Pegasus Filament is "adjacent to Pisces–Cetus filament," which refers to the Pisces–Cetus Supercluster Complex. Although its name is not directly mentioned, Tully et al. (1987) suggested both the Perseus-Pegasus chain and the Pegasus-Pisces chain (which form the supposed filament) to be part of the Pisces–Cetus Supercluster Complex. It is possible that the citation referred to the Pisces–Cetus filament as Pisces–Cetus Superclusters, in which the supercluster complex was named after.)

== Discovery ==
While the Perseus–Pegasus Filament was formally discovered by David Batuski and Jack Burns of New Mexico State University in 1985, it is likely that the Lowell Observatory's Clyde Tombaugh, best known for being the discoverer of Pluto, was aware of its existence in 1936 while conducting his search for trans-Saturnian planets. He reported it as the Great Perseus-Andromeda stratum of Extra-Galactic Nebulae. Earlier still, parts of this clustering had been reported by Walter E. Bernheimer.

== See also ==
- Abell catalogue
- Large-scale structure of the universe
- Supercluster
- Big Ring
