= NGC 1161 =

Galaxy in the constellation Perseus

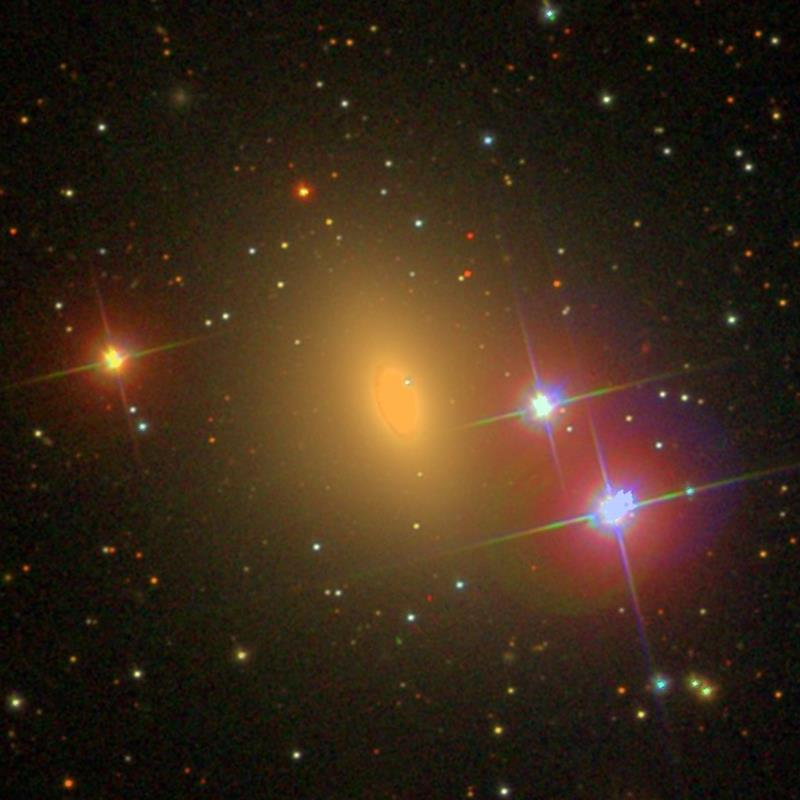
- NGC 1161 (SDSS)

Observation data (J2000.0 epoch)
- Constellation: Perseus
- Right ascension: 03^{h} 01^{m} 14.10^{s}
- Declination: +44° 53′ 50.00″
- Redshift: 0.006518
- Heliocentric radial velocity: 1954 ± 23 km/s
- Distance: 90 Mly
- Apparent magnitude (V): 11.10
- Apparent magnitude (B): 12.10

Characteristics
- Type: S0
- Apparent size (V): 2.8 x 2.0

Other designations
- PGC 11404, MCG +07-07-015, UGC 2474

NGC 1161 is a lenticular galaxy approximately 90 million light-years away from Earth in the constellation of Perseus. It was discovered, along with NGC 1160, by English astronomer William Herschel on October 7, 1784.

NGC 1161 is classified as a Type 1.9 Seyfert galaxy. It forms a visual pair with the galaxy NGC 1160. Both galaxies are located between the Local and Perseus superclusters in the Perseus Cloud close to the centre of the Local Void.

== Image gallery ==
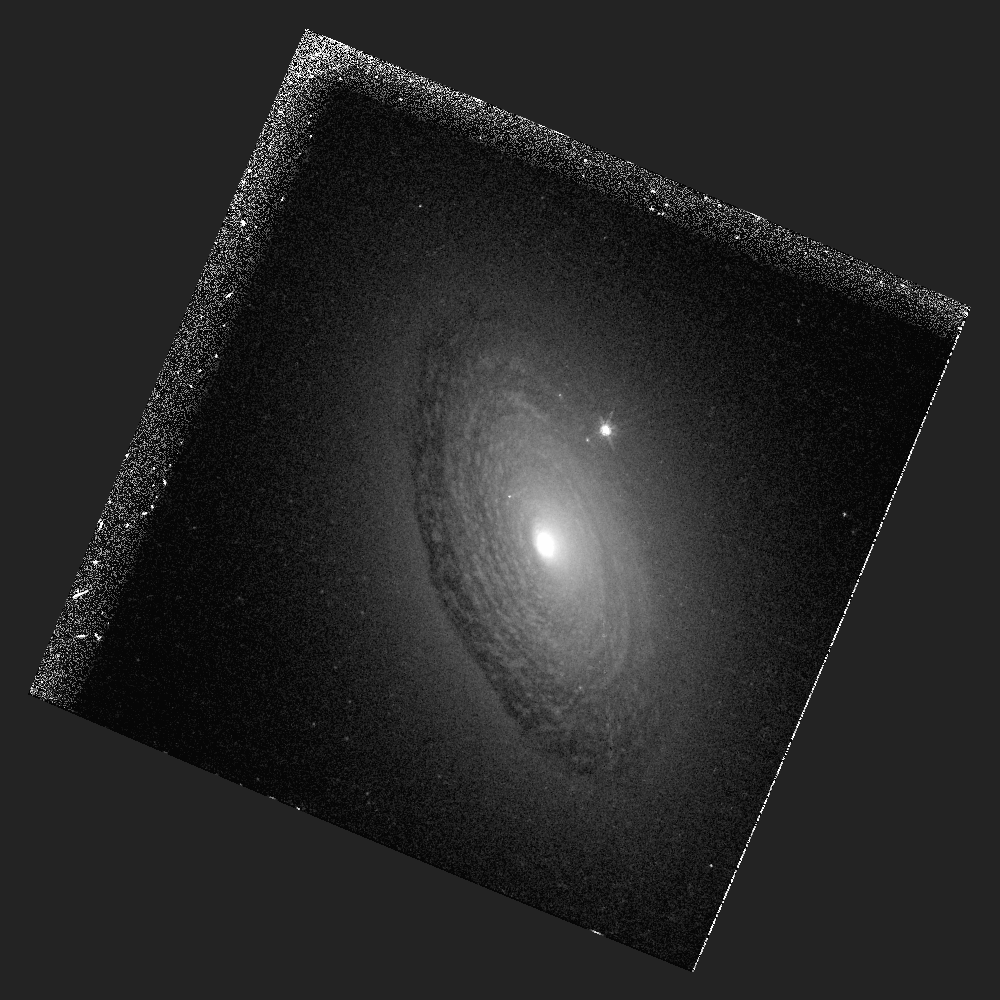
NGC 1161 (NASA/ESA HST)

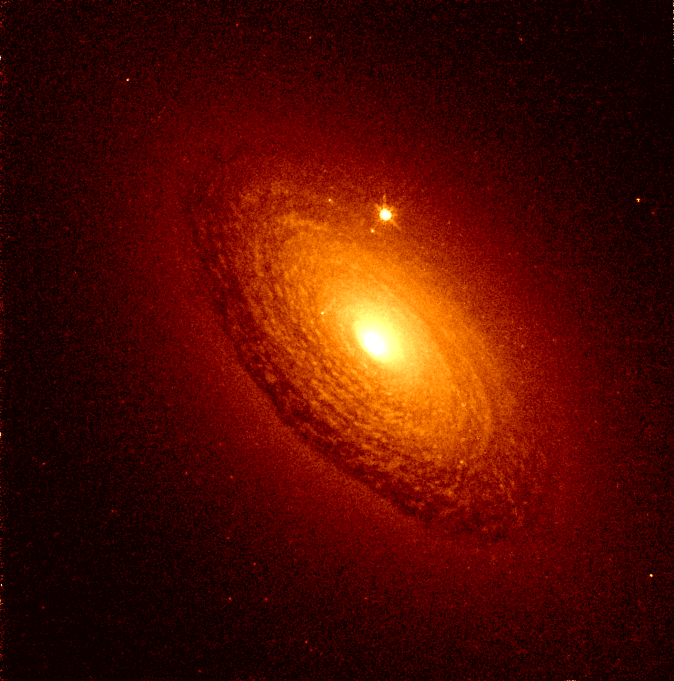
NGC 1161 (NASA/ESA HST)

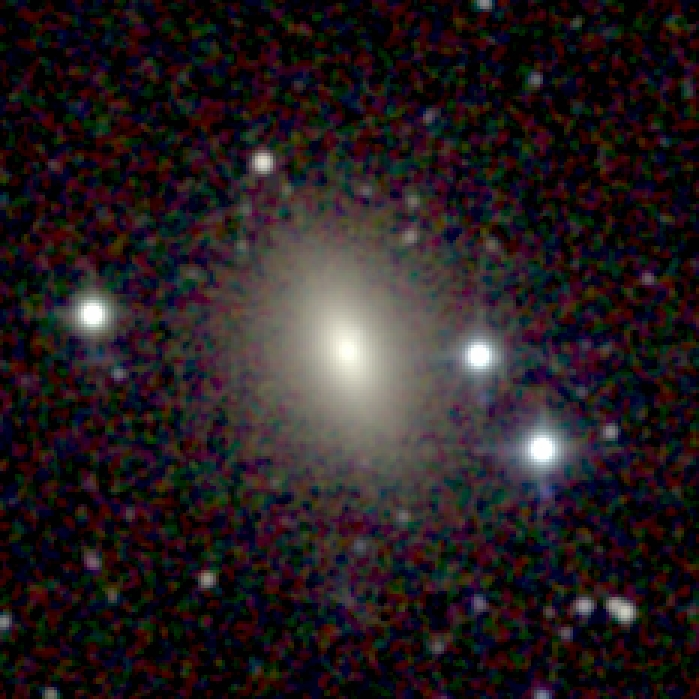
NGC 1161 by 2MASS

== See also ==
- Spiral galaxy
- List of NGC objects (1001–2000)
