= Abell 3266 =

Galaxy cluster in the constellation of Reticulum

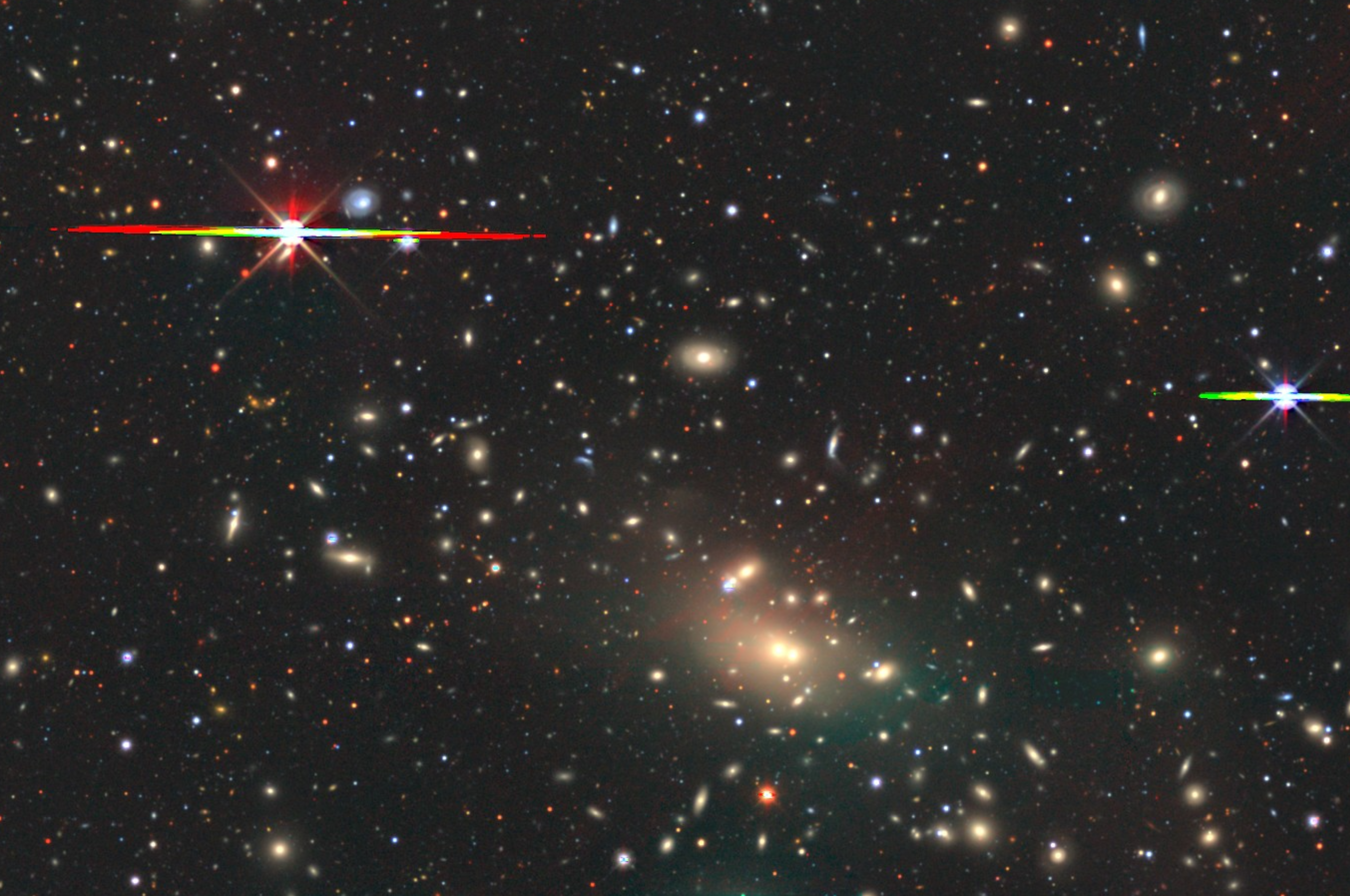
- Abell 3266 seen by DESI Legacy Surveys DR11

Observation data (Epoch J2000)
- Constellation: Reticulum
- Right ascension: 04^{h} 31^{m} 12^{s}
- Declination: −61° 28′ 00″
- Richness class: 2
- Bautz–Morgan classification: I-II
- Velocity dispersion: 3.136 km/s
- Redshift: 0.05890 (17 658 km/s)
- Distance: 248 Mpc (809 Mly) h^{−1}_{0.705}
- X-ray flux: 3.5×10^{−11} erg s^{−1} cm^{−2} (0.5–2 keV)

Abell 3266 is a galaxy cluster in the southern sky that is part of the Horologium-Reticulum Supercluster. It is one of the largest in the southern sky, after Shapley Supercluster which has 28 galaxy clusters, and Sculptor Superclusters which has 25 galaxy clusters. The Horologium-Reticulum Supercluster has one of the largest mass concentrations in the nearby universe and has a total of 35 galaxy clusters.

The Department of Physics at the University of Maryland, Baltimore County discovered that a large mass of gas is hurtling through the cluster at a speed of 750 km/s (466 miles/second). The mass is billions of solar masses, approximately 3 million light-years in diameter, and is the largest of its kind discovered as of June 2006.

The Central Dominant galaxy of Abell 3266 (WISEA J043113.14-612712.3) is a large, bright, moderately elongated elliptical galaxy, with an effective radius of 98.44 kpc (approximately 321,000 light years) and an absolute magnitude of M_V = -24.51. Abell 3266 has at least 100++ confirmed members and has been reference in over 1400 scientific papers.

== See also ==
- Abell catalogue
- List of Abell clusters
- X-ray astronomy

== Gallery ==
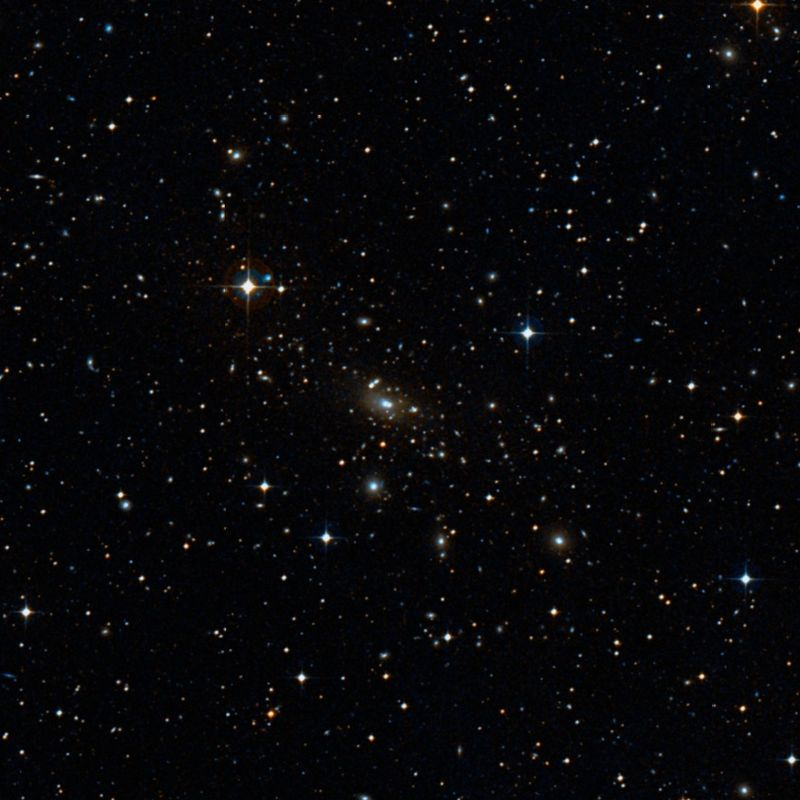
Abell 3266

Abell 3266 seen by Gemini Multi-Object Spectrograph (GMOS)

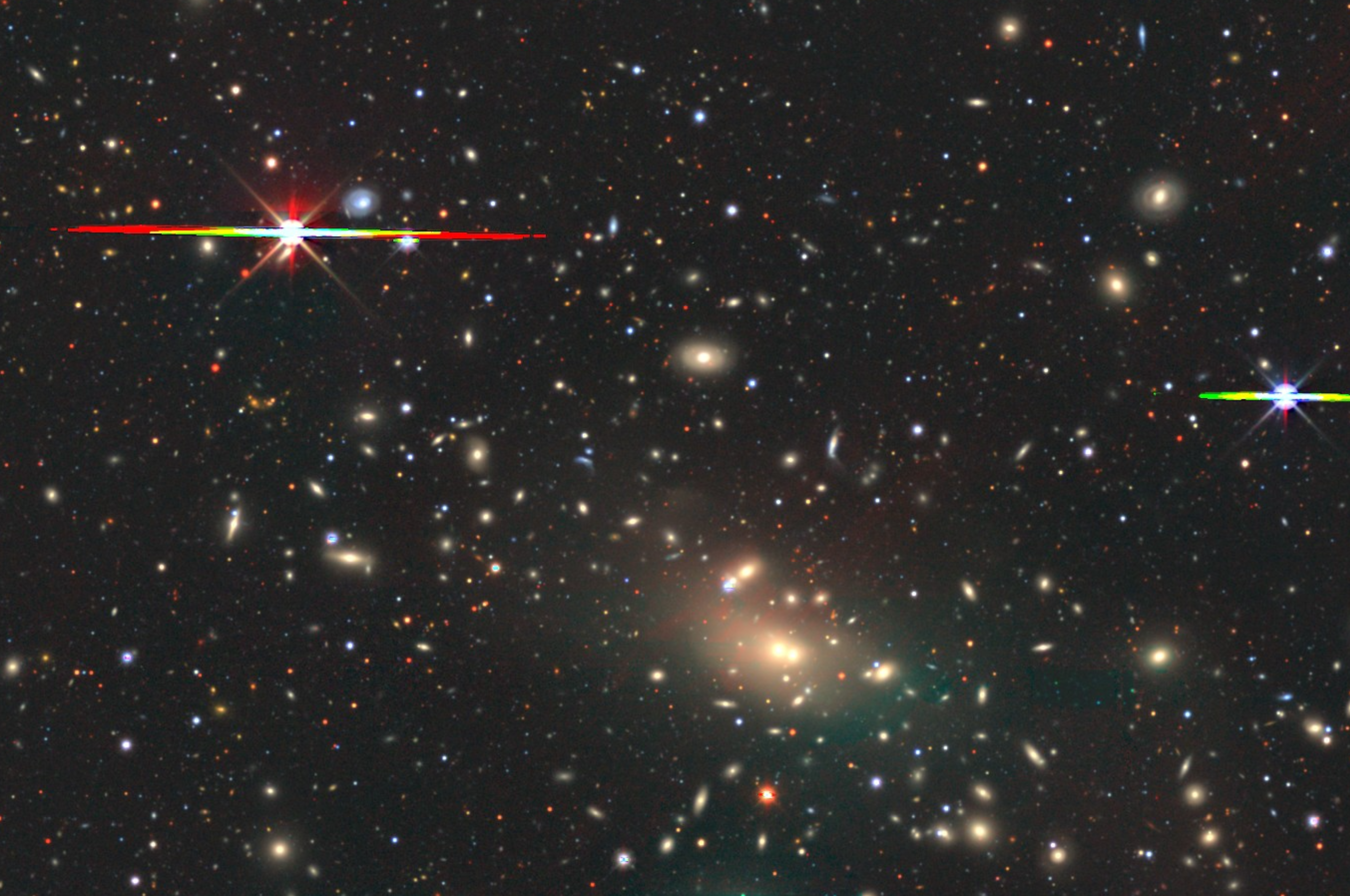
Abell 3266 seen by the DESI Legacy Surveys DR11

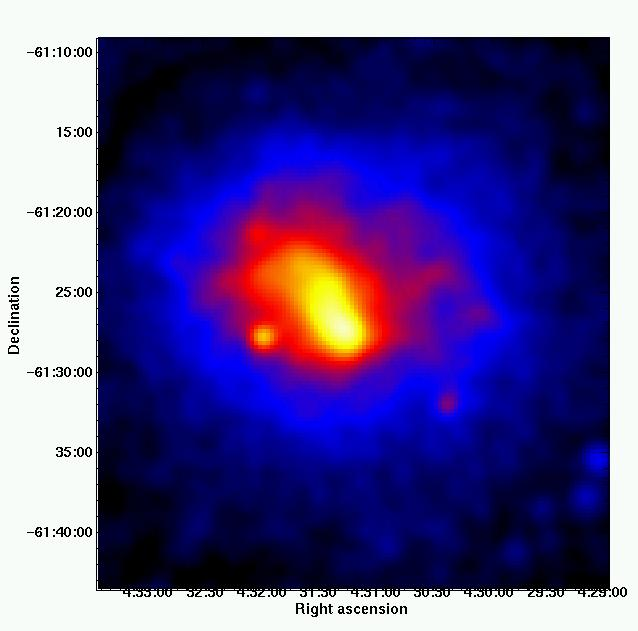
Abell 3266 seen by ROSAT
