= Quipu (cosmic structure) =

Cosmic superstructure; galaxy hypercluster

Quipu is a cosmic superstructure, a wall of galaxies or galaxy hypercluster composed of knots of galaxy clusters. As of 2025, it is the largest known structure in the Universe, some 400 megaparsecs or 1.3 billion light years long (1.3×10^{9} light-years (7.6×10^{21} mi; 1.2×10^{22} km)); and the most massive known structure, containing 2×10^{17} solar masses (4.0×10^{47} kg; 8.8×10^{47} lb; 4.0×10^{44} t), or about 200,000 times the mass of the Milky Way.

The structure was discovered by Hans Böhringer and colleagues using data from the ROSAT X-ray satellite, and described in a 2025 paper on arXiv. It was named "quipu" as it is reminiscent of the Andean knotted textile called quipu that Böhringer had seen in a museum near Santiago, Chile, while he was working at the European Southern Observatory.

== See also ==
- Shapley Supercluster
- Laniakea Supercluster
- Virgo Supercluster
- Hydra-Centaurus Supercluster
- Perseus-Pisces Supercluster
- Coma Supercluster
- Saraswati Supercluster
