= Largest structures =

Largest structure(s) may refer to:

- List of largest cosmic structures, the largest structures in the universe
- Megastructure, the largest man-made structures
- Largest organisms, the largest living structures
