= NGC 1160 =

Spiral galaxy in the Perseus constellation

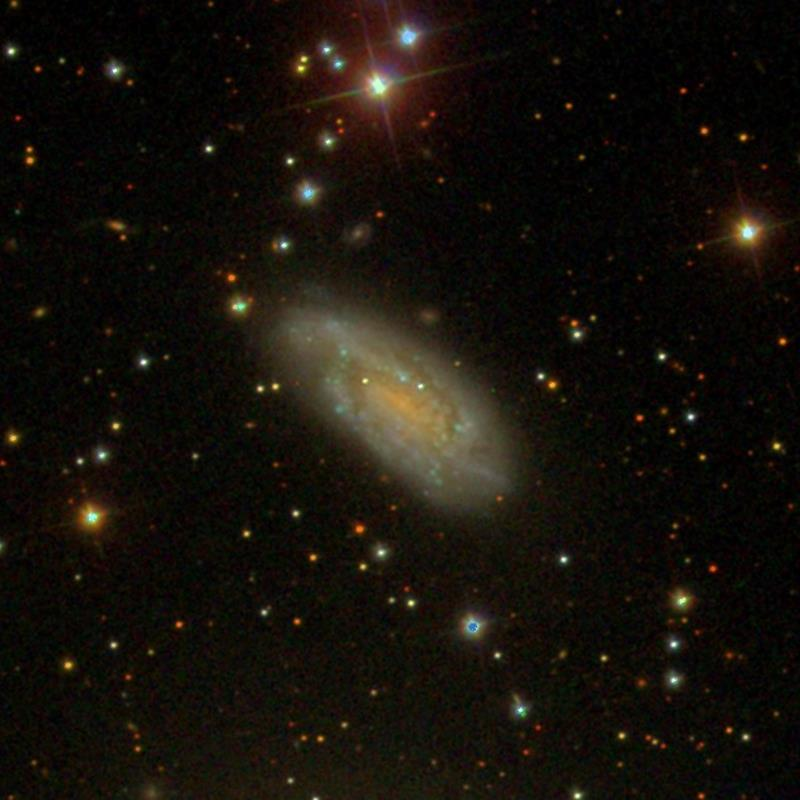
- NGC 1160 (SDSS)

Observation data (J2000.0 epoch)
- Constellation: Perseus
- Right ascension: 03^{h} 01^{m} 13.20^{s}
- Declination: +44° 57′ 20.00″
- Redshift: 0.008432
- Heliocentric radial velocity: 2528 ± 5 km/s
- Distance: 116 Mly
- Apparent magnitude (V): 12.80
- Apparent magnitude (B): 13.50

Characteristics
- Type: Scd
- Apparent size (V): 1.9 x 0.9

Other designations
- PGC 11403, MCG +07-07-014, UGC 2475

NGC 1160 is a spiral galaxy approximately 116 million light-years away from Earth in the constellation of Perseus. It was discovered, along with NGC 1161, by English astronomer William Herschel on October 7, 1784.

NGC 1160 forms a visual pair with the galaxy NGC 1161. Both galaxies are located between the Local and Perseus superclusters.

== See also ==
- Spiral galaxy
- List of NGC objects (1001–2000)
- Perseus (constellation)
