= LQG =

LQG may refer to:

- Loop quantum gravity, a theory that aims to merge quantum mechanics and general relativity
- Liouville quantum gravity, a theory of gravity on two-dimensional surfaces
- Linear–quadratic–Gaussian control, an optimal control problem
- Large quasar group, a massive collection of black holes and the largest known object in the universe
