= MS 0302+17 =

Galaxy supercluster in the constellation Aries

MS 0302+17 Supercluster

Observation data (Epoch J2000)
- Constellation: Aries
- Right ascension: 03^{h} 05^{m} 25.8^{s}
- Declination: +17° 17′ 54″
- Redshift: z = 0.42
- Distance: 4,485 Gly

MS 0302+17 is a galaxy supercluster located in the constellation Aries at a distance of 4.485 billion light years (lookback time), equivalent to a comoving distance of 5.338 billion light years. The dimensions are around 6 million parsecs.

== Overview ==
MS 0302+17 contains three massive galaxy clusters. Of these the first, known as CL 0303+1706 was discovered by Alan Вressler and Jim Gunn, using a conventional optical telescope; it is located along the eastern edge of the supercluster and consists of an important concentration of reddish galaxies. Observations made with the Einstein X-ray Observatory revealed the existence of two other clusters: MS 0302+1659 and MS 0302+1717, which are located near the northern edge of the observation field. The MS prefix derives from Medium Sensitivity because X-ray observations are part of the Einstein Medium Sensitivity Survey. An interesting fact of the survey is a couple of giant arches located near the luminous central galaxies of MS0302+1659, images of remote galaxies enhanced by the gravitational lensing phenomenon created by the supercluster.
