= Horologium-Reticulum Supercluster =

Supercluster in the constellations Horologium and Eridanus

Horologium Supercluster
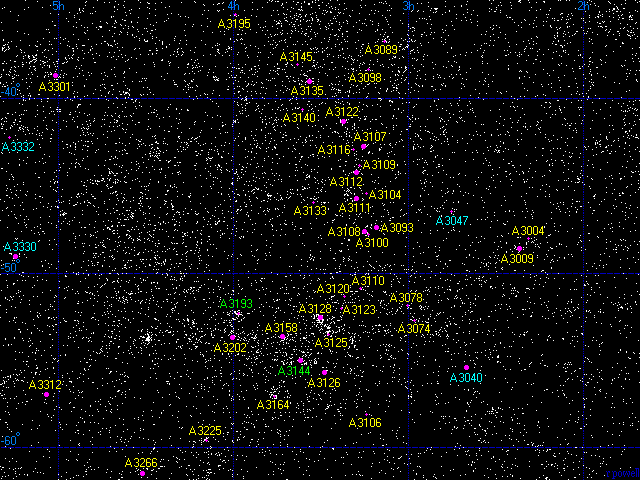
- A map of the Horologium Supercluster

Observation data (Epoch )
- Constellation(s): Horologium and Eridanus
- Right ascension: 03^{h} 19^{m}
- Declination: −50° 02′
- Major axis: 169 Mpc (551 Mly)
- Distance: 291.4 Mpc (950 Mly)
- Binding mass: ~10^{17} M_{☉}

Other designations
- Horologium-Reticulum Supercluster; MSCC 117

The Horologium-Reticulum Supercluster, is a massive supercluster spanning around 550 million light-years. It has a mass of around 10^{17} solar masses, similar to that of the Laniakea Supercluster, which houses the Milky Way. It is centered on coordinates right ascension 03^{h} 19^{m} and declination −50° 02′, and spans an angular area of 12° × 12°.

The nearest part of the supercluster is 700 million light-years away from Earth, while the far end of it is 1.2 billion light-years. It is visible in the constellations Horologium and Eridanus. The Horologium Supercluster has about 5,000 galaxy groups (30,000 giant galaxies and 300,000 dwarf galaxies). It includes the galaxy cluster Abell 3266.

The first observation of the Horologium Supercluster was in 1899; Harlow Shapley noticed it in 1935. The first attempt to study the supercluster after Shapley was in 1983.

== Members ==
The Horologium-Reticulum Supercluster (SCL 48) is a supercluster that contains approximately 35 galaxy clusters, making it one of the largest in the local universe and it is the second largest in the Main Supercluster Catalogue (MSCC) catalog. The galaxy clusters which are Abell 3004, 3009, 3045, 3074, 3077, 3078, 3089, 3093, 3098, 3100, 3104, 3106, 3108, 3109, 3110, 3111, 3112, 3116, 3120, 3122, 3123, 3125, 3128, 3133, 3135, 3142, 3145, 3154, 3158, 3161, 3164, 3195, 3202, 3225, 3266. However, there is another catalog that suggests that there is another 30 additional galaxy clusters such as Abell 383.

== See also ==
- Abell catalogue
- Large-scale structure of the universe
- List of Abell clusters
- List of superclusters
- List of largest cosmic structures
