= Galactic orientation =

Spatial orientation of a galactic plane

A galactic orientation describes the spatial orientation of a galactic plane, where such exists for a given galaxy. For a spiral galaxy, this can be obtained from the inclination of the galactic plane to the plane of the sky, and the position angle of the major axis as viewed from Earth. The result yields a direction perpendicular to the galactic plane. In the case of the Milky Way, this is given by the coordinates of the galactic pole.

Galactic clusters are gravitationally bound large-scale structures of multiple galaxies. The evolution of these aggregates is determined by time and manner of formation and the process of how their structures and constituents have been changing with time. Gamow (1952) and Weizscker (1951) showed that the observed rotations of galaxies are important for cosmology. They postulated that the rotation of galaxies might be a clue of physical conditions under which these systems formed. Thus, understanding the distribution of spatial orientations of the spin vectors of galaxies is critical to understanding the origin of the angular momenta of galaxies.

There are mainly three scenarios for the origin of galaxy clusters and superclusters. These models are based on different assumptions of the primordial conditions, so they predict different spin vector alignments of the galaxies. The three hypotheses are the pancake model, the hierarchy model, and the primordial vorticity theory. The three are mutually exclusive as they produce contradictory predictions. However, the predictions made by all three theories are based on the precepts of cosmology. Thus, these models can be tested using a database with appropriate methods of analysis.

== Galaxies ==
A galaxy is a large gravitational aggregation of stars, dust, gas, and an unknown component termed dark matter. The Milky Way Galaxy is only one of the billions of galaxies in the known universe. Galaxies are classified into spirals, ellipticals, irregular, and peculiar. Sizes can range from only a few thousand stars (dwarf irregulars) to 10^{13} stars in giant ellipticals. Elliptical galaxies are spherical or elliptical in appearance. Spiral galaxies range from S0, the lenticular galaxies, to Sb, which have a bar across the nucleus, to Sc galaxies which have strong spiral arms. In total count, ellipticals amount to 13%, S0 to 22%, Sa, b, c galaxies to 61%, irregulars to 3.5%, and peculiars to 0.9%.

At the center of most galaxies is a high concentration of older stars. This portion of a galaxy is called the nuclear bulge. Beyond the nuclear bulge lies a large disc containing young, hot stars, called the disk of the galaxy. There is a morphological separation: Ellipticals are most common in clusters of galaxies, and typically the center of a cluster is occupied by a giant elliptical. Spirals are most common in the field, i.e., not in clusters.

== Primordial Vorticity Model ==
The primordial vorticity theory predicts that the spin vectors of galaxies are distributed primarily perpendicular to the cluster plane. The primordial vorticity is called top-down scenario. Sometimes it is also called turbulence model. In the turbulence scenario, first flattened rotating proto-clusters formed due to cosmic vorticity in the early universe. Subsequent density and pressure fluctuations caused galaxies to form.

The idea that galaxy formation is initiated by primordial turbulence has a long history. Ozernoy (1971, 1978) proposes that galaxies form from high-density regions behind the shocks produced by turbulence. According to the primordial vorticity theory, the presence of large chaotic velocities generates turbulence, which, in turn, produces density and pressure fluctuations.

Density fluctuations on the scale of clusters of galaxies could be gravitationally bound, but galactic mass fluctuations are always unbound. Galaxies form when unbound galactic mass eddies, expanding faster than their bound cluster background. So forming galaxies collide with each other as clusters start to recollapse. These collisions produce shocks and high-density proto-galaxies at the eddy interfaces. As clusters recollapse, the system of galaxies undergoes a violent collective relaxation.

== Pancake Model ==
The pancake model was first proposed in the 1970s by Yakob B. Zel'dovich at the Institute of Applied Mathematics in Moscow.

The pancake model predicts that the spin vectors of galaxies tend to lie within the cluster plane. In the pancake scenario, formation of clusters took place first and it was followed by their fragmentation into galaxies due to adiabatic fluctuations. According to the non-linear gravitational instability theory, a growth of small inhomogeneities leads to the formation of thin, dense, and gaseous condensations that are called `pancakes'. These condensations are compressed and heated to high temperatures by shock waves causing them to quickly fragment into gas clouds. The later clumping of these clouds results in the formation of galaxies and their clusters.

Thermal, hydrodynamic, and gravitational instabilities arise during the course of evolution. It leads to the fragmentation of gaseous proto-clusters and, subsequently, clustering of galaxies takes place. The pancake scheme follows three simultaneous processes: first, gas cools and new clouds of cold gas form; secondly, these clouds cluster to form galaxies; and thirdly, the forming galaxies and, to an extent, single clouds cluster together to form a cluster of galaxies.

== Hierarchy Model ==
According to the hierarchy model, the directions of the spin vectors should be distributed randomly. In hierarchy model, galaxies were first formed and then they obtained their angular momenta by tidal force while they were gathering gravitationally to form a cluster. Those galaxies grow by subsequent merging of proto-galactic condensations or even by merging of already fully formed galaxies. In this scheme, one could imagine that large irregularities like galaxies grew under the influence of gravities from small imperfections in the early universe.

The angular momentum transferred to a developing proto-galaxy by the gravitational interaction of the quadrupole moment of the system with the tidal field of the matter.
