= Huge-LQG =

Large Quasar Group

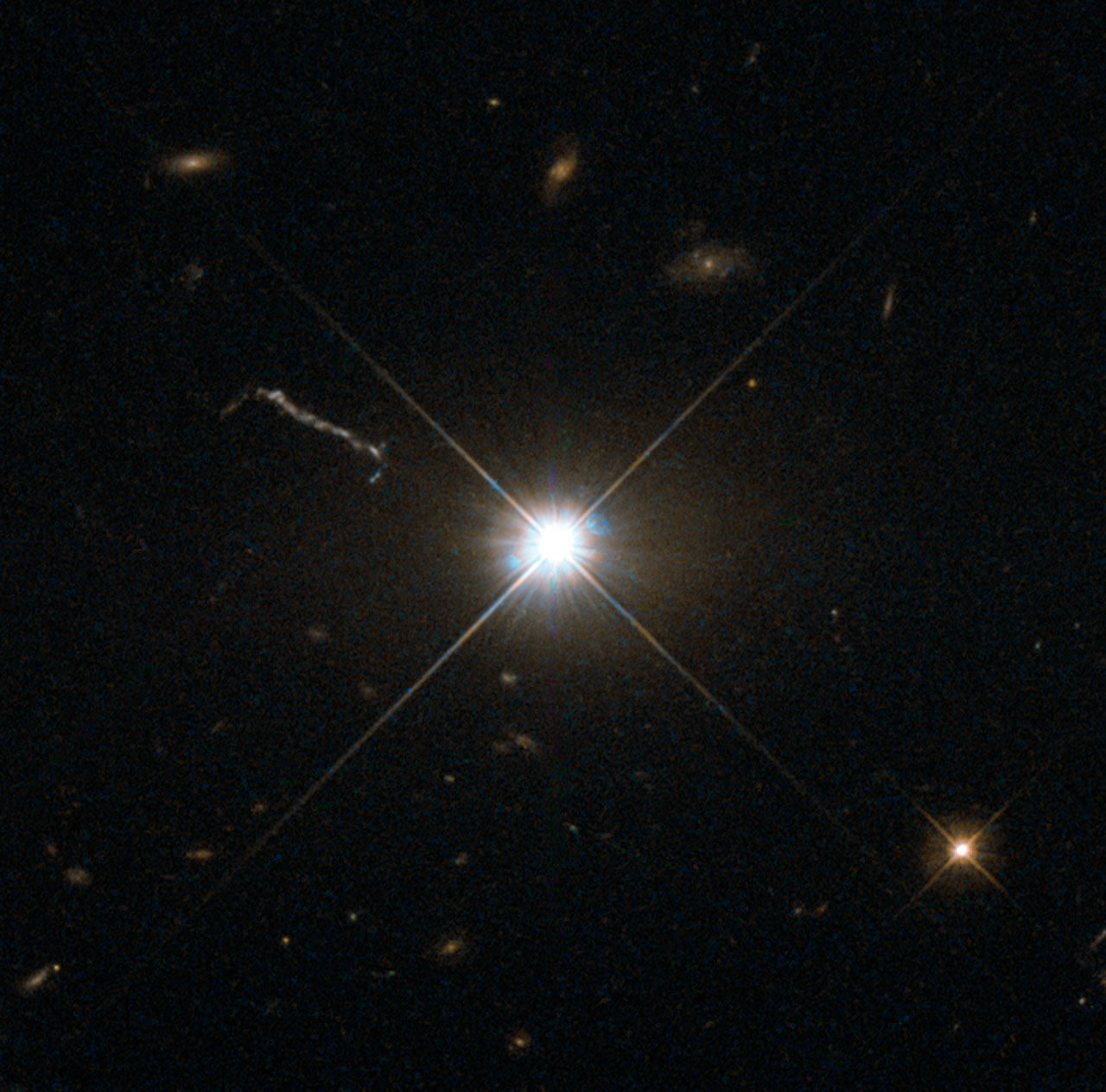
Above: Map of the Huge-LQG noted by black circles, adjacent to the Clowes–Campusano LQG in red crosses. Map is by Roger Clowes of University of Central Lancashire. Bottom: Image of the bright quasar 3C 273. Each black circle and red cross on the upper image map is a quasar similar to this one.

The Huge Large Quasar Group, (Huge-LQG, also called U1.27) is a possible structure or pseudo-structure of 73 quasars, referred to as a large quasar group, that measures about 4 billion light-years across. At its discovery, it was identified as the largest and the most massive known structure in the observable universe, though it has been superseded by the Hercules–Corona Borealis Great Wall at 10 billion light-years. Its existence has been disputed.

== Discovery ==
Roger G. Clowes, together with colleagues from the University of Central Lancashire in Preston, United Kingdom, had reported on January 11, 2013 a grouping of quasars within the vicinity of the constellation Leo. They used data from the DR7QSO catalogue of the comprehensive Sloan Digital Sky Survey, a major multi-imaging and spectroscopic redshift survey of the sky. They reported that the grouping was, as they announced, the largest known structure in the observable universe. The structure was initially discovered in November 2012 and took two months of verification before its announcement. News about the structure's announcement spread worldwide, and has received great attention from the scientific community.

== Characteristics ==
The Huge-LQG was estimated to be about 1.24 Gpc in length, by 640 Mpc and 370 Mpc on the other dimensions, and contains 73 quasars, respectively. Quasars are very luminous active galactic nuclei, thought to be supermassive black holes feeding on matter. Since they are only found in dense regions of the universe, quasars can be used to find overdensities of matter within the universe. It has the approximate binding mass of 6.1×10^{18} (6.1 trillion (long scale) or 6.1 quintillion (short scale)) M_{☉}. The Huge-LQG was initially named U1.27 due to its average redshift of 1.27 (where the "U" refers to a connected unit of quasars), placing its distance at about 9 billion light-years from Earth.

The Huge-LQG is 615 Mpc from the Clowes–Campusano LQG (U1.28), a group of 34 quasars also discovered by Clowes in 1991.

== Cosmological principle ==
In Clowes's initial announcement of the structure, he reported that the structure has contradicted the cosmological principle. The cosmological principle implies that at sufficiently large scales, the universe is approximately homogeneous, meaning that the statistical fluctuations in quantities such as the matter density between different regions of the universe are small. However, different definitions exist for the homogeneity scale above which these fluctuations may be considered sufficiently small, and the appropriate definition depends on the context in which it is used. Jaswant Yadav et al. have suggested a definition of the homogeneity scale based on the fractal dimension of the universe; they conclude that, according to this definition, an upper limit for the homogeneity scale in the universe is 260/h Mpc. Some studies that have attempted to measure the homogeneity scale according to this definition have found values in the range 70–130/h Mpc.

The Sloan Great Wall, discovered in 2003, has a length of 423 Mpc, which is marginally larger than the homogeneity scale as defined above.

The Huge-LQG is three times longer than, and twice as wide as the Yadav et al. upper limit to the homogeneity scale, and has therefore been claimed to challenge our understanding of the universe on large scales.

However, due to the existence of long-range correlations, it is known that structures can be found in the distribution of galaxies in the universe that extend over scales larger than the homogeneity scale.

== Dispute ==
One of the questions that arose after the discovery of the Huge-LQG was regarding the method used in its identification. In the initial paper by Clowes et al., the standard used was statistical friend-of-friends method, which has also been used to identify other similar LQGs.

This method has been put into question in a paper by Seshadri Nadathur from Bielefeld University. By utilizing a new map that includes all the quasars in the region (including those not included from the 73 quasars of the group), the presence of a structure became less noticeable.

After performing a number of statistical analyses on the quasar data, and finding extreme changes in the Huge-LQG membership and shape with small changes in the cluster finding parameters, he determined the probability that apparent clusters the size of the Huge-LQG would appear in a random assortment of quasars, by utilizing the similar friends-of-friends method originally used. Using a Monte Carlo method of at least a thousand runs, he generated a set of random points in three-dimensional space and identified 10,000 regions identical in size to that studied by Clowes, and filled them with randomly distributed quasars with the same position statistics as did the actual quasars in the sky. The original method by Clowes produces at least a thousand clusterings identical to the Huge-LQG, even on regions where one should expect the distribution to be truly random. The data is supporting the study of the homogeneity scale by Yadav et al., and that there is, therefore, no challenge to the cosmological principle. The identification of the Huge-LQG, together with the clusterings identified by Nadathur, is therefore referred to be false positive identifications or errors due to a miscalculation of the statistical measurement used, finally arriving at the conclusion that the Huge-LQG is not a real structure at all.

Nevertheless, Clowes et al. found independent support for the reality of the structure from its coincidence with Mg II absorbers (once-ionised magnesium gas, commonly used to probe distant galaxies). The Mg II gas suggests that the Huge-LQG is associated with an enhancement of the mass, rather than being a false positive identification. This point is not discussed by the critical paper.

Further support for the reality of the Huge-LQG comes from the work of Hutsemékers et al. in September 2014. They measured the polarization of quasars in the Huge-LQG and found "a remarkable correlation" of the polarization vectors on scales larger than 500 Mpc.

== See also ==
- CfA2 Great Wall
- Galaxy filament
- The Giant Arc
- Large-scale structure of the cosmos
- Pisces–Cetus Supercluster Complex
