= Giant GRB Ring =

Ring of nine gamma-ray bursts

The Giant GRB Ring is a ring of 9 gamma-ray bursts (GRBs) that may be associated with one of the largest known cosmic structures. It was discovered in July 2015 by a team of Hungarian and American astronomers led by L.G. Balazs while analyzing data from different gamma-ray and X-ray telescopes, in particular the Swift Spacecraft.

The ring of GRBs lies at a distance of about 2.8 gigaparsecs (9.1 billion light years) from Earth at the redshift between 0.78 and 0.86 and measures about 1.72 gigaparsecs (5.6 billion light years) in diameter, making it one of the largest structures known.

Typically, the distribution of GRBs in the universe appears in the sets of less than the 2σ distribution, or with fewer than two GRBs in the average data of the point-radius system. Thus, such a concentration as this appears extremely unlikely, given accepted theoretical models. Proposals include the existence of a giant supergalactic structure. This would be an extremely huge structure of the universe, with a mean size of about 5.6 billion light years. Such a supercluster can explain the significant distribution of GRBs because of its tie to star formation. If such a structure did exist, it would be one of the largest structures of the observable universe and would exceed the 1.2 billion light year size threshold of the currently accepted model of cosmology, potentially challenging the cosmological principle.

== Discovery ==
In early July 2015, after the discovery of the Hercules–Corona Borealis Great Wall, I. Horvath, J. Hakkila and Z. Bagoly, among others, conducted a further detailed analysis of the spatial distribution of GRBs within the distant universe. Provided by more than 15 years of data from the Swift Gamma-Ray Burst Mission, amongst other ground-based telescopes, they assessed the data to see if any more structures can be seen using the method of GRB correlation. They noticed a significant clustering of GRBs within z = 0.78–0.86, with nine GRBs concentrated in that region of 43 by 30 degrees of the sky. With further tests and analyses of the clustering, they found out that the sample had a higher concentration than the expected normal level, indication of a massive galactic structure within the vicinity.

== Characteristics ==
The authors list the following characteristics for the 9 GRBs in the ring (l and b are standard Sun-referenced galactic coordinates).

Coordinates of GRB objects in the Giant GRB Ring
GRB ID	Redshift	Distance (Mpc)	l (deg)	b (deg)
040924	0.859	2866	149.05	−42.52
101225A	0.847	2836	114.45	−17.20
080710	0.845	2831	118.43	−42.96
050824	0.828	2786	123.46	−39.99
071112C	0.823	2772	150.37	−28.43
051022	0.809	2736	106.53	−41.28
100816A	0.804	2723	101.39	−32.53
120729A	0.800	2712	123.85	−12.65
060202	0.785	2672	142.92	−20.54

It is approximately 9.1 billion light years from Earth and about 5.6 billion light years across.
