= Saraswati Supercluster =

Supercluster of galaxies in the Pisces constellation

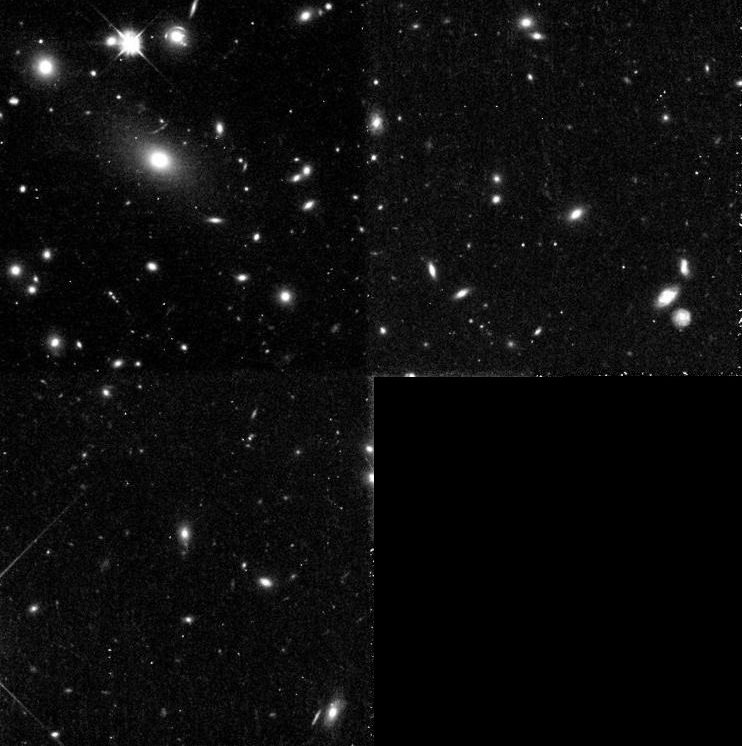
- Saraswati Supercluster is centred on the galaxy cluster Abell 2631, which is the most massive structure in the supercluster

Observation data (Epoch J2000.0)
- Constellation: Pisces
- Right ascension: 23^{h} 37^{m} 40^{s}
- Declination: 00° 16′ 17″
- Number of galaxies: 43 clusters
- Major axis: 200 Mpc (652 Mly)
- Redshift: 0.28
- Distance: 1.2 Gpc (4 Gly)
- Binding mass: 2.0×10^{16} M_{☉}

The Saraswati Supercluster is a massive galaxy supercluster about 1.2 gigaparsecs (4 billion light years) away within the Stripe 82 region of SDSS, in the direction of the constellation Pisces. It is one of the largest structures found in the universe, with a major axis in diameter of about 200 Mpc (652 million light years). It consists of at least 43 galaxy clusters, and has the mass of 2 × 10^{16} M_{☉}, forming a galaxy filament.

== Etymology ==
The supercluster was named after the Hindu goddess of knowledge Saraswati, as well as the legendary Saraswati River (commonly identified with present-day Ghaggar-Hakra River); since the Sanskrit name also means “ever flowing stream with many pools”, and the supercluster has many clusters and groups moving and merging together.

== Discovery ==
The Saraswati Supercluster was discovered by a team of astrophysicists from the Inter-University Centre for Astronomy and Astrophysics and Indian Institute of Science Education and Research led by Joydeep Bagchi and colleagues in Pune, India in 2017.

Analyzing the data of Stripe 82 of the comprehensive Sloan Digital Sky Survey, particularly the sets of LOWZ data from the Baryon Oscillation Spectroscopic Survey, part of the DR12 catalogue of the SDSS, the team discovered an overdensity of the sampled 625 galaxies from LOWZ and 3,016 from the LEGACY-BOSS-SOUTHERN, a survey of the southern sky that is also a part of SDSS DR12.

== Cosmology ==
The Saraswati Supercluster is one of the largest and most massive superclusters known, comparable to the massive Shapley Concentration in the nearby universe. The supercluster consists of 43 massive galaxy clusters, the most massive being Abell 2631 and ZwCL 2341.1+0000 respectively. It is surrounded by a network of galaxy filaments, clusters, and voids.

The Saraswati Supercluster and its environs reveal that some extreme large-scale, prominent matter density enhancements had formed in the past when dark energy had just started to dominate structure formation. This galactic concentration sheds light on the role of dark energy and cosmological initial conditions in supercluster formation.
