= Ophiuchus Supercluster =

Galaxy supercluster in the constellation Ophiuchus

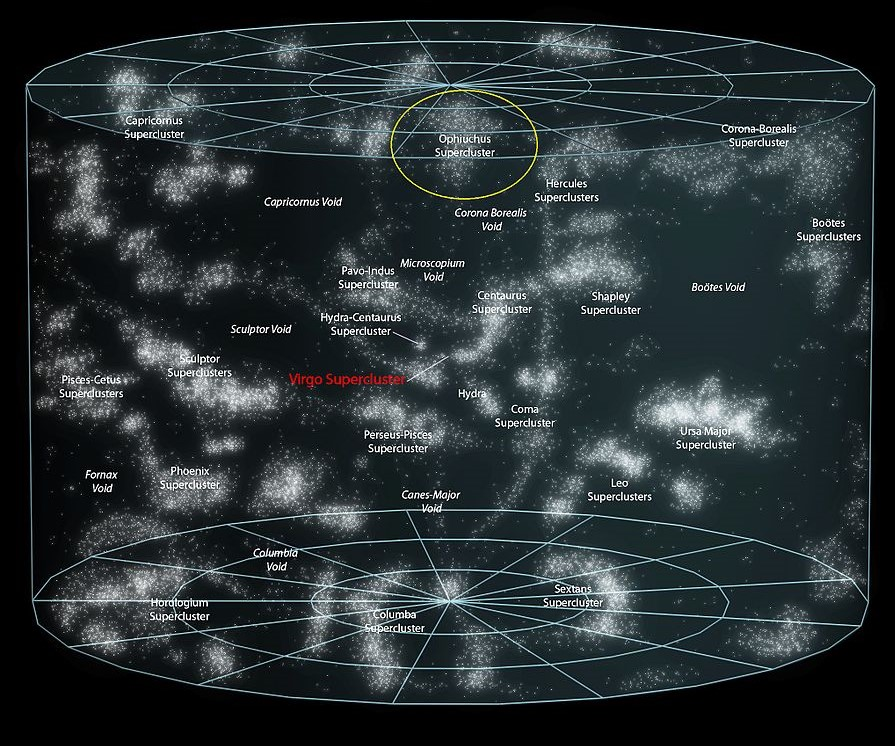
- The local universe, including the Ophiuchus Supercluster as shown above

Observation data (Epoch J2000)
- Constellation: Ophiuchus
- Right ascension: 13^{h} 25^{m} 00^{s}
- Declination: −30° 00′ 00″
- Parent structure: Laniakea Supercluster
- Major axis: 303 Mly (92.8 Mpc) (Note: The calculated volume in Valade et al. (2024) is 0.80×10^{6} Mpc per cube.)
- Redshift: z = 0.028
- Distance: 455 ± 32.0 Mly (139.6 ± 9.8 Mpc) h^{−1}_{67.80 ± 0.077} (Ophiuchus Cluster)

Other designations
- Ophiuchus Supercluster, Oph Supercl, Ophiuchus BoA

The Ophiuchus Supercluster is a nearby galaxy supercluster in the constellation Ophiuchus. The supercluster forms the far wall of the Ophiuchus Void; it may also be connected in a filament with the Pavo-Indus-Telescopium and the Hercules Superclusters. This supercluster is centered on the cD cluster (Abell class type I) Ophiuchus Cluster, and has at least two more galaxy clusters, four more galaxy groups, and several field galaxies as members.

== Significance ==
In 2014, it was identified that the Ophiuchus Cluster, alongside its surroundings, is part of a greater supercluster, Laniakea—a basin of attraction centered on the Great Attractor, in which the Virgo Supercluster is also now considered a lobe of. (Note: Although not directly stated in Tully et al. (2014), the said paper mentioned "an extension to the Ophiuchus Cluster") A subsequent study based on observations of basins of attraction suggested a basin of attraction around Ophiuchus Cluster may be associated with Laniakea, and also have found both are moving toward the Shapley Concentration. They have hence been suggested to be likely part of this even larger structure.

In February 2020, astronomers reported that a 1.5 million light-year wide cavity in the Ophiuchus Supercluster originated from the central galaxy of the Ophiuchus Cluster. The cD galaxy, NeVe 1, is the site of the Ophiuchus Supercluster eruption, triggered by the ejection of ~270 million solar masses (M_{☉}) from the supermassive black hole of NeVe 1, called WISEA J171227.81-232210.7. This may be the largest known explosion in the observable universe since the Big Bang.

== Discovery ==
Ken-ichi Wakamatsu of Gifu University and Matthew Malkan discovered Ophiuchus Cluster in 1981 on Palomar Schmidt IV-N Plates during a hidden globular cluster survey. Perhaps, determining characteristics of a supercluster will help to more correctly explain the excess velocity component of the local group of galaxies.
