= Large quasar group =

Large astronomical structure

A large quasar group (LQG) is a collection of quasars (a form of supermassive black hole active galactic nuclei) that form what are thought to constitute the largest astronomical structures in the observable universe. LQGs are thought to be precursors to the sheets, walls and filaments of galaxies found in the relatively nearby universe.

== Prominent LQGs ==
On January 11, 2013, the discovery of the Huge-LQG was announced by the University of Central Lancashire, as the largest known structure in the universe by that time. It is composed of 74 quasars and has a minimum diameter of 1.4 billion light-years, but over 4 billion light-years at its widest point. According to researcher and author, Roger Clowes, the existence of structures with the size of LQGs was believed theoretically impossible. Cosmological structures had been believed to have a size limit of approximately 1.2 billion light-years.

Other scientists have expressed doubt whether these structures really exist.

== List of LQGs ==
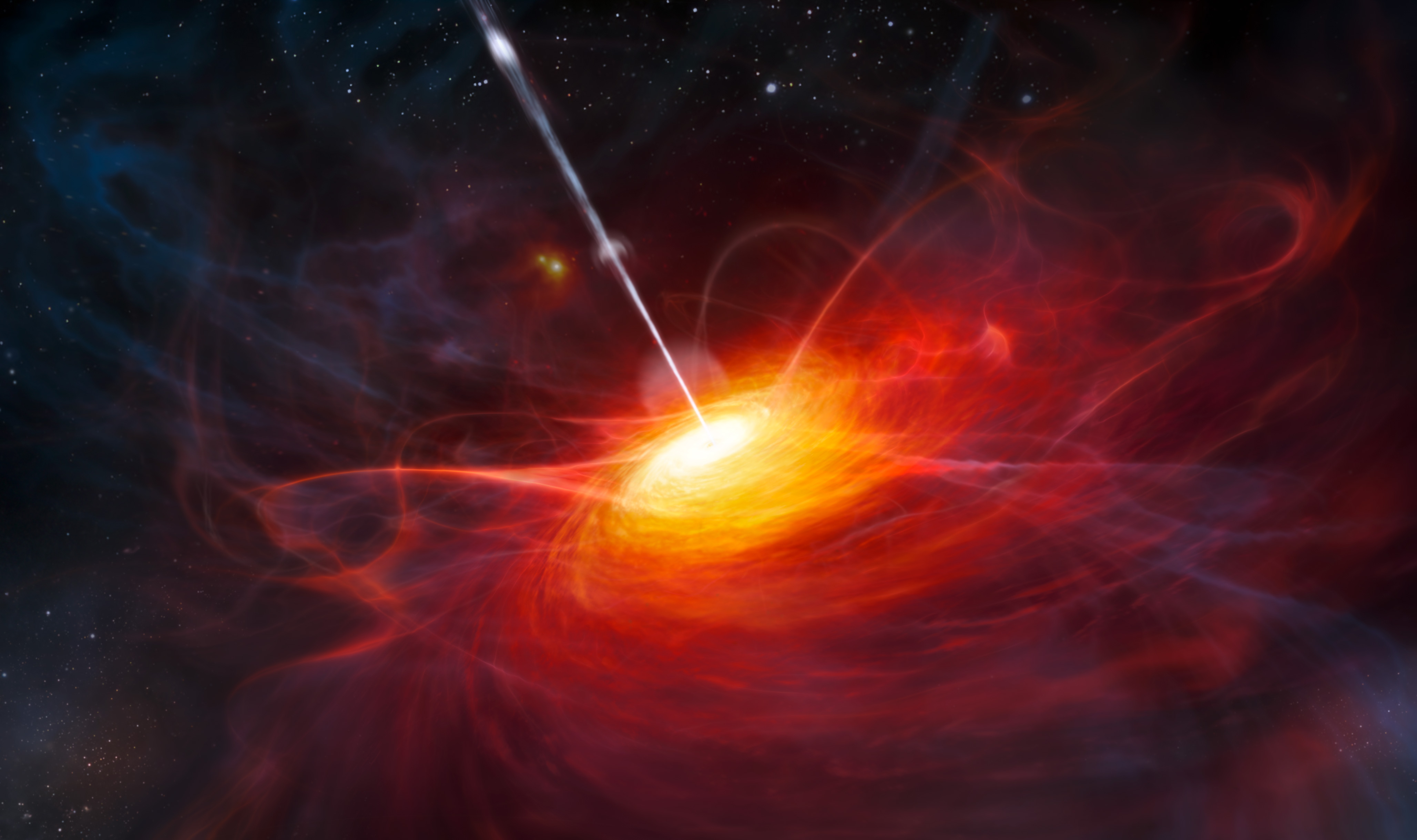
An artist's impression of a single quasar powered by a black hole with a mass two billion times that of the Sun

Redshift, represented by "z," is a fundamental concept in astrophysics. It measures how much the light from celestial objects shift as they move away from Earth. A higher redshift value means the object is farther away in the universe.

Large Quasar Groups
LQG	Date	Mean Distance	Dimension	# of quasars	Notes
Webster LQG (LQG 1)	1982	z=0.37	100 Mpc	5	First LQG discovered. At the time of its discovery, it was the largest structure known.
Crampton–Cowley–Hartwick LQG (LQG 2, CCH LQG, Komberg-Kravtsov-Lukash LQG 10)	1987	z=1.11	60 Mpc	28	Second LQG discovered
Clowes–Campusano LQG (U1.28, CCLQG, LQG 3)	1991	z=1.28	longest dimension: 630 Mpc	34	Third LQG discovered
U1.90	1995	z=1.9	120 Mpc/h	10	Discovered by Graham, Clowes, Campusano.
7Sf Group (U0.19)	1995	z=0.19	60 Mpc/h	7	Discovered by Graham, Clowes, Campusano; this is a grouping of 7 Seyfert galaxies.
Komberg–Kravtsov–Lukash LQG 1	1996	z=0.6	R=96 Mpc/h	12	Discovered by Komberg, Kravtsov, Lukash.
Komberg–Kravtsov–Lukash LQG 2	1996	z=0.6	R=111 Mpc/h	12	Discovered by Komberg, Kravtsov, Lukash.
Komberg–Kravtsov–Lukash LQG 3	1996	z=1.3	R=123 Mpc/h	14	Discovered by Komberg, Kravtsov, Lukash.
Komberg–Kravtsov–Lukash LQG 4	1996	z=1.9	R=104 Mpc/h	14	Discovered by Komberg, Kravtsov, Lukash.
Komberg–Kravtsov–Lukash LQG 5	1996	z=1.7	R=146 Mpc/h	13	Discovered by Komberg, Kravtsov, Lukash.
Komberg–Kravtsov–Lukash LQG 6	1996	z=1.5	R=94 Mpc/h	10	Discovered by Komberg, Kravtsov, Lukash.
Komberg–Kravtsov–Lukash LQG 7	1996	z=1.9	R=92 Mpc/h	10	Discovered by Komberg, Kravtsov, Lukash.
Komberg–Kravtsov–Lukash LQG 8	1996	z=2.1	R=104 Mpc/h	12	Discovered by Komberg, Kravtsov, Lukash.
Komberg–Kravtsov–Lukash LQG 9	1996	z=1.9	R=66 Mpc/h	18	Discovered by Komberg, Kravtsov, Lukash.
Komberg–Kravtsov–Lukash LQG 11	1996	z=0.7	R=157 Mpc/h	11	Discovered by Komberg, Kravtsov, Lukash.
Komberg–Kravtsov–Lukash LQG 12	1996	z=1.2	R=155 Mpc/h	14	Discovered by Komberg, Kravtsov, Lukash.
Newman LQG (U1.54)	1998	z=1.54	150 Mpc/h	21	Discovered by P.R. Newman et al. This structure is parallel to the CCLQG, with its discovery, suggesting that the cellular structure of sheets and voids already existed in this era, as found in later void bubbles and walls of galaxies.,
Tesch–Engels LQG	2000	z=0.271	140 Mpc/h	7	The first X-ray selected LQG.
U1.11	2011	z=1.11	longest dimension: 780 Mpc	38	
Huge-LQG (U1.27)	2013	z=1.27	characteristic size: 500 Mpc; longest dimension: 1240 Mpc	73	The largest structure known in the observable universe until it was eclipsed by the Hercules–Corona Borealis Great Wall found one year later.

== See also ==
- List of largest cosmic structures
- Large-scale structure of the cosmos
