= List of largest cosmic structures =

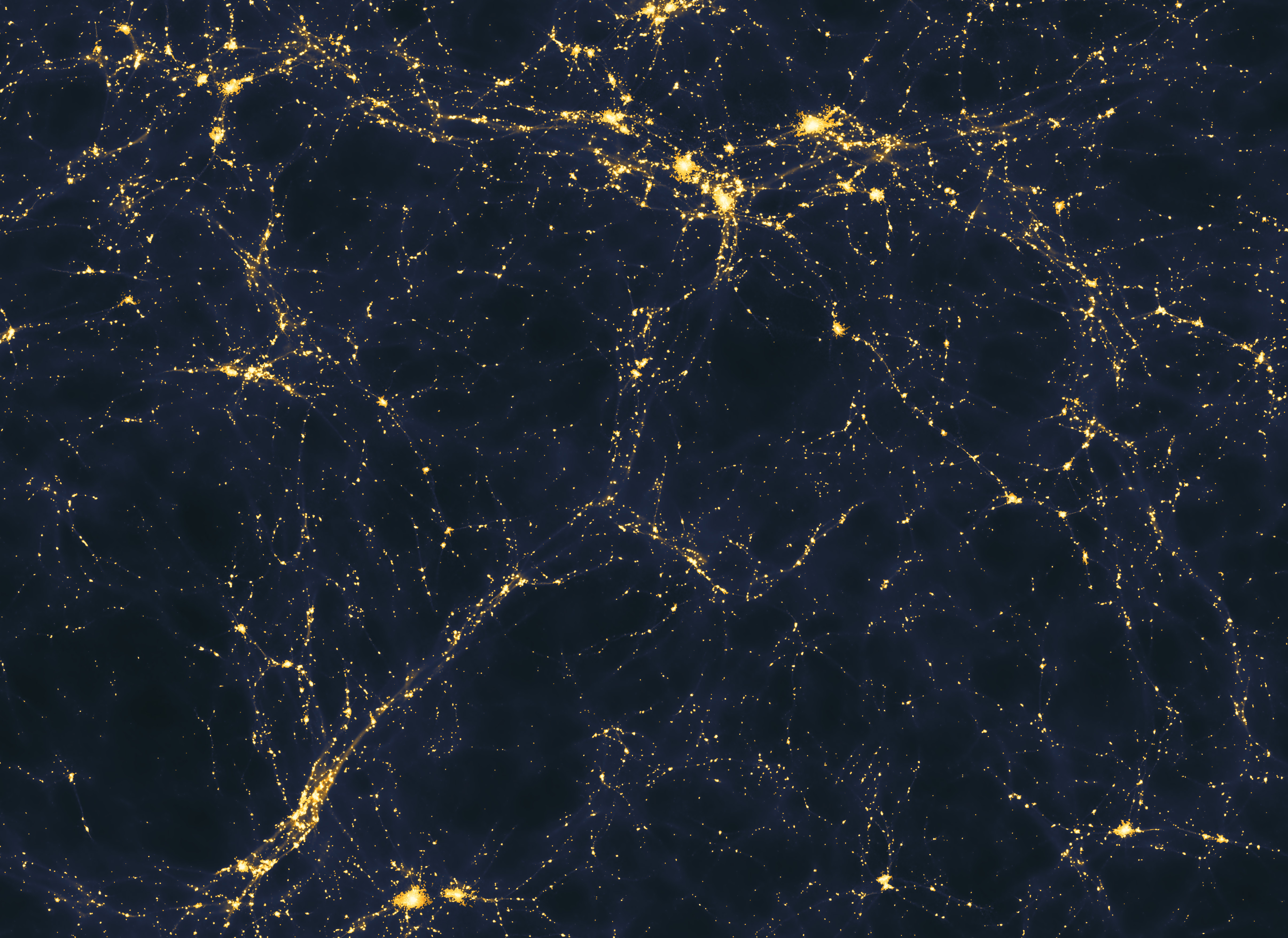
Galaxy filaments form massive, thread-like structures on the order of millions of light-years. Computer simulation.

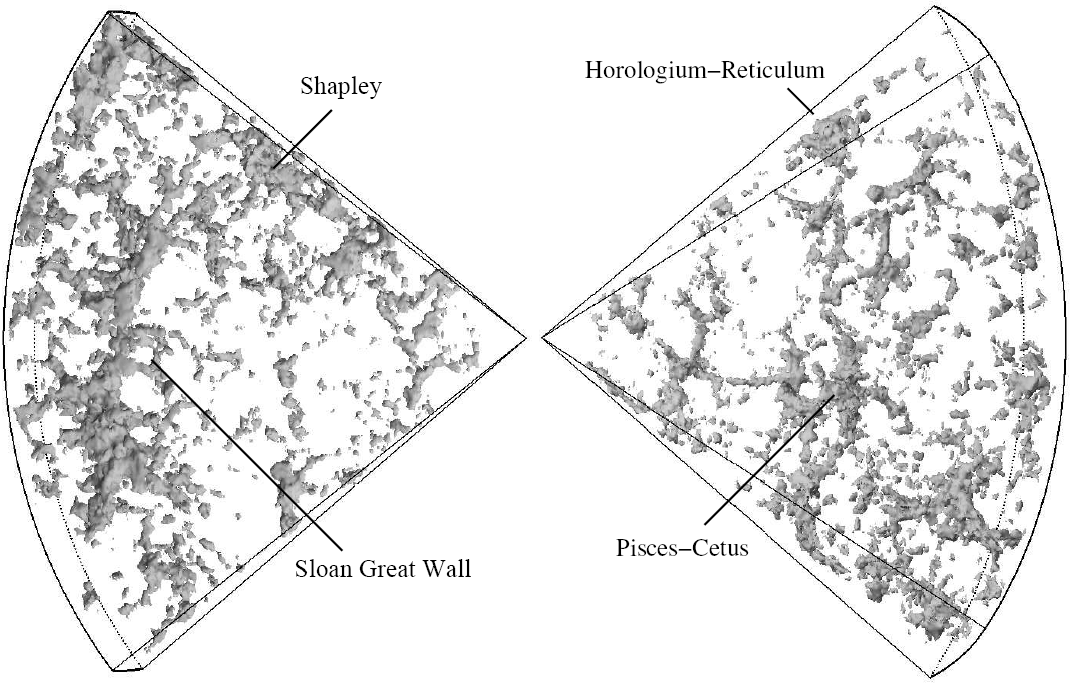
The Sloan Great Wall, the Pisces–Cetus Supercluster Complex, the Horologium-Reticulum Supercluster and the Shapley Supercluster as seen in the 2dF Galaxy Redshift Survey

This is a list of the largest cosmic structures so far discovered. The unit of measurement used is the light-year (distance traveled by light in one Julian year; approximately 9.46 trillion kilometres).

This list includes superclusters, galaxy filaments and large quasar groups (LQGs). The structures are listed based on their longest dimension.

This list refers only to coupling of matter with defined limits, and not the coupling of matter in general (such as, for example, the cosmic microwave background, which fills the entire universe). All structures in this list are defined as to whether their presiding limits have been identified.

There are some reasons to be cautious about this list:

- The Zone of Avoidance, or the part of the sky occupied by the Milky Way, blocks out light from several structures, making their limits imprecisely identified.
- Some structures are too distant to be seen even with the most powerful telescopes.
- Some structures have no defined limits, or endpoints. All structures are believed to be part of the cosmic web. Many structures are overlapped by nearby galaxies, creating a problem of how to carefully define the structure's limit.
- Interpreting the observational data requires assumptions about gravitational lensing, redshift, etc.

== List of largest structures ==
List of the largest cosmic structures
Structure name (year discovered)	Maximum dimension (in light-years)	Notes
Hercules–Corona Borealis Great Wall (2014)	15,000,000,000–10,000,000,000–9,700,000,000	Discovered through gamma-ray burst mapping. Existence as a structure is disputed.
Giant GRB Ring (2015)	5,600,000,000	Discovered through gamma-ray burst mapping. Largest-known regular formation in the observable universe.
Huge-LQG (2012–2013)	4,000,000,000	Decoupling of 73 quasars. Largest-known large quasar group and the first structure found to exceed 3 billion light-years.
Giant Arc (2021)	3,300,000,000	Located 9.2 billion light years away.
U1.11 LQG (2011)	2,500,000,000	Involves 38 quasars. Adjacent to the Clowes-Campusano LQG.
Clowes–Campusano LQG (1991)	2,000,000,000	Grouping of 34 quasars. Discovered by Roger Clowes and Luis Campusano.
Quipu (2025)	1,400,000,000	Named after a Andean recordkeeping system, adjacent to where it was discovered. It has a long spine-like shape, branching with clusters. It is widely regarded as one of the largest superstructures, but it is disputed whether it is a superstructure or supercluster.
Sloan Great Wall (2003)	1,380,000,000	Discovered through the 2dF Galaxy Redshift Survey and the Sloan Digital Sky Survey.
South Pole Wall (2020)	1,370,000,000	The largest contiguous feature in the local volume and comparable to the Sloan Great Wall (see above) at half the distance. It is located at the celestial South Pole.
King Ghidorah Supercluster (2022)	1,300,000,000	Consists of at least 15 clusters plus other interconnected filaments. It is the most massive galaxy supercluster discovered so far.
Big Ring (2024)	1,300,000,000	Made up of galaxy clusters.
(Traditional theoretical limit)	1,200,000,000	Structures larger than this size are usually considered incompatible with the cosmological principle. However, whether the existence of these structures itself constitutes a refutation of the cosmological principle is still unclear. Other studies have found that larger structures appear in simulations as well.
Ho'oleilana Bubble (2023)	1,000,000,000	Contains about 56,000 galaxies, located 820 million light years away.
BOSS Great Wall (BGW) (2016)	1,000,000,000	Structure consisting of 4 superclusters of galaxies. The mass and volume exceeds the amount of the Sloan Great Wall.
Perseus–Pegasus Filament (1985)	1,000,000,000	This galaxy filament contains the Perseus–Pisces Supercluster.
Pisces–Cetus Supercluster Complex (1987)	1,000,000,000	Contains the Milky Way, and is the first galaxy filament to be discovered. (The first LQG was found earlier in 1982.) A new report in 2014 confirms the Milky Way as a member of the Laniakea Supercluster.
CfA2 Great Wall (1989)	750,000,000	Also known as the Coma Wall.
Saraswati Supercluster	652,000,000	The Saraswati Supercluster consists of 43 massive galaxy clusters, which include Abell 2361 and ZWCl 2341.1+0000.
Boötes Supercluster	620,000,000	
Horologium-Reticulum Supercluster (2005)	550,000,000	Also known as the Horologium Supercluster.
Laniakea Supercluster (2014)	520,000,000	Galaxy supercluster in which Earth is located.
Komberg–Kravtsov–Lukash LQG 11	500,000,000	Discovered by Boris V. Komberg, Andrey V. Kravstov and Vladimir N. Lukash.
Hyperion proto-supercluster (2018)	489,000,000	The largest and earliest known proto– supercluster.
Komberg–Kravtsov–Lukash LQG 12	480,000,000	Discovered by Boris V. Komberg, Andrey V. Kravstov and Vladimir N. Lukash.
Newman LQG (U1.54)	450,000,000	Discovered Peter R Newman et al.
Komberg–Kravtsov–Lukash LQG 5	430,000,000	Discovered by Boris V. Komberg, Andrey V. Kravstov and Vladimir N. Lukash.
Tesch–Engels LQG	420,000,000	The first LGQ to be discovered with lasers and rays.
Shapley Supercluster	400,000,000	First identified by Harlow Shapley as a cloud of galaxies in 1930, it was not identified as a structure until 1989.
Komberg–Kravstov–Lukash LQG 3	390,000,000	Discovered by Boris V. Komberg, Andrey V. Kravstov and Vladimir N. Lukash.
U1.90	380,000,000	
Lynx–Ursa Major Filament (LUM Filament)	370,000,000	
Sculptor Wall	370,000,000	Also known as the Southern Great Wall.
Einasto Supercluster	360,000,000	
Pisces-Cetus Supercluster	350,000,000	
Komberg–Kravtsov–Lukash LQG 2	350,000,000	Discovered by Boris V. Komberg, Andrey V. Kravstov and Vladimir N. Lukash.
z=2.38 filament around protocluster ClG J2143-4423	330,000,000	
Webster LQG	320,000,000	First LQG (Large Quasar Group) discovered.
Komberg–Kravtsov–Lukash LQG 8	310,000,000	Discovered by Boris V. Komberg, Andrey V. Kravstov and Vladimir N. Lukash.
Komberg–Kravtsov–Lukash LQG 1	280,000,000	Discovered by Boris V. Komberg, Andrey V. Kravstov and Vladimir N. Lukash.
Komberg–Kravtsov–Lukash LQG 6	260,000,000	Discovered by Boris V. Komberg, Andrey V. Kravstov and Vladimir N. Lukash.
Komberg–Kravtsov–Lukash LQG 7	250,000,000	Discovered by Boris V. Komberg, Andrey V. Kravstov and Vladimir N. Lukash.
SCL @ 1338+27	228,314,341	One of the most distant known superclusters.
Pavo–Indus Supercluster	215,000,000	Contains the Pavo Cluster, a key gravitational anchor.
Komberg–Kravtsov–Lukash LQG 9	200,000,000	Discovered by Boris V. Komberg, Andrey V. Kravstov and Vladimir N. Lukash.
SSA22 Protocluster	200,000,000	Giant collection of Lyman-alpha blobs.
Ursa Major Supercluster	200,000,000	
Komberg-Kravtsov-Lukash LQG 10	180,000,000	Discovered by Boris V. Komberg, Andrey V. Kravstov and Vladimir N. Lukash.
Telescopium−Grus Cloud	163,812,936	A large low-density filament, containing 24 Galaxy clusters.
Hydra–Centaurus Supercluster	150,000,000	It contains the Hydra Cluster, which has high proportions of Dark Matter, whereas the Centaurus Supercluster is a extremely rich.
Southern Supercluster	134,000,000	It extends from the constellation Cetus to Dorado.
Virgo Supercluster	110,000,000	A part of the Laniakea Supercluster (see above). It also contains the Milky Way Galaxy, which contains the Solar System where Earth orbits the Sun. Listed here for reference.
Southern Supercluster Strand	102,000,000	A filament, part of the Southern Supercluster, connecting it to the Telescopium-Grus Cloud.
Hydra Supercluster	100,000,000	A elongated supercluster, residing in the Hydra–Centaurus Supercluster, it is one of the closest superclusters to Virgo Supercluster (see above).

Comparison of the largest cosmic voids

== List of largest voids ==
Voids are immense spaces between galaxy filaments and other large-scale structures. Technically they are not structures. They are vast spaces which contain very few or no galaxies. They are theorized to be caused by quantum fluctuations during the early formation of the universe.

A list of the largest voids so far discovered is below. Each is ranked according to its longest dimension.

List of the largest voids
Void name/designation	Maximum dimension (in light-years)	Notes
LOWZ North 13788 void	2,953,000,000	One of largest known voids, containing 109,066 known galaxies.
KBC Void (Local Hole)	2,000,000,000	Proposed void containing the Milky Way galaxy and Local Group as an explanation for the discrepancy in the Hubble constant. Existence is still disputed.
LOWZ North 4739 void	1,846,000,000	
LOWZ North 16634 void	1,671,000,000	
LOWZ North 11627 void	1,663,000,000	
LOWZ South 4653 void	1,610,000,000	
LOWZ North 13222 void	1,515,000,000	
Giant Void	1,300,000,000	Also known as Canes Venatici Supervoid
LOWZ North 14348 void	1,277,000,000	
LOWZ South 5589 void	1,110,000,000	
LOWZ North 13721 void	1,095,000,000	
LOWZ North 11918 void	998,000,000	
LOWZ North 5692 void	984,000,000	
Bahcall & Soneira 1982 void	978,000,000	This suspected void ranged 100 degrees across the sky, and has shown up on other surveys as several separate voids.
LOWZ North 11446 void	944,000,000	
LOWZ North 15734 void	938,000,000	
LOWZ North 16394 void	934,000,000	
LOWZ North 8541 void	917,000,000	
LOWZ South 4775 void	899,000,000	
LOWZ North 12092 void	891,000,000	
LOWZ North 3294 void	887,000,000	
Tully-11 void	880,000,000	Catalogued by R. Brent Tully
CMASS South 7225 void	865,000,000	
LOWZ North 14775 void	848,000,000	
LOWZ South 6334 void	846,000,000	
LOWZ North 10254 void	843,000,000	
LOWZ North 13568 void	841,000,000	
LOWZ North 11954 void	827,000,000	
LOWZ North 3404 void	812,000,000	
LOWZ South 3713 void	805,000,000	
LOWZ South 4325 void	804,000,000	
CMASS South 5582 void	796,000,000	
Tully-10 void	792,000,000	Catalogued by R. Brent Tully
LOWZ North 6177 void	789,000,000	
Tully-9 void	746,000,000	Catalogued by R. Brent Tully
B&B Abell-20 void	684,000,000	
B&B Abell-9 void	652,000,000	
Tully-7 void	567,240,000	Catalogued by R. Brent Tully
Tully-4 void	564,000,000	Catalogued by R. Brent Tully
Tully-6 void	557,460,000	Catalogued by R. Brent Tully
Tully-8 void	554,200,000	Catalogued by R. Brent Tully
B&B Abell-21 void	521,600,000	
B&B Abell-28 void	521,600,000	
Eridanus Supervoid (CMB Cold Spot)	489,000,000 (most likely value)	A recent analysis of the Wilkinson Microwave Anisotropy Probe (WMAP) in 2007 has found an irregularity of the temperature fluctuation of the cosmic microwave background within the vicinity of the constellation Eridanus with analysis found to be 70 microkelvins cooler than the average CMB temperature. One speculation is that a void could cause the cold spot, with the possible size on the left. However, it may be as large as 1 billion light-years, close to the size of the Giant Void.
B&B Abell-4 void	489,000,000	
B&B Abell-15 void	489,000,000	
Tully-3 void	489,000,000	Catalogued by R. Brent Tully
1994EEDTAWSS-10 void	469,440,000	
Tully-1 void	456,400,000	Catalogued by R. Brent Tully
B&B Abell-8 void	456,000,000	
B&B Abell-22 void	456,000,000	
Tully-2 void	443,360,000	Catalogued by R. Brent Tully
B&B Abell-24 void	423,800,000	
B&B Abell-27 void	423,800,000	
CMASS North 4407 void	414,000,000	
B&B Abell-7 void	391,200,000	
B&B Abell-12 void	391,200,000	
B&B Abell-29 void	391,200,000	
1994EEDTAWSS-21 void	378,160,000	
Southern Local Supervoid	365,120,000	
B&B Abell-10 void	358,600,000	
B&B Abell-11 void	358,600,000	
B&B Abell-13 void	358,600,000	
B&B Abell-17 void	358,600,000	
B&B Abell-19 void	358,600,000	
B&B Abell-23 void	358,600,000	
CMASS North 11496 void	342,000,000	
1994EEDTAWSS-19 void	342,100,000	
Northern Local Supervoid	339,000,000	Virgo Supercluster, Coma Supercluster, Perseus–Pisces Supercluster, Ursa Major-Lynx Supercluster, Hydra–Centaurus Supercluster, Sculptor Supercluster, Pavo–Corona Australis Supercluster form a sheet between the Northern Local Supervoid and the Southern Local Supervoid. The Hercules Supercluster separates the Northern Local Void from the Boötes Void. The Perseus-Pisces Supercluster and Pegasus Supercluster form a sheet separate the Northern Local Void and Southern Local Void from the Pegasus Void.
Boötes Void	330,000,000	Also known as The Giant Nothing
1994EEDTAWSS-12 void	328,000,000	
CMASS North 15935 void	252,000,000	
SSRS1 4 void	217,000,000	
GACIRASS V0 void	215,000,000	
CMASS North 60 void	210,000,000	
SSRS2 3 void	198,000,000	
Local Void	195,000,000	The nearest void to the Milky Way.
SSRS2 1 void	177,000,000	
IRAS 1 void	166,000,000	
Sculptor void	163,000,000	
IRAS 3 void	145,000,000	
IRAS 2 void	142,000,000	
IRAS 7 void	141,000,000	
SSRS2 11 void	139,000,000	
IRAS 6 void	135,000,000	
IRAS 13 void	131,000,000	
Pegasus Void	130,000,000	The Perseus–Pisces Supercluster and Pegasus Supercluster form a sheet separate the Northern Local Void and Southern Local Void from the Pegasus Void.
IRAS 8 void	128,000,000	
SSRS2 9 void	127,000,000	
IRAS 9 void	117,000,000	
IRAS 5 void	117,000,000	
SSRS2 4 void	116,000,000	
SSRS2 10 void	113,000,000	
SSRS1 1 void	108,000,000	Located just behind the galaxy concentration Eridanus-Fornax-Dorado.
IRAS 11 void	104,000,000	
SSRS2 6 void	104,000,000	
CMASS North 10020 void	104,000,000	
IRAS 12 void	102,000,000	
Perseus-Pisces void	99,000,000	
SSRS1 2 void	97,000,000	
IRAS 14 void	93,000,000	
SSRS2 8 void	90,000,000	
SSRS2 15 void	89,000,000	
GACIRASS V1 void	83,000,000	
SSRS2 7 void	83,000,000	
SSRS2 12 void	81,000,000	
GACIRASS V3 void	81,000,000	
SSRS2 14 void	69,000,000	
SSRS2 18 void	68,000,000	
SSRS2 16 void	66,000,000	
GACIRASS V2 void	63,000,000	
SSRS2 17 void	61,000,000	

== See also ==
- Lists of astronomical objects
- List of large quasar groups
- List of largest galaxies
- List of largest nebulae
- List of largest stars and List of most massive stars
- List of largest exoplanets
- List of most massive black holes
- List of superclusters
- List of voids
- Timeline of knowledge about galaxies, clusters of galaxies, and large-scale structure
- Large-scale structure of the universe
