= Supercluster =

Large group of smaller galaxy clusters or galaxy groups

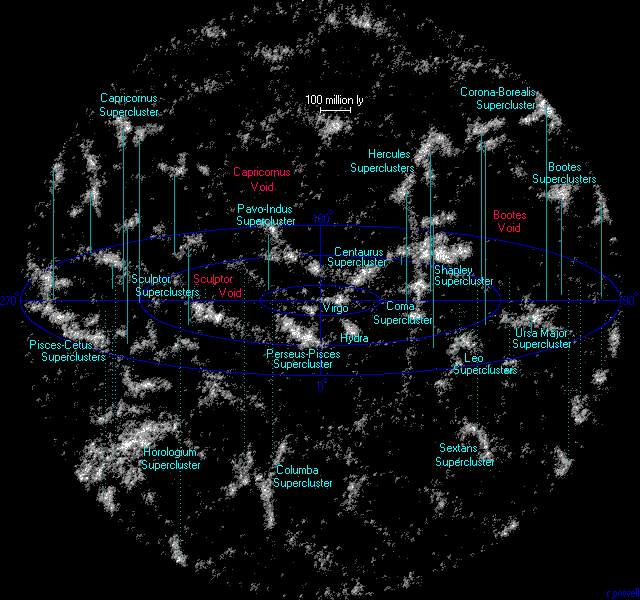
A map of the superclusters and voids nearest to Earth

A supercluster is a large group of smaller galaxy clusters or galaxy groups; they are among the largest known structures in the universe. The Milky Way is part of the Local Group (containing more than 54 galaxies), part of the Laniakea Supercluster, contained within the larger Pisces–Cetus Supercluster Complex.

The large size and low density of superclusters means that most of them, unlike clusters, expand with the Hubble expansion. The number of superclusters in the observable universe is estimated to be 10 million.

== Existence ==
The existence of superclusters indicates that the galaxies in the Universe are not uniformly distributed; most of them are clumped in groups and clusters, with groups containing up to some dozens of galaxies and clusters up to several thousand galaxies. Those groups and clusters and additional isolated galaxies in turn form even larger structures called superclusters.

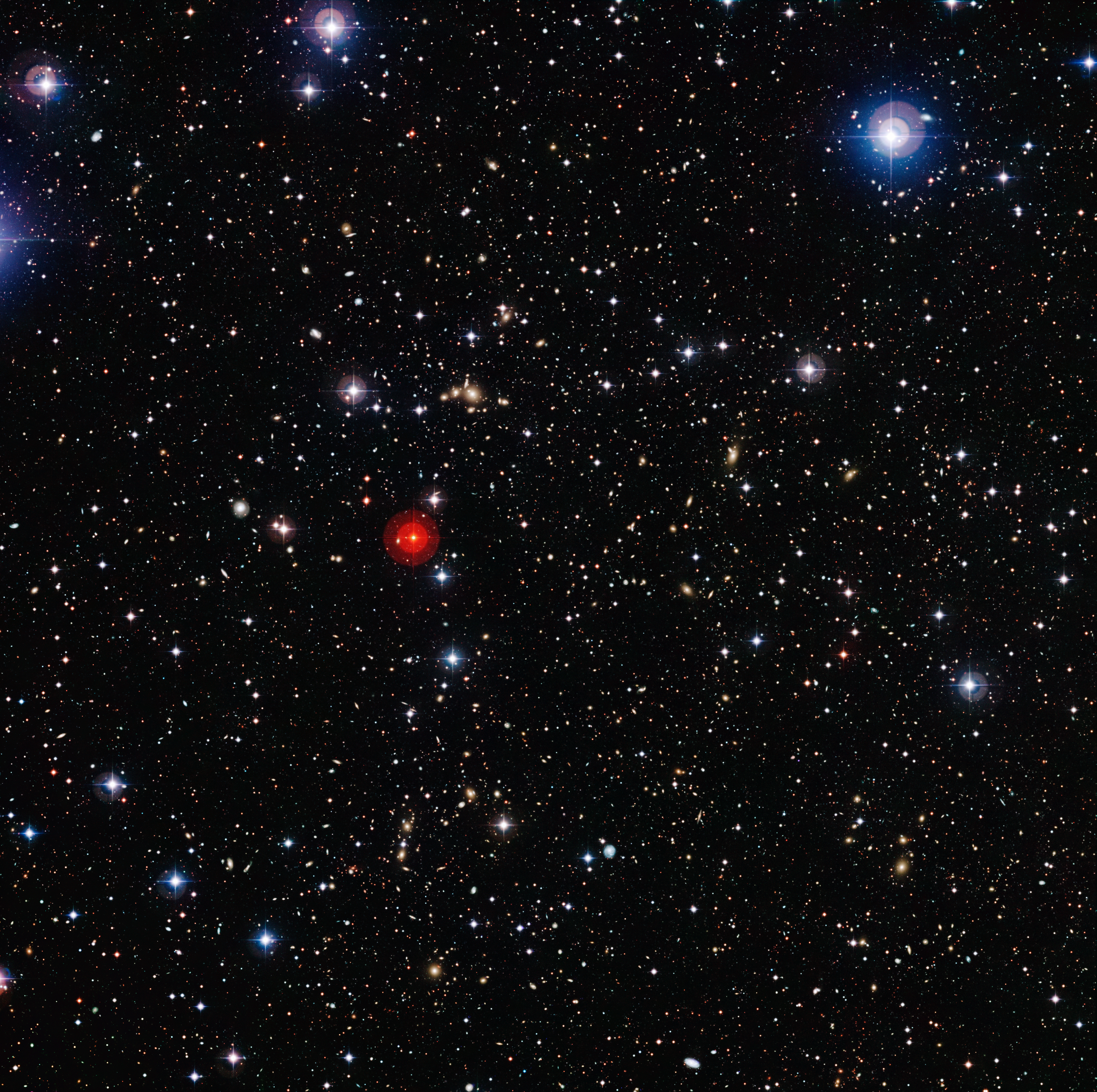
The Abell 901/902 supercluster is located a little over two billion light-years from Earth.

Their existence was first postulated by George Abell in his 1958 Abell catalogue of galaxy clusters. He called them "second-order clusters", or clusters of clusters. They have been also called extensions or concentrations.

Superclusters form massive structures of galaxies, called "filaments", "supercluster complexes", "hyperclusters", "chains", "strands", "superstructures", "walls" or "sheets", that may span between several hundred million light-years to 10 billion light-years, covering more than 5% of the observable universe. These are the largest structures known to date. Observations of superclusters can give information about the initial conditions of the universe, when these superclusters were created. The directions of the rotational axes of galaxies within superclusters are studied, potentially giving insight and information into the early formation process of galaxies in the history of the Universe.

Superclusters are supposed to be the largest structures in the Universe, following the cosmological principle, but even larger structures have been observed in surveys, including the Sloan Great Wall. At these large scales, it is difficult to distinguish these features from multiple superclusters in chance alignment, however.

== List of superclusters ==
Galaxy supercluster	Data	Notes
Einasto Supercluster	z = ~0.25 (3 billion light years ); Length = 360 million light years; Mass = 2.6 × 10^{16} solar masses	Discovered in 2023 by analyzing Sloan Digital Sky Survey images. Claimed to be the most massive galaxy supercluster discovered so far.
King Ghidorah Supercluster	z = 0.50-0.64; Mass = 1 × 10^{16} solar masses	The most massive galaxy supercluster discovered until 2023.
Laniakea Supercluster	z = 0.000; Length = 153 Mpc (500 million light-years)	The Laniakea Supercluster is the supercluster that contains the Virgo Cluster, Local Group, and by extension on the latter, our galaxy; the Milky Way.
Virgo Supercluster	z= 0.000; Length = 33 Mpc (110 million light-years)	It contains the Local Group with our galaxy, the Milky Way. It also contains the Virgo Cluster near its center, and is sometimes called the Local Supercluster. It is thought to contain over 47,000 galaxies. A 2014 study indicates that the Virgo Supercluster is only a lobe of an even greater supercluster, Laniakea.
Hydra–Centaurus Supercluster		SCl 128 - It is composed of two lobes, sometimes also referred to as superclusters, or sometimes the entire supercluster is referred to by these other two names: Hydra Supercluster; Centaurus Supercluster; In 2014, the newly announced Laniakea Supercluster subsumed the Hydra-Centaurus Supercluster, which became a component of the new supercluster.
Pavo–Indus Supercluster		In 2014, the newly announced Laniakea Supercluster subsumed the Pavo-Indus Supercluster, which became a component of the new supercluster.
Southern Supercluster		Includes Fornax Cluster (S373), Dorado and Eridanus clouds.
Saraswati Supercluster	Distance = 4 billion light years (1.2 Gpc) Length = 652 Million light-years	The Saraswati Supercluster consists of 43 massive galaxy clusters such as Abell 2361 and has a mass of about 2 × 10^{16} M_{☉} and is seen in the Pisces constellation

=== Nearby superclusters ===
Galaxy supercluster	Data	Notes
Perseus–Pisces Supercluster		SCl 40
Coma Supercluster		SCl 117 - Forms most of the CfA Homunculus, the center of the CfA2 Great Wall galaxy filament
Sculptor Superclusters		SCl 9
Hercules Superclusters		SCl 160
Leo Supercluster		SCl 93
Ophiuchus Supercluster	17^{h} 10^{m} −22°; cz=8500–9000 km/s (centre); 18 Mpc × 26 Mpc	(no SCl number) - Forming the far wall of the Ophiuchus Void, it may be connected in a filament, with the Pavo-Indus-Telescopium Supercluster and the Hercules Supercluster. This supercluster is centered on the cD cluster Ophiuchus Cluster, and has at least two more galaxy clusters, four more galaxy groups, several field galaxies, as members.
Shapley Supercluster	z=0.046.(650 Mly away)	SCl 124 - The second supercluster found, after the Local Supercluster.

=== Distant superclusters ===
Galaxy supercluster	Data	Notes
Pisces–Cetus Supercluster		SCl 10
Boötes Supercluster		SCl 138
Horologium–Reticulum Supercluster	z=0.063 (700 Mly) Length = 550 Mly	SCl 48 + SCl 49
Corona Borealis Supercluster	z=0.07	SCl 158
Columba Supercluster		(no SCl number)
Aquarius Supercluster		SCl 4
Aquarius B Supercluster		SCl 193
Aquarius–Capricornus Supercluster		SCl 189
Aquarius–Cetus Supercluster		SCl 188
Bootes A Supercluster		SCl 150
Caelum Supercluster	z=0.126 (1.4 Gly)	SCl 59
Draco Supercluster		SCl 114
Draco–Ursa Major Supercluster		SCl 257
Fornax–Eridanus Supercluster		SCl 53
Grus Supercluster		SCl 197
Leo A Supercluster		SCl 100
Leo–Sextans Supercluster		SCl 91
Leo–Virgo Supercluster		SCl 107
Microscopium Supercluster		SCl 174
Pegasus–Pisces Supercluster		SCl 3
Perseus–Pisces Supercluster		SCl 40
Pisces–Aries Supercluster		SCl 30
Ursa Majoris Supercluster		SCl 109
Virgo-Coma Supercluster		SCl 111

=== Extremely distant superclusters ===
Galaxy supercluster	Data	Notes
COSMOS-z3.1-A	z=3.1	This large scale structure that is composed of 10 high density regions of galaxies can be described as a proto-supercluster.
Hyperion proto-supercluster	z=2.45	This supercluster at the time of its discovery in 2018 was the earliest and largest proto-supercluster found to date.
Lynx Supercluster	z=1.27	Discovered in 1999 (as ClG J0848+4453, a name now used to describe the western cluster, with ClG J0849+4452 being the eastern one), it contains at least two clusters RXJ 0848.9+4452 (z=1.26) and RXJ 0848.6+4453 (z=1.27) . At the time of discovery, it became the most distant known supercluster. Additionally, seven smaller groups of galaxies are associated with the supercluster.
SCL @ 1338+27 at z=1.1	z=1.1 Length=70Mpc	A rich supercluster with several galaxy clusters was discovered around an unusual concentration of 23 QSOs at z=1.1 in 2001. The size of the complex of clusters may indicate a wall of galaxies exists there, instead of a single supercluster. The size discovered approaches the size of the CfA2 Great Wall filament. At the time of the discovery, it was the largest and most distant supercluster beyond z=0.5
SCL @ 1604+43 at z=0.9	z=0.91	This supercluster at the time of its discovery was the largest supercluster found so deep into space, in 2000. It consisted of two known rich clusters and one newly discovered cluster as a result of the study that discovered it. The then known clusters were Cl 1604+4304 (z=0.897) and Cl 1604+4321 (z=0.924), which then known to have 21 and 42 known galaxies respectively. The then newly discovered cluster was located at 16^{h} 04^{m} 25.7^{s}, +43° 14′ 44.7″
SCL @ 0018+16 at z=0.54 in SA26	z=0.54	This supercluster lies around radio galaxy 54W084C (z=0.544) and is composed of at least three large clusters, CL 0016+16 (z=0.5455), RX J0018.3+1618 (z=0.5506), RX J0018.8+1602 .
MS 0302+17	z=0.42 Length=6Mpc	This supercluster has at least three member clusters, the eastern cluster CL 0303+1706, southern cluster MS 0302+1659 and northern cluster MS 0302+1717.

== Diagram ==
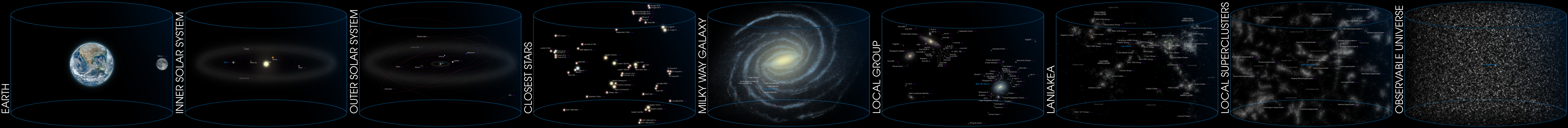
A diagram of Earth's location in the observable Universe and neighbouring superclusters of galaxies. (Alternative image.)

== See also ==
- Lists of astronomical objects
- List of largest cosmic structures
- Galaxy
- Galaxy groups and clusters
- Galaxy cluster
- Galaxy filament
- Galaxy group
- Illustris project
- Large-scale structure of the cosmos
