= List of stars in Indus =

This is the list of notable stars in the constellation Indus, sorted by decreasing brightness.

Name	B	Var	HD	HIP	RA	Dec	vis. mag.	abs. mag.	Dist. (ly)	Sp. class	Notes
α Ind	α		196171	101772	20^{h} 37^{m} 33.99^{s}	−47° 17′ 30.0″	3.11	0.65	101	K0III	Pe Sze, the Persian
β Ind	β		198700	103227	20^{h} 54^{m} 48.58^{s}	−58° 27′ 14.7″	3.67	−2.66	603	K0III	variable star, ΔV = 0.004^{m}, P = 1.83080 d
θ Ind	θ		202730	105319	21^{h} 19^{m} 51.88^{s}	−53° 26′ 57.4″	4.39	2.02	97	A5V	
δ Ind	δ		208450	108431	21^{h} 57^{m} 55.03^{s}	−54° 59′ 33.2″	4.40	0.63	185	F0IV	
η Ind	η		197157	102333	20^{h} 44^{m} 02.19^{s}	−51° 55′ 15.0″	4.51	2.59	79	A6:var	
ε Ind	ε		209100	108870	22^{h} 03^{m} 17.44^{s}	−56° 46′ 47.3″	4.69	6.89	12	K5V	one of the nearest known star systems; binary brown dwarf and cold Jovian planet companions
ζ Ind	ζ		198048	102790	20^{h} 49^{m} 28.93^{s}	−46° 13′ 36.8″	4.90	−0.57	404	K5III	
ι Ind	ι		198308	102950	20^{h} 51^{m} 30.05^{s}	−51° 36′ 29.4″	5.06	−1.14	567	K1II/III	
μ Ind	μ		200365	104085	21^{h} 05^{m} 14.23^{s}	−54° 43′ 37.0″	5.17	0.02	349	K2III	
ν Ind	ν		211998	110618	22^{h} 24^{m} 34.39^{s}	−72° 15′ 13.6″	5.28	2.98	94	A3V: + F9V	
ο Ind	ο		207241	107835	21^{h} 50^{m} 47.23^{s}	−69° 37′ 45.9″	5.52	−0.65	558	M0III	
HD 217831			217831	113969	23^{h} 04^{m} 52.15^{s}	−68° 49′ 13.4″	5.53	1.82	180	F4III	
HD 212728	χ (Note: Labelled Chi Indi (χ Ind/χ Indi) by Bode in his Uranographia)		212728	110935	22^{h} 28^{m} 37.44^{s}	−67° 29′ 20.0″	5.56	2.36	142	A3V	
HD 207229			207229	107773	21^{h} 50^{m} 00.13^{s}	−64° 42′ 44.8″	5.62	0.57	334	K1III	has a planet (b)
κ^{2} Ind	κ^{2}		209529	109081	22^{h} 05^{m} 50.95^{s}	−59° 38′ 09.4″	5.62	−0.37	514	K4III	
HD 202103			202103	104978	21^{h} 15^{m} 45.84^{s}	−53° 15′ 47.0″	5.73	0.30	397	A6IV	
HD 199623	ω (Note: Labelled Omega Indi (ω Ind/ω Indi) by Bode in his Uranographia)		199623	103673	21^{h} 00^{m} 21.56^{s}	−51° 15′ 56.3″	5.76	3.48	93	F5IV-V	
HD 212211			212211	110668	22^{h} 25^{m} 10.39^{s}	−70° 25′ 53.3″	5.78	2.26	165	F3III	
HD 207964	φ (Note: Labelled Phi Indi (φ Ind/φ Indi) by Bode in his Uranographia)		207964	108195	21^{h} 55^{m} 11.34^{s}	−61° 53′ 11.0″	5.92	2.58	152	F1III	
T Ind		T	202874	105334	21^{h} 20^{m} 09.48^{s}	−45° 01′ 18.8″	6.00	−2.63	1900	C	semiregular variable, V_{max} = 5.76^{m}, V_{min} = 6.47^{m}, P = 272 d
HD 206399			206399	107423	21^{h} 45^{m} 28.81^{s}	−71° 00′ 31.8″	6.02	−0.76	741	B8IV	
HD 208796			208796	108626	22^{h} 00^{m} 24.22^{s}	−55° 53′ 00.4″	6.02	−0.40	627	B9IV/V	
ρ Ind	ρ		216437	113137	22^{h} 54^{m} 39.56^{s}	−70° 04′ 26.0″	6.04	3.92	86	G4IV-V	has a planet (b)
γ Ind	γ		203760	105841	21^{h} 26^{m} 15.44^{s}	−54° 39′ 38.0″	6.10	2.08	208	F1III	
BG Ind	κ^{1}	BG	208496	108478	21^{h} 58^{m} 30.07^{s}	−59° 00′ 44.0″	6.13	2.02	217	F3V	Algol variable, V_{max} = 6.11^{m}, V_{min} = 6.36^{m}, P = 1.46406335 d
HD 219644			219644	115062	23^{h} 18^{m} 19.99^{s}	−67° 28′ 16.4″	6.15	−0.27	628	K2/K3III	
π Ind	π		208149	108281	21^{h} 56^{m} 14.04^{s}	−57° 53′ 58.6″	6.17	0.06	543	A3m...	
HD 218288			218288	114268	23^{h} 08^{m} 35.55^{s}	−73° 35′ 10.0″	6.18	−0.17	607	K3III	
HD 205877			205877	106978	21^{h} 39^{m} 59.74^{s}	−52° 21′ 32.5″	6.20	−0.23	631	F7III	suspected variable
HD 205417			205417	106818	21^{h} 38^{m} 02.80^{s}	−64° 49′ 26.9″	6.22	−0.07	591	A0/A1IV	
HD 198766			198766	103206	20^{h} 54^{m} 35.10^{s}	−50° 43′ 38.3″	6.23	−2.16	1552	B5IV	
HD 199642			199642	103693	21^{h} 00^{m} 43.41^{s}	−53° 44′ 20.5″	6.26	−0.70	805	K5/M0III	variable star, ΔV = 0.009^{m}, P = 0.08931 d
HD 203548			203548	105685	21^{h} 24^{m} 20.80^{s}	−46° 36′ 52.8″	6.30	1.38	314	A5m...	
HD 205935			205935	107030	21^{h} 40^{m} 33.69^{s}	−55° 44′ 16.8″	6.33	−0.31	694	K0III-IV	
HD 215729			215729	112694	22^{h} 49^{m} 17.45^{s}	−70° 20′ 53.0″	6.35	1.35	327	A2V	
HD 204228			204228	106065	21^{h} 29^{m} 00.08^{s}	−53° 42′ 21.1″	6.39	1.17	361	K2IIICN...	
HD 203010			203010	105425	21^{h} 21^{m} 16.60^{s}	−49° 56′ 16.3″	6.40	1.16	364	K3III	
HD 204873			204873	106419	21^{h} 33^{m} 17.62^{s}	−52° 44′ 15.9″	6.43	−0.71	872	K4III	
HD 200887			200887	104296	21^{h} 07^{m} 44.50^{s}	−45° 22′ 46.0″	6.45	1.57	308	A9V	
HD 206690			206690	107409	21^{h} 45^{m} 18.67^{s}	−49° 29′ 56.0″	6.46	0.93	417	K1III	
HD 218497	ψ (Note: Labelled Psi Indi (ψ Ind/ψ Indi) by Bode in his Uranographia)		218497	114367	23^{h} 09^{m} 44.73^{s}	−67° 52′ 34.2″	6.47	2.86	172	F3IV	
HD 218558			218558	114408	23^{h} 10^{m} 11.99^{s}	−66° 51′ 27.8″	6.47	2.50	203	K0IV	
HD 206429			206429	107299	21^{h} 43^{m} 59.16^{s}	−57° 19′ 30.4″	6.49	3.30	141	F7IV/V	
HD 208184			208184	108268	21^{h} 56^{m} 03.42^{s}	−52° 27′ 49.2″	6.50	0.09	623	G6III	
HD 207158	υ (Note: Labelled Upsilon Indi (υ Ind/υ Indi) by Bode in his Uranographia)		207158	107690	21^{h} 48^{m} 54.41^{s}	–56° 16′ 26.4″	6.55		666	B9V	
HD 201931	(σ) (Note: Labelled Sigma Microscopii (σ Mic/σ Microscopii) by Bode in his Uranographia)		201931	104838	21^{h} 14^{m} 16.67^{s}	–45° 46′ 57.2″	6.89		208	K1III	
HD 201933	σ (Note: Labelled Sigma Indi (σ Ind/σ Indi) by Bode in his Uranographia)		201933	104929	21^{h} 15^{m} 17.25^{s}	–58° 55′ 45.9″	6.93		493	G8III	
HD 203497	τ (Note: Labelled Tau Indi (τ Ind/τ Indi) by Bode in his Uranographia)		203497	105719	21^{h} 24^{m} 45.81^{s}	–57° 15′ 25.4″	7.18		740	A6/A7III/IV	
HD 206653		BC	206653	107525	21^{h} 46^{m} 37.91^{s}	−67° 35′ 46.8″	7.20		901	Ap...	α^{2} CVn variable, V_{max} = 7.18^{m}, V_{min} = 7.24^{m}, P = 1.788 d
HD 209295		CK	209295	108976	22^{h} 04^{m} 38.43^{s}	−64° 43′ 42.01″	7.32		381	A9/F0V	γ Dor and δ Sct variable, V_{max} = 7.25^{m}, V_{min} = 7.41^{m}, P = 0.88547 d
HD 208217		BD	208217	108340	21^{h} 56^{m} 56.69^{s}	−61° 50′ 46.3″	7.50		455	Ap...	α^{2} CVn variable, ΔV = 0.01^{m}
BS Ind		BS	202947	105404	21^{h} 20^{m} 59.80^{s}	−52° 28′ 40.1″	8.90		144.5	G9V	Algol variable, ΔV = 0.165^{m}, P = 0.435338 d
RS Ind		RS			21^{h} 36^{m} 49.74^{s}	−70° 20′ 00.8″	9.51			F4	Algol variable
V Ind		V	201484	104613	21^{h} 11^{m} 29.90^{s}	−45° 04′ 28.4″	10.01		2080	F0V	RR Lyr variable, V_{max} = 9.334^{m}, V_{min} = 10.439^{m}, P = 0.4796017 d
WASP-88					20^{h} 38^{m} 03.0^{s}	−47° 32′ 17″	10.4			F6	has a transiting planet (b)
WASP-73					21^{h} 19^{m} 48.0^{s}	−57° 51′ 04″	10.5			F9	has a transiting planet (b)
WASP-145 A					21^{h} 29^{m} 01.0^{s}	−58° 50′ 10″	11.5			K2V	has a transiting planet (b)
WASP-46					21^{h} 14^{m} 56.86^{s}	−55° 52′ 18.4″	12.90			G6V	has a transiting planet (b)
RX J2115-5840		CD			21^{h} 15^{m} 41.05^{s}	−58° 40′ 54.0″	16.0			WD+M5	AM Her variable, V_{max} = 16.0^{m}, V_{min} = 17.9^{m}, P = 0.077006 d
Table legend: • Name = Proper name • B = Bayer designation • F or/and G. = Flamsteed designation or Gould designation • Var = Variable star designation • HD = Henry Draper Catalogue designation number • HIP = Hipparcos Catalogue designation number • RA = Right ascension for the Epoch/Equinox J2000.0 • Dec = Declination for the Epoch/Equinox J2000.0 • vis. mag. = visual magnitude (m or m_{v}), also known as apparent magnitude • abs. mag. = absolute magnitude (M_{v}) • Dist. (ly) = Distance in light-years from Earth • Sp. class = Spectral class of the star in the stellar classification system • Notes = Common name(s) or alternate name(s); comments; notable properties [for example: multiple star status, range of variability if it is a variable star, exoplanets, etc.]

== See also ==
- List of stars by constellation
