= Indus in Chinese astronomy =

Constellation imperceptible from China

The modern constellation Indus is not included in the Three Enclosures and Twenty-Eight Mansions system of traditional Chinese uranography because its stars are too far south for observers in China to know about them prior to the introduction of Western star charts. Based on the work of Xu Guangqi and the German Jesuit missionary Johann Adam Schall von Bell in the late Ming Dynasty, this constellation has been classified as one of the 23 Southern Asterisms under the name "Persia" (波斯, Bōsī).

The name of the western constellation in modern Chinese means "the Indian constellation" (Chinese: 印第安座; pinyin: yìn dì ān zuò).

== Stars ==
The map of Chinese constellation in constellation Indus area consists of :

Asterisms	Translation	Western star name	Chinese star name	Romanization	Translation
波斯; Bōsī	Persia	α Ind	波斯二	Bōsīèr	2nd star
波斯; Bōsī	Persia	ζ Ind / HD 200249	波斯三	Bōsīsān	3rd star
波斯; Bōsī	Persia	θ Ind / γ Ind	波斯四	Bōsīsì	4th star
波斯; Bōsī	Persia	HD 205877 / HD 206427	波斯五	Bōsīwu	5th star
波斯; Bōsī	Persia	δ Ind	波斯六	Bōsīliù	6th star
波斯; Bōsī	Persia	ε Ind / HD 208796	波斯七	Bōsīqī	7th star
波斯; Bōsī	Persia	μ Ind	波斯八	Bōsībā	8th star
波斯; Bōsī	Persia	ι Ind	波斯九	Bōsījiǔ	9th star
波斯; Bōsī	Persia	HD 198766	波斯十	Bōsīshí	10th star
波斯; Bōsī	Persia	HD 199623	波斯十一	Bōsīshíyī	11th star
孔雀; Kǒngqiāo	Peacock	β Ind	孔雀增四	Kǒngqiāozēngsì	4th additional star

== See also ==
- Chinese astronomy
- Traditional Chinese star names
- Chinese constellations
