= List of star systems within 95–100 light-years =

This is a list of star systems within 95–100 light years of Earth.

== List ==
Key
#	Visible to the unaided eye
$	Bright star (absolute magnitude of +8.5 or brighter)
‡	White dwarf
§	Brown dwarf or sub-brown dwarf
*	Nearest in constellation

System	Star or (sub-) brown dwarf	Distance (ly)	Constellation	Coordinates: RA, Dec (Ep J2000, Eq J2000)	Stellar class	Apparent magnitude (V)	Parallax (mas)	Notes and additional references
HD 170368		95	Pavo		A7 V+			
Zeta Aquarii	A	95 ± 1	Aquarius	22^{h} 28^{m} 49.888^{s} -00° 01′ 11.87″	F3 V	4.42		
49 Librae	A	95.3 ± 0.5	Libra	16^{h} 00^{m} 19.61087^{s} -16° 32′ 00.5483″	F8 V	5.47		One of the closest type Ia supernova candidate to Earth.
49 Librae	B	95.3 ± 0.5	Libra	16^{h} 00^{m} 19.61087^{s} -16° 32′ 00.5483″	D			One of the closest type Ia supernova candidate to Earth.
HD 102195 (Flegetonte)		95.8 ± 0.2	Virgo	11^{h} 45^{m} 42.293^{s} +02° 49′ 17.326″	K0 V	8.07	34.056 ± 0.0555	Has one confirmed exoplanet (HD 102195 b/Lete).
GJ 3470 (Kaewkosin)		95.88 ± 0.07	Cancer	07^{h} 59^{m} 05.84^{s} +15° 23′ 29.236″	M2.0Ve	12.330	34.0172 ±0.0255	Has 1 exoplanet.
8 Draconis (Taiyi)		95.9 ± 0.3	Draco	12^{h} 55^{m} 28.55^{s} +65° 26′ 18.508″	F1VmA7(n)	5.225	34.0276 ± 0.0922	
WD 0145+234‡		95.98 ± 0.07	Aries	01^{h} 47^{m} 54.82^{s} +23° 39′ 43.6″	DA 3.9	14.014	33.9807 ± 0.0249	
38 Geminorum A		96 ± 2	Gemini	06^{h} 54^{m} 38.635^{s} +13° 10′ 40.221″	A8V	4.75 + 7.80	33.9184 ± 0.8248	
Iota Bootis (Asellus Secundus)		96.3 ± 0.2	Boötes	14^{h} 16^{m} 09.930^{s} +51° 22′ 02.029″	A7 V	4.75		
Beta Ceti (Diphda)$		96.3±0.5	Cetus	00^{h} 43^{m} 35.37090^{s} -17° 59′ 11.7827″	K0 III	2.02#		
GJ 9827		96.71 ± 0.05	Pisces	23^{h} 27^{m} 04.8376^{s} -01° 17′ 10.5827″	K6 V	10.250		Has 3 exoplanets.
Alpheratz (Alpha Andromedae)	A$	97 ± 1	Andromeda	00^{h} 08^{m} 23.25988^{s} +29° 05′ 25.5520″	B8IV-VHgMn	2.22#	33.62±0.35	54th brightest star and brightest known mercury–manganese star
Alpheratz (Alpha Andromedae)	B	97 ± 1	Andromeda	00^{h} 08^{m} 23.25988^{s} +29° 05′ 25.5520″	A7V	4.21	33.62±0.35	54th brightest star and brightest known mercury–manganese star
Beta Reticuli		97 ± 2	Reticulum	03^{h} 44^{m} 11.97587^{s} -64° 48′ 24.8610″	K0IV SB	3.84		
Alpha Pictoris$		97 ± 5	Pictor	06^{h} 48^{m} 11.45512^{s} -61° 56′ 29.0008″	A8 Vn kA6	3.27#		
HD 52265 (Citalá)		97.58 ± 0.07	Monoceros	07^{h} 00^{m} 18.036^{s} -05° 22′ 01.78″	G0 V	6.29		
Delta Draconis (Altais)$		97.8 ± 0.5	Draco	19^{h} 12^{m} 33.30137^{s} +67° 39′ 41.5392″	G9III	3.07#		
38 Geminorum B		97.9 ± 0.2	Gemini	06^{h} 54^{m} 38.63478^{s} +13° 10′ 40.2207″	G6V	4.75 + 7.80		
Alpha Indi$		98.3±0.5	Indus	20^{h} 37^{m} 34.032^{s} -47° 17′ 29.41″	K0III-IV	3.11#		
Nu¹ Draconis (Kuma)		98.7 ± 0.4	Draco	17^{h} 32^{m} 10.56856^{s} +55° 11′ 03.2739″	A8Vm	+4.88		
WISEP J232519.54-410534.9§		98.79	Sculptor		T9pec			
Theta Indi	A	99 ± 1	Indus	21^{h} 19^{m} 51.98955^{s} -53° 26′ 57.9315″	A5IV-V	4.40		
Theta Indi	B	99 ± 1	Indus	21^{h} 19^{m} 51.98955^{s} -53° 26′ 57.9315″	A5IV-V			
Lambda Bootis (Xuange)		99.0 ± 0.5	Boötes	14^{h} 16^{m} 23.018^{s} +46° 05′ 17.90″	A0p λB	+4.18		
KZ Andromedae	A	99.3 ± 0.1	Andromeda	23^{h} 09^{m} 57.3642^{s} +35° 32′ 55.658″	K2Ve	7.93		
KZ Andromedae	B	99.3 ± 0.1	Andromeda	23^{h} 09^{m} 57.3642^{s} +35° 32′ 55.658″	K2Ve			
Delta Cassiopeiae (Ruchbah)$		99.4 ± 0.4	Cassiopeia	01^{h} 25^{m} 48.95147^{s} +60° 14′ 07.0225″	A5 IV	2.68#		
Nu² Draconis		99.4 ± 0.5	Draco	17^{h} 32^{m} 10.56856^{s} +55° 11′ 03.2739″	A4IVm	+4.88		
HD 88955 (q Velorum)$		99.7 ± 1.0	Vela	10^{h} 14^{m} 44.1579^{s} -42° 07′ 18.9852″	A2 V	3.85#		
GJ 9689		99.87	Aquila		M0			
System	Star or (sub-) brown dwarf	Distance (ly)	Constellation	Coordinates: RA, Dec (Ep J2000, Eq J2000)	Stellar class	Apparent magnitude (V)	Parallax (mas)	Notes and additional references

== See also ==
- List of nearest stars
- List of star systems within 90–95 light-years
- List of star systems within 100–150 light-years
