= NGC 6970 =

Galaxy in the constellation Indus

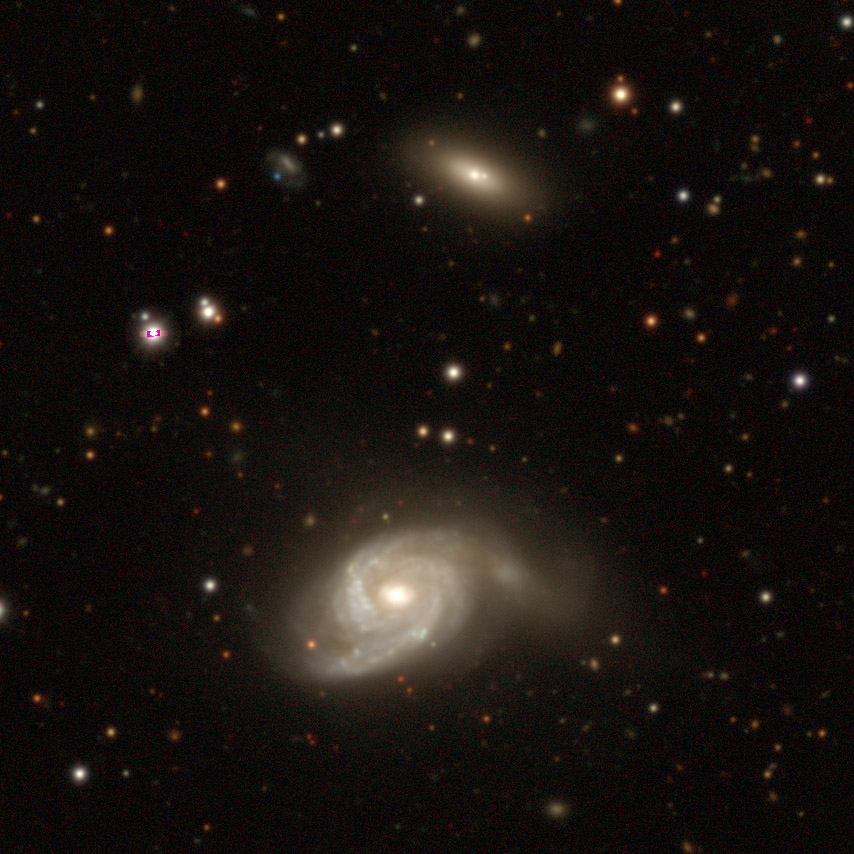
- NGC 6970 (below center) with LEDA 129695 (above center) imaged by Legacy Surveys

Observation data (J2000 epoch)
- Constellation: Indus
- Right ascension: 20^{h} 52^{m} 09.4808^{s}
- Declination: −48° 46′ 40.019″
- Redshift: 0.017525±0.0000870
- Heliocentric radial velocity: 5,254±26 km/s
- Distance: 168.70 ± 16.58 Mly (51.725 ± 5.082 Mpc)
- Group or cluster: NGC 7038 group (LGG 441)
- Apparent magnitude (V): 13.16

Characteristics
- Type: SB(rs)ab pec
- Size: ~82,700 ly (25.37 kpc) (estimated)
- Apparent size (V): 1.4′ × 0.9′

Other designations
- ESO 235- G 008, IRAS 20486-4857, 2MASX J20520946-4846398, PGC 65608

NGC 6970 is a barred spiral galaxy in the constellation of Indus. Its velocity with respect to the cosmic microwave background is 5,089±29 km/s, which corresponds to a Hubble distance of 244.8 ± 17.2 Mly (75.06 ± 5.28 Mpc). However, four non-redshift measurements give a much closer mean distance of 168.70 ± 16.58 Mly (51.725 ± 5.082 Mpc). It was discovered by British astronomer John Herschel on 2 October 1834.

NGC 6970 is a Seyfert I galaxy, i.e. it has a quasar-like nucleus with very high surface brightnesses whose spectra reveal strong, high-ionisation emission lines, but unlike quasars, the host galaxy is clearly detectable.

== NGC 7038 group ==
NGC 6970 is part of the NGC 7038 group (also known as LGG 441), which contains at least 13 galaxies, including NGC 6987, NGC 7014, NGC 7038 and nine galaxies in the ESO catalogue.

== Supernova ==
One supernova has been observed in NGC 6970:

- SN 2025aard (Type Ib, mag. 18.304) was discovered by ATLAS on 17 October 2025.

== See also ==
- List of NGC objects (6001–7000)
