= Kappa Indi =

The Bayer designation Kappa Indi (κ Indi / Kappa Ind / κ Ind) can refer to two different stars in the constellation Indus:

- κ^{1} Indi, a quadruple system more commonly known as BG Indi, with an apparent magnitude of 6.12
- κ^{2} Indi, a red giant with an apparent magnitude of 5.62
