= NGC 7029 =

Galaxy in the constellation Indus

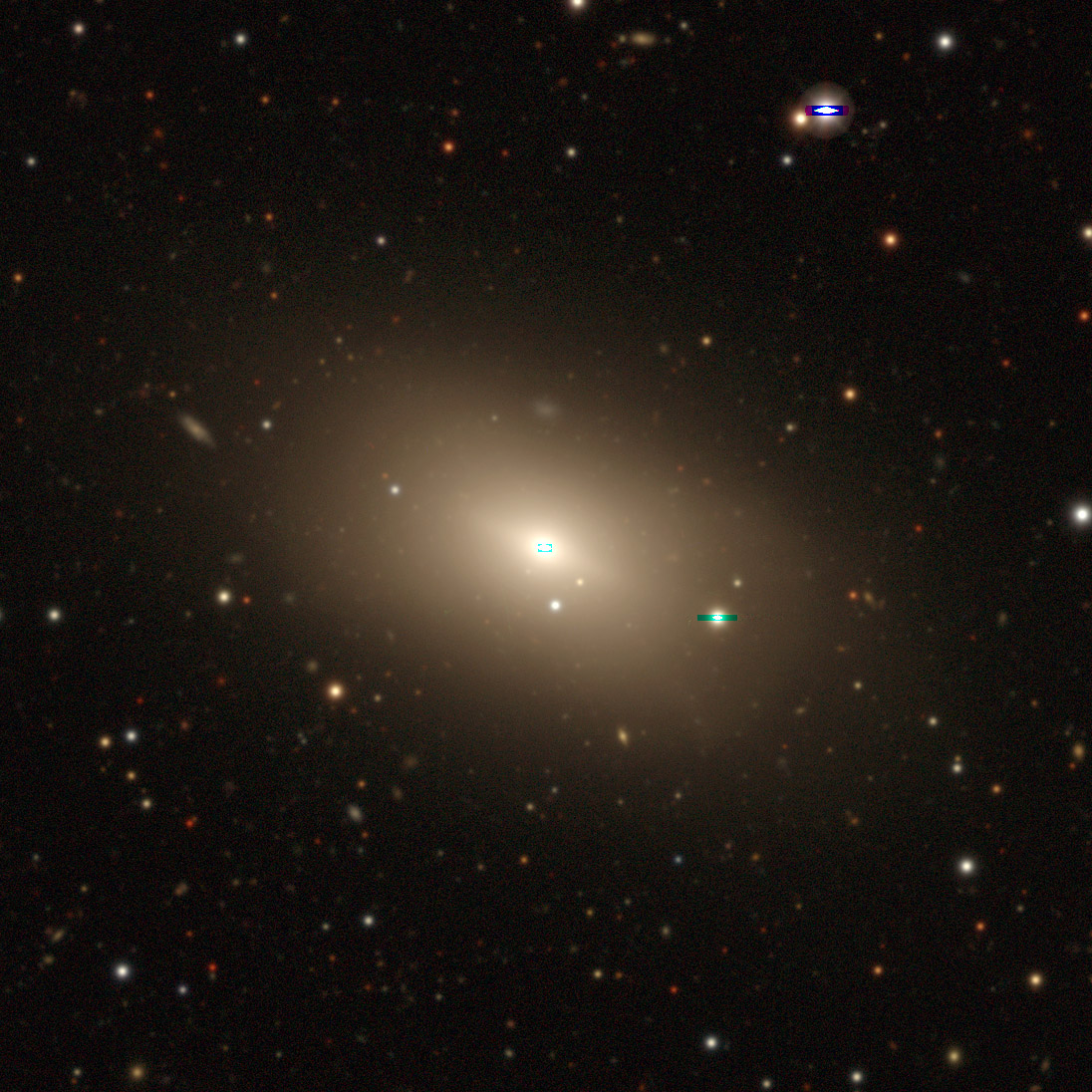
- The elliptical galaxy NGC 7029.

Observation data (J2000 epoch)
- Constellation: Indus
- Right ascension: 21^{h} 11^{m} 52.0^{s}
- Declination: −49° 17′ 01″
- Redshift: 0.009470
- Heliocentric radial velocity: 2,839 km/s
- Distance: 118.7 Mly
- Apparent magnitude (V): 12.35

Characteristics
- Type: E6
- Size: ~128,979.48 ly
- Apparent size (V): 2.6 x 1.4

Other designations
- ESO 235-72, AM 2112-483, PGC 66318

NGC 7029 is an elliptical galaxy located about 120 million light-years away from Earth in the constellation Indus. NGC 7029 has an estimated diameter of 129,000 light-years. It was discovered by astronomer John Herschel on October 10, 1834. It is in a pair of galaxies with NGC 7022.

== Group Membership ==
NGC 7029 is part of the Indus Triplet of galaxies which contains the galaxies NGC 7041 and NGC 7049.

== Supernova ==
One supernova has been observed in NGC 7029:

- SN 2023qov (Type Ia, mag. 17.5) was discovered by ATLAS on 23 August 2023.

== See also ==
- List of NGC objects (7001–7840)
- NGC 7002
