= HIP 107773 =

Giant star in the constellation Indus with one exoplanet

- Location of HIP 107773 in Indus (circled)

Observation data Epoch J2000 Equinox J2000
- Constellation: Indus
- Right ascension: 21^{h} 50^{m} 0.12^{s}
- Declination: −64° 42′ 45.1″
- Apparent magnitude (V): 5.6

Characteristics
- Evolutionary stage: Horizontal branch
- Spectral type: K0III
- B−V color index: 0.99

Astrometry
Radial velocity (R_{v})	−0.1701±0.1237 km/s
Proper motion (μ)	RA: −0.7032±0.0807 mas/yr Dec.: −37.4432±0.0893 mas/yr
Parallax (π)	9.5919 mas
Distance	343.9±2.6 ly (105.5±0.8 pc)
Absolute magnitude (M_{V})	0.54

Details
Mass	2.42±0.27 M_{☉}
Radius	11.6±1.4 R_{☉}
Luminosity	74.13+1.12 −1.15 L_{☉}
Surface gravity (log g)	2.6±0.2 cgs
Temperature	4945±100 K
Age	>1 Gyr

Other designations
- 2MASS J21500013-6442451, FK5 3742, HD 207229, HR 8331, IRAS 21461-6456, PPM 365403, SAO 255080, TIC 406320735, TYC 9119-2234-1

Database references
SIMBAD	data

HIP 107773 is a star located 344 light years from Earth in the southern constellation Indus. It is classified as a horizontal branch K-type giant star, having a spectral type K0III and a radius of 11.6 R_{☉}. With an apparent magnitude of 5.6, the star can be faintly seen with the naked eye. It has an exoplanet, HIP 107773 b, a gas giant orbiting it at a distance of 0.72 astronomical units (108,000,000 km), about the same distance from Venus to the Sun. (Note: The distance from Venus to the Sun is 0.723 AU.)

== Characteristics ==
HIP 107773 is a giant star, having a spectral type K0III, where K0 means it is a K-type star and III (luminosity class) means it is a giant star. The star is in the horizontal branch phase of evolution. HIP 107773 has a radius equivalent to 11.6 solar radii, and a mass equivalent to about 2.4 solar masses. It is cooler than the Sun, having an effective temperature of 4,945 K (4,672 °C). (Note: For comparison, the effective temperature of the Sun is 5,772 K (5,499 °C).) Given the mass and the evolutionary stage of the star, its age is estimated to be at least about one billion years.

== Planetary system ==
HIP 107773 has an exoplanet, HIP 107773 b, discovered in 2015 using the radial velocity method. The planet is classified as a gas giant, having a minimum mass of 2 M_{J} and an estimated radius of 1.19 R_{J}. It orbits its star at a distance of 0.72 astronomical units (108,000,000 km), about the same distance as Venus is from the Sun, and completes one orbit every 144 days (0.39 years). Its orbit is almost circular, with an eccentricity of just 0.09.

With a mass of 2.4 M_{☉}, the star HIP 107773 is one of the most massive stars with a close-in planet.

The HIP 107773 planetary system
Companion (in order from star)	Mass	Semimajor axis (AU)	Orbital period (days)	Eccentricity	Inclination (°)	Radius
b	≥1.98±0.21 M_{J}	0.72±0.03	144.3±0.5	0.09±0.06	—	1.19 (estimate) R_{J}

== See also ==
- List of exoplanets discovered in 2015
- List of stars in Indus
