= NGC 7041B =

Spiral or lenticular galaxy in the constellation Indus

Observation data (J2000 epoch)
- Constellation: Indus
- Right ascension: 21^{h} 17^{m} 49.5^{s}
- Declination: −48° 23′ 26″
- Redshift: 6814 km/s
- Heliocentric radial velocity: 0.022729
- Apparent magnitude (B): 14.8

Characteristics
- Type: S
- Apparent size (V): 0.60′ × 0.32′

Other designations
- PGC 129672

NGC 7041B is a spiral or lenticular galaxy in the constellation Indus. The object was discovered on 7 July 1834 by the British astronomer John Herschel.
