= NGC 7124 =

Galaxy in the constellation Indus

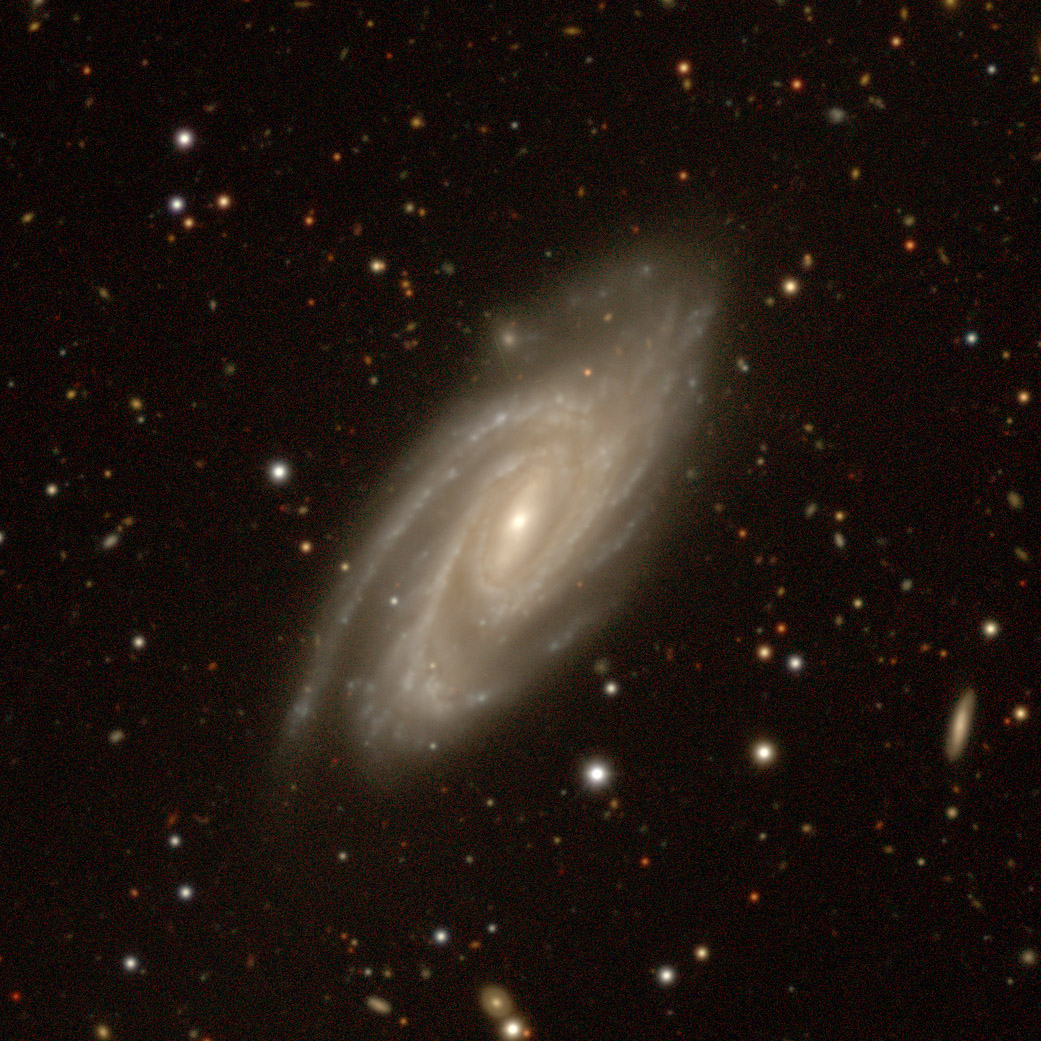
- NGC 7124 imaged by Legacy Surveys

Observation data (J2000 epoch)
- Constellation: Indus
- Right ascension: 21^{h} 48^{m} 05.3679^{s}
- Declination: −50° 33′ 53.979″
- Redshift: 0.017251
- Heliocentric radial velocity: 5172 ± 8 km/s
- Distance: 240.0 ± 16.8 Mly (73.57 ± 5.16 Mpc)
- Apparent magnitude (V): 12.3

Characteristics
- Type: SB(rs)bc
- Size: ~206,200 ly (63.21 kpc) (estimated)
- Apparent size (V): 2.8′ × 1.1′

Other designations
- IRAS 21447-5047, 2MASX J21480540-5033549, PGC 67375, ESO 237- G 002

NGC 7124 is a large spiral galaxy in the constellation of Indus. Its velocity with respect to the cosmic microwave background is 4988 ± 15 km/s, which corresponds to a Hubble distance of 240.0 ± 16.8 Mly (73.57 ± 5.16 Mpc). However, nine non-redshift measurements give a much closer distance of 191.56 ± 4.26 Mly (58.733 ± 1.306 Mpc). It was discovered by British astronomer John Herschel on 8 July 1834.

NGC 7124 is classified as a LINER galaxy, i.e. it has a type of nucleus that is defined by its spectral line emission which has weakly ionized or neutral atoms, while the spectral line emission from strongly ionized atoms is relatively weak.

One supernova has been observed in NGC 7124: SN 2023pwl (Type Ia, mag. 16.728) was discovered by ATLAS on 19 August 2023.

== See also ==
- List of NGC objects (7001–7840)
