= NGC 6984 =

Spiral galaxy in the constellation Indus

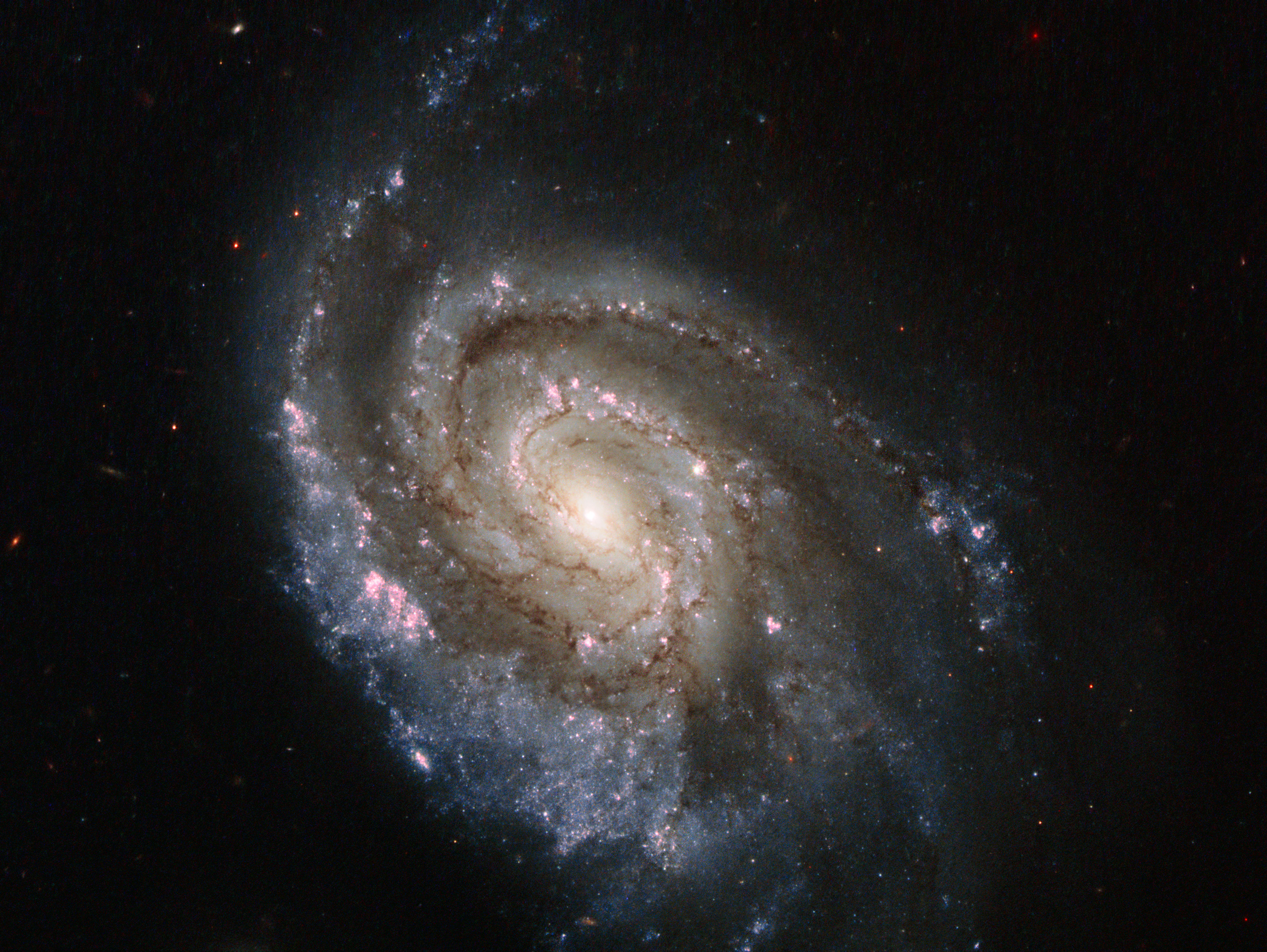
- NGC 6984 imaged by the Hubble Space Telescope

Observation data (J2000 epoch)
- Constellation: Indus
- Right ascension: 20^{h} 57^{m} 53.987^{s}
- Declination: −51° 52′ 15.13″
- Redshift: 0.015386
- Heliocentric radial velocity: 4577 km/s
- Distance: 180 million ly
- Apparent magnitude (V): 12.65
- Apparent magnitude (B): 13.19
- Surface brightness: 22.82 mag/arcsec^{2}
- magnitude (J): 10.94
- magnitude (H): 10.25
- magnitude (K): 9.99

Characteristics
- Type: Spiral (SAc)
- Apparent size (V): 1.403 x 1.038 arcmin

Other designations
- IRAS 20543-5203, 2MASX J20575398-5152151, PGC 65798, AM 2054-520, APMBGC 235+046+104, ISOSS J20578-5152, SGC 205419-5203.8, ESO 235- G 020

NGC 6984 is a barred spiral galaxy located 180 million light years away in the constellation Indus. It is a Type II Seyfert galaxy, a type of active galactic nucleus (AGN). It is situated south of the celestial equator, and is visible with the help of a telescope having an aperture of 10 inches (250 mm) or more. It was discovered on 8 July 1834 by British astronomer John Herschel.

== Supernovae ==
NGC 6984 is notable for having been the host of two supernovae which occurred in the same location (< 0.4 arcsec), about 1 year apart: SN 2012im (Type Ic, mag. 18.9), first known as SNhunt142, and SN 2013ek (Type Ib/c, mag. 16.9). Hubble Space Telescope observations were initiated by Dr. Dan Milisavljevic. NASA's press release about SN 2013ek said:

"It is so close to where SN 2012im was spotted that the two events are thought to be linked; the chance of two completely independent supernovae so close together and of the same class exploding within one year of one another is a very unlikely event. It was initially suggested that SN 2013ek may in fact be SN 2012im flaring up again, but further observations support the idea that they are separate supernovae — although they may be closely related in some as-yet-unknown way."

== Gallery ==
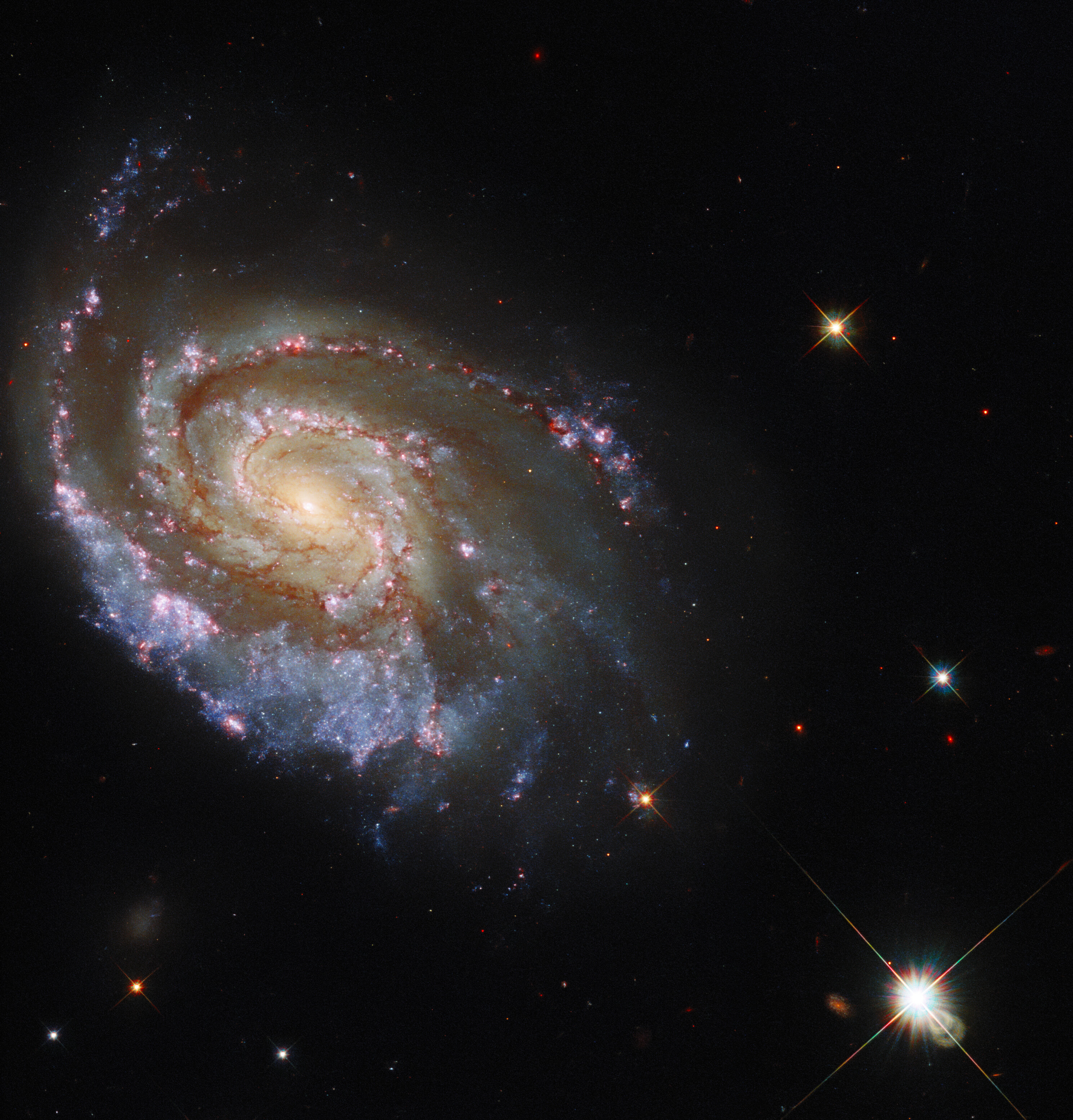
The galaxy NGC 6984, an elegant spiral galaxy in the constellation Indus roughly 200 million light-years away from Earth.
