= NGC 7041 =

Galaxy in the constellation Indus

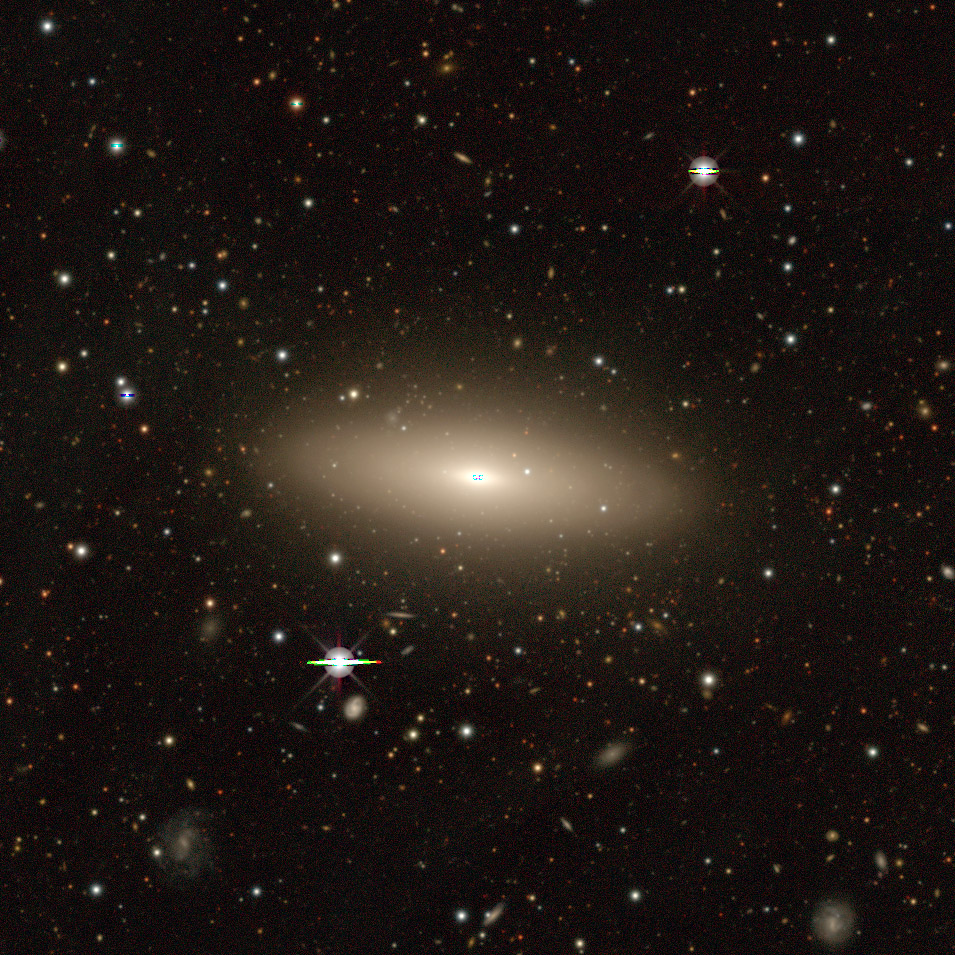
- The lenticular galaxy NGC 7041.

Observation data (J2000 epoch)
- Constellation: Indus
- Right ascension: 21^{h} 16^{m} 32.4^{s}
- Declination: −48° 21′ 49″
- Redshift: 0.006491
- Heliocentric radial velocity: 1.946 km/s
- Distance: 77.8 Mly
- Apparent magnitude (V): 12.09

Characteristics
- Type: SA0
- Apparent size (V): 3.6 x 1.5

Other designations
- ESO 235-82, AM 2113-483, PGC 66463

NGC 7041 is a lenticular galaxy located about 80 million light-years away in the constellation of Indus. NGC 7041 was discovered by astronomer John Herschel on July 7, 1834.

NGC 7041 is part of the Indus Triplet of galaxies which contains the nearby galaxy NGC 7049 and the galaxy NGC 7029.

== See also ==
- NGC 7007 – a barred lenticular galaxy
- List of NGC objects (7001–7840)
