= NGC 7199 =

Galaxy in the constellation Indus

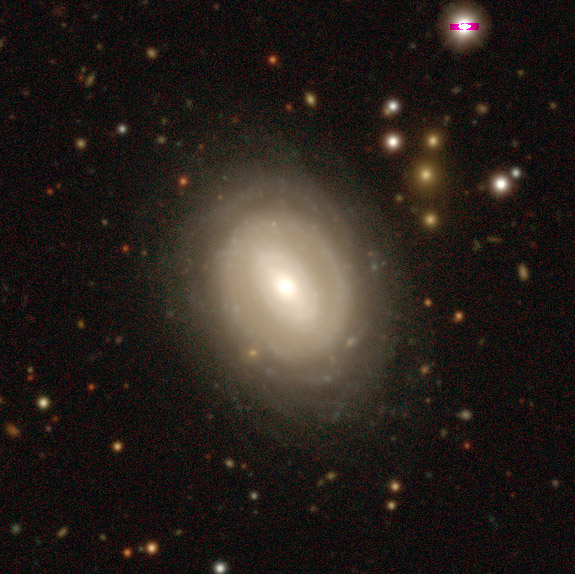

Observation data (J2000 epoch)
- Constellation: Indus
- Right ascension: 22^{h} 08^{m} 29.84816^{s}
- Declination: −64° 42′ 21.9257″
- Redshift: 0.009609
- Heliocentric radial velocity: 2867 km/s
- Distance: 130.1 Mly (39.90 Mpc)
- Apparent magnitude (V): 13.22
- Apparent magnitude (B): 13.87

Characteristics
- Type: SB(r)a

Other designations
- PGC 68124

NGC 7199 is a barred spiral galaxy registered in the New General Catalogue. It is located in the constellation Indus. It was discovered by the English astronomer John Herschel in 1835 using a 47.5 cm (18.7 inch) reflector.

== See also ==
- List of Messier objects
