= 7090 =

7090 may refer to:

- IBM 7090 mainframe computer
- IBM 7090/94 IBSYS operating system
- NGC 7090 spiral galaxy
- A year in the 70th century
