= NGC 7047 =

Galaxy in the constellation Aquarius

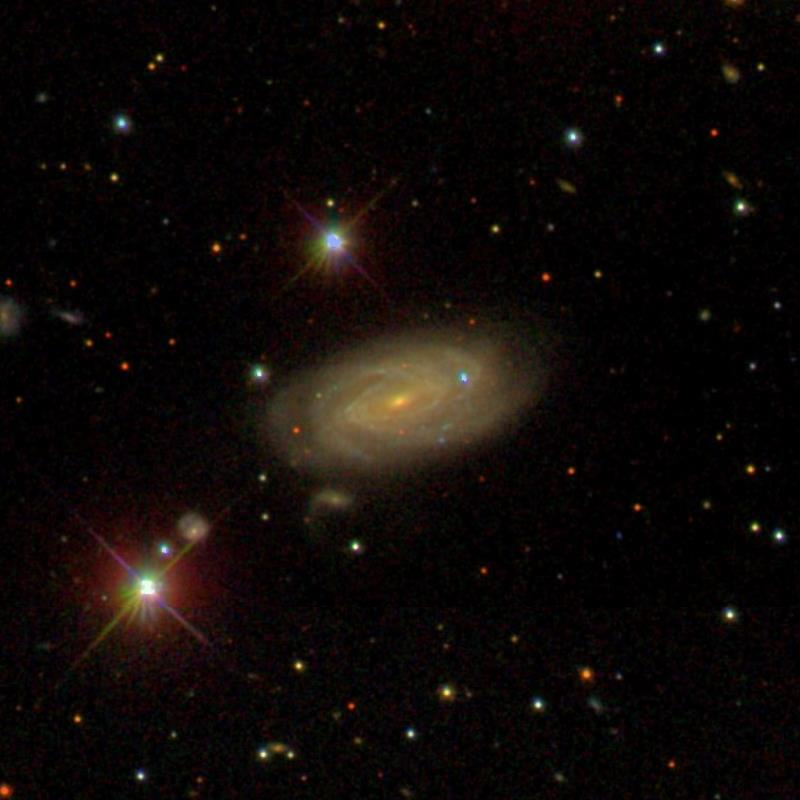
- NGC 7047 (SDSS DR14)

Observation data (J2000 epoch)
- Constellation: Aquarius
- Right ascension: 21^{h} 16^{m} 27.6^{s}
- Declination: −00° 49′ 35″
- Redshift: 0.019383
- Heliocentric radial velocity: 5,811 km/s
- Distance: 270 Mly
- Apparent magnitude (V): 14.0

Characteristics
- Type: SAB(r)b, LINER
- Size: ~127,348 ly (estimated)
- Apparent size (V): 1.38 x 0.69

Other designations
- IRAS 21138-0102, UGC 11712, MCG +00-54-010, PGC 66461, CGCG 375-023

NGC 7047 is an intermediate spiral galaxy located about 270 million light-years away in the constellation of Aquarius. NGC 7047 is also classified as a LINER-type galaxy. NGC 7047 has an estimated diameter of 127,350 light years. It was discovered by French astronomer Édouard Stephan on August 20, 1873.

One supernova has been observed in NGC 7047: PTF09cjq (type II, mag. unknown) was discovered 22 October 2009 by the Palomar Transient Factory.

== See also ==
- NGC 7038 – an intermediate spiral galaxy
- List of NGC objects (7001–7840)
