= IC 5152 =

Irregular galaxy in the constellation Indus

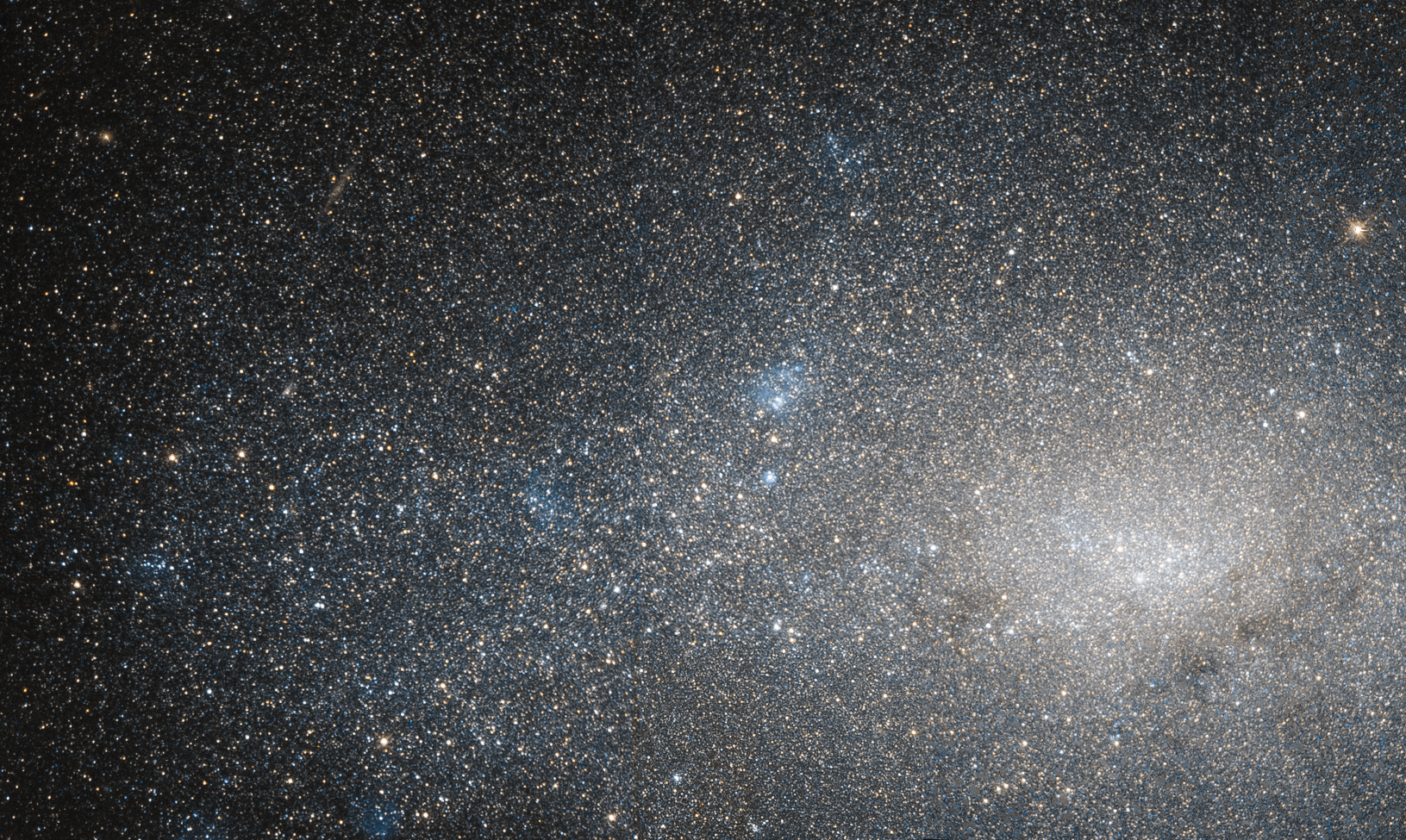
- IC 5152 imaged by the Hubble Space Telescope

Observation data (J2000 epoch)
- Constellation: Indus
- Right ascension: 22^{h} 02^{m} 41.521^{s}
- Declination: −51° 17′ 47.20″
- Redshift: 0.000407
- Heliocentric radial velocity: 122 km/s
- Distance: 5.87 ± 1.22 Mly (1.801 ± 0.374 Mpc)
- Apparent magnitude (V): 10.6

Characteristics
- Type: IA(s)m
- Apparent size (V): 4.9' x 2.8'

Other designations
- AM 2159-513, ESO 237-27, IRAS 21594-5132, PGC 67908, 2MASX J22024152-5117471

IC 5152 is an irregular galaxy 5.8 million light-years from Earth in the constellation Indus. It was discovered by DeLisle Stewart in 1908. It is an open question as to whether it is an outlying member of the Local Group. It is one of the easiest galaxies to resolve into stars, but there is a bright (magnitude 7.7) foreground star (HD 209142) right in front of it that makes deep observations difficult.

== Image gallery ==
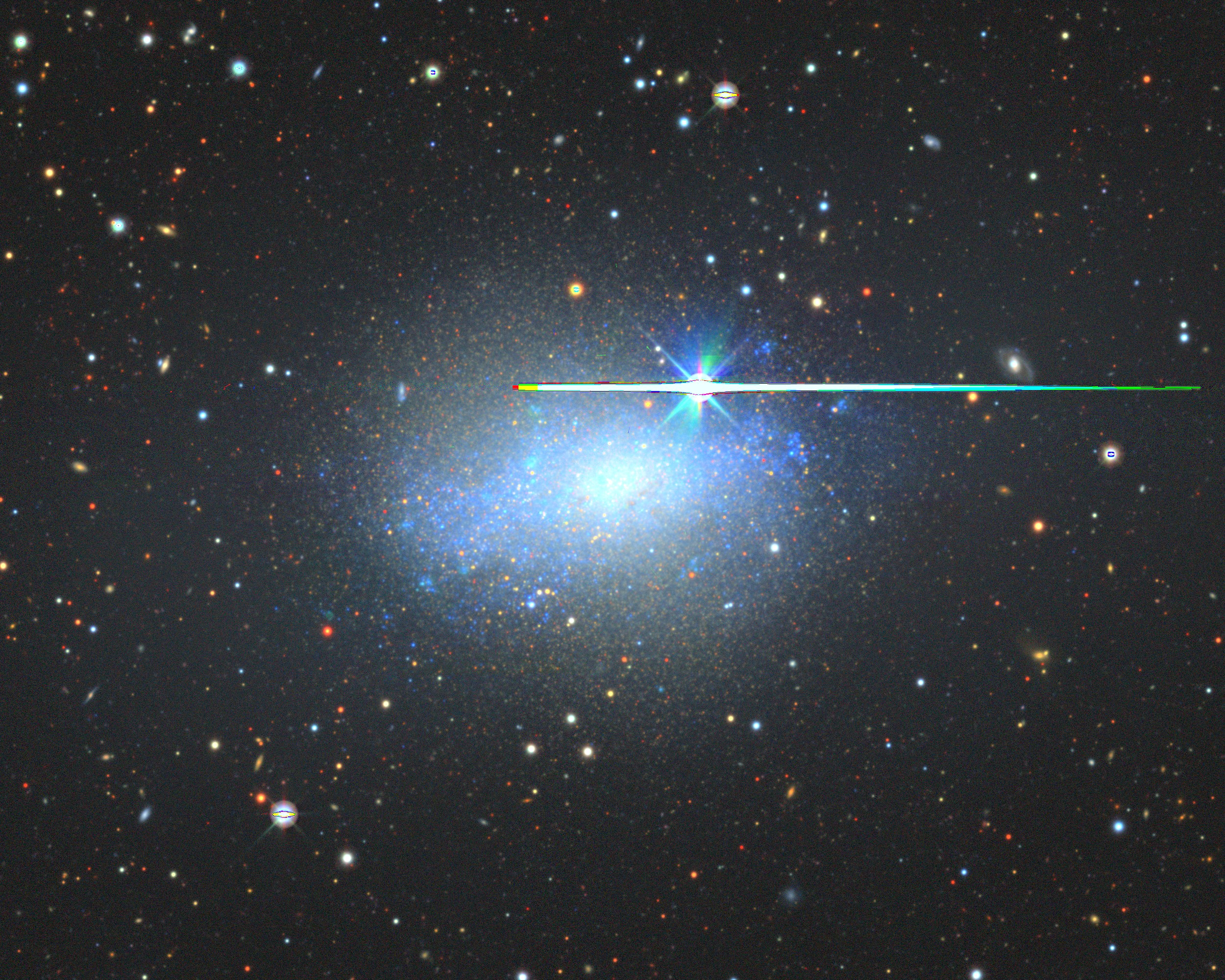
IC 5152 imaged by Legacy Surveys
