= NGC 7038 =

Galaxy in the constellation Indus

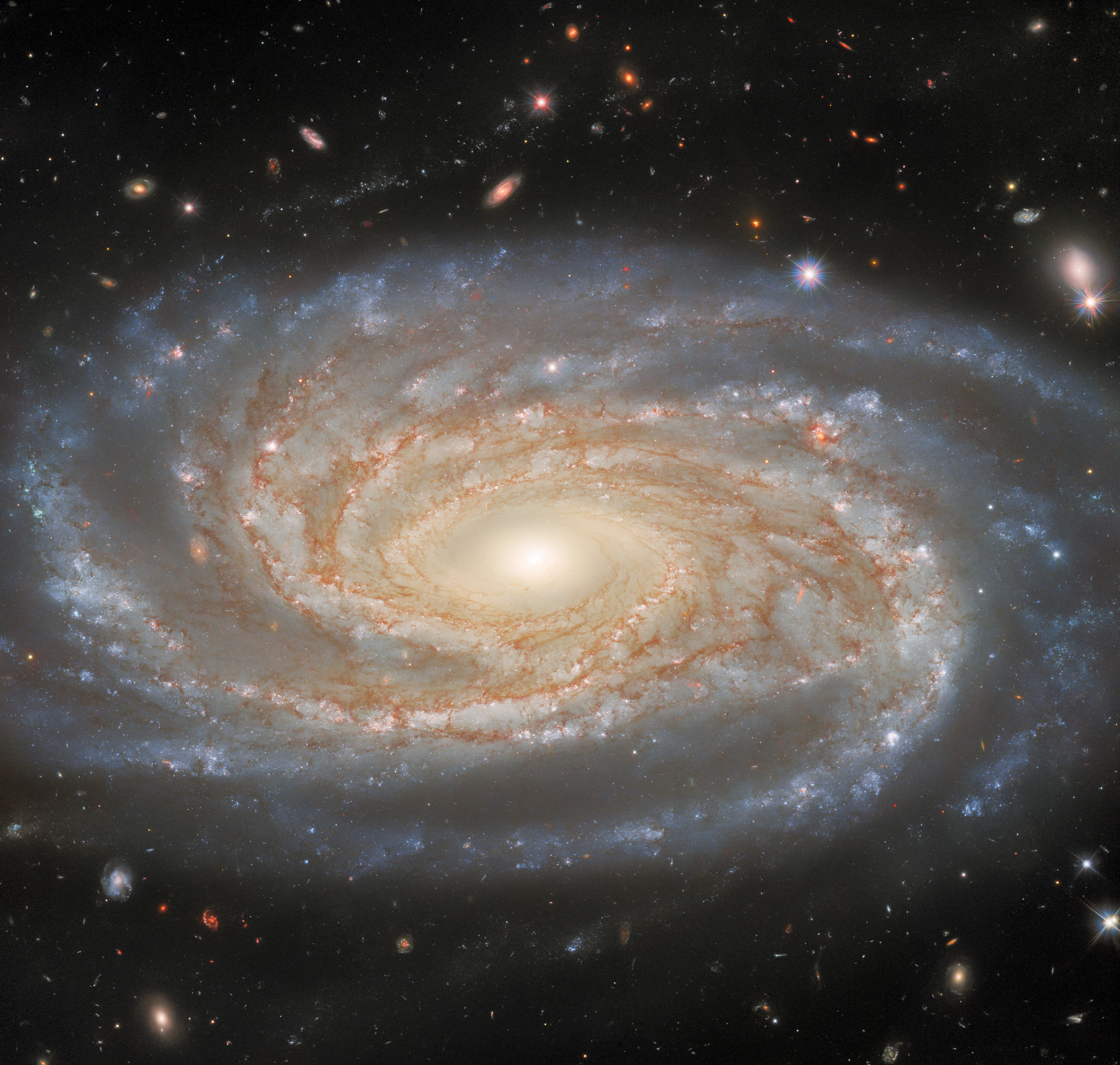
- NGC 7038 imaged by the Hubble Space Telescope

Observation data (J2000 epoch)
- Constellation: Indus
- Right ascension: 21^{h} 15^{m} 07.5^{s}
- Declination: −47° 13′ 14″
- Redshift: 0.016471
- Heliocentric radial velocity: 4,938 km/s
- Distance: 211.6 Mly
- Apparent magnitude (V): 12.55

Characteristics
- Type: SAB(s)c
- Size: 80.08 kiloparsecs (261,100 Light-Years) (diameter; 25.0 mag/arcsec^{2} B-band isophote)
- Apparent size (V): 3.2 x 1.6

Other designations
- ESO 286-79, AM 2111-472, FAIR 960, IRAS 21117-4725, PGC 66414

NGC 7038 is an intermediate spiral galaxy located about 210 million light-years away in the constellation of Indus. Astronomer John Herschel discovered NGC 7038 on September 30, 1834.

NGC 7038 along with NGC 7014 are the brightest members of Abell 3742. Abell 3742 is located near the center of the Pavo–Indus Supercluster.

== Supernovae ==
Three supernovae have been observed in NGC 7038:

- SN 1983L (Type I, mag. 17.1) was discovered by H. Schild and M. Pizarro on 14 June 1983.
- SN 2010dx (Type II, mag. 17.4) was discovered by CHASE (CHilean Automatic Supernovas sEarch) on 8 June 2010.
- SN 2018hsa (Type Ia, mag. 16) was discovered by the Backyard Observatory Supernova Search on November 1, 2018.

== See also ==
- NGC 4725
- NGC 7001
- List of NGC objects (7001–7840)
