= Eta Indi =

Star in the constellation Indus

η Indi
- Location of η Indi (circled)

Observation data Epoch J2000 Equinox ICRS
- Constellation: Indus
- Right ascension: 20^{h} 44^{m} 02.33404^{s}
- Declination: −51° 55′ 15.4970″
- Apparent magnitude (V): 4.52

Characteristics
- Evolutionary stage: Main sequence
- Spectral type: A9IV
- B−V color index: +0.26

Astrometry
Radial velocity (R_{v})	−1.6±0.8 km/s
Proper motion (μ)	RA: +155.80 mas/yr Dec.: −53.86 mas/yr
Parallax (π)	41.37±0.25 mas
Distance	78.8 ± 0.5 ly (24.2 ± 0.1 pc)
Absolute magnitude (M_{V})	+2.59±0.01

Details
Mass	1.60 M_{☉}
Radius	1.66 R_{☉}
Luminosity	7.60 L_{☉}
Temperature	7,500 K
Rotation	0.20–1.12 days
Rotational velocity (v sin i)	75 km/s
Age	100±50 Myr

Other designations
- η Ind, CPD−52°11752, FK5 776, HD 197157, HIP 102333, HR 7920, SAO 246709

Database references
SIMBAD	data

Eta Indi, Latinised from η Indi, is a single, white-hued star in the southern constellation Indus. It is a faint star but visible to the naked eye with an apparent visual magnitude of 4.52.

Measurements with the Hipparcos spacecraft showed the star, which is single, appears to move against the deep sky backdrop by a mean biannual parallax shift of around 41.37 mas, which equates to 79 light-years' distance. Its radial vector to our system's own trajectory (radial velocity) shows it to be in a phase of a narrowing of the gap, at a rounded −2 km/s, net. η Indi appears to be a member of the Octans association, a group of 62 stars that are around 30−50 million years old and have common motion.

The spectrum of this star matches a stellar classification of A9 IV which would suggest it is an evolving subgiant star of type A, but the absolute magnitude of the star argues for a "V" luminosity class and therefore it is likely on the main sequence. The star is estimated 1.6 M_{☉} (masses of the Sun), and 2.27 R_{☉} (its radius). It is shines with 7.60 times the Sun's luminosity, which is radiated from its photosphere at an effective temperature of 7,694 K. The star is spinning with a projected rotational velocity of 75 km/s. It is very likely to be a hybrid Delta Scuti/Gamma Doradus variable.
