= NGC 7049 =

Galaxy in the constellation Indus

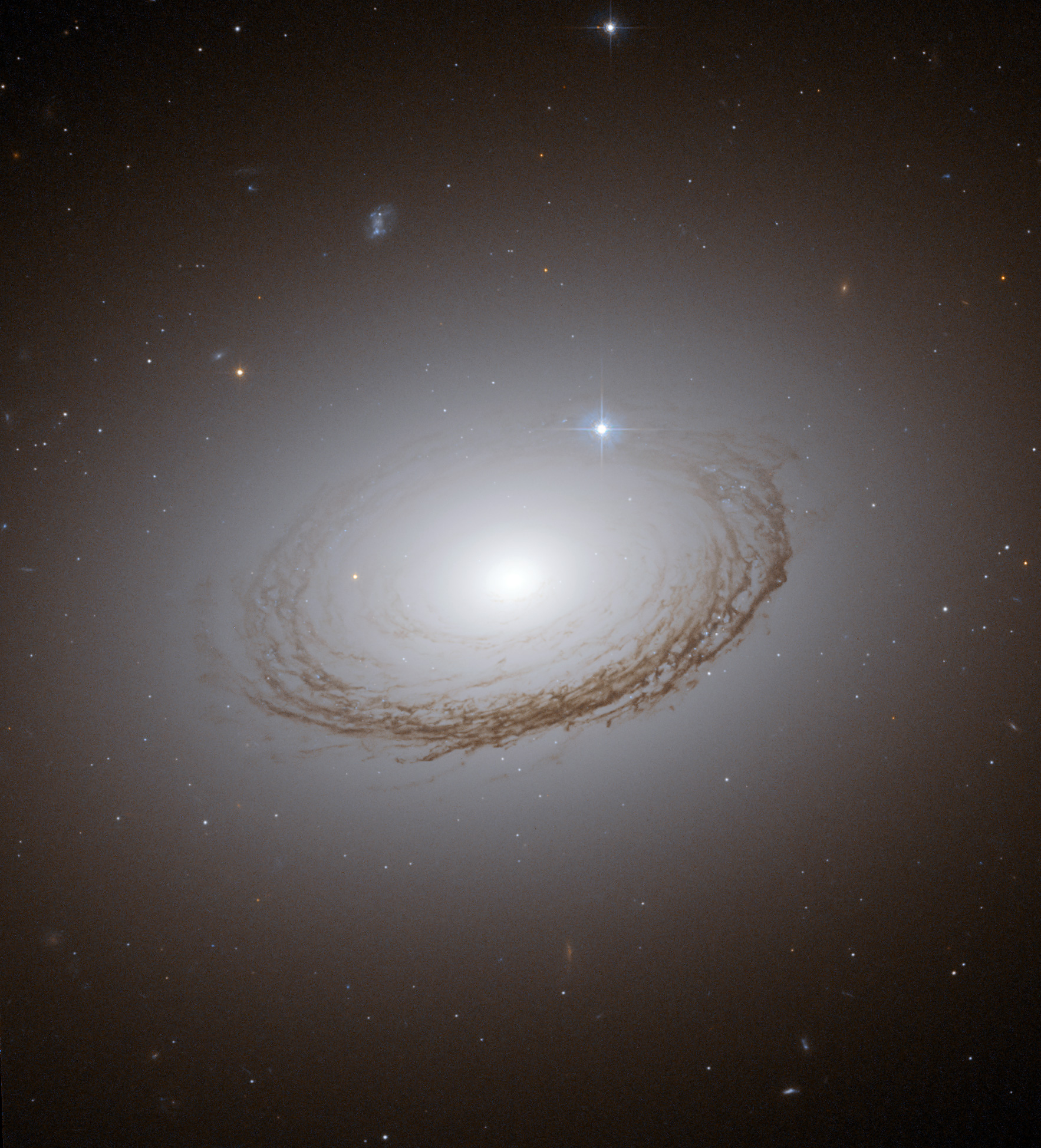
- NGC 7049 - image from the Hubble Space Telescope's Advanced Camera for Surveys

Observation data (J2000 epoch)
- Constellation: Indus
- Right ascension: 21^{h} 19^{m} 00.25^{s}
- Declination: −48° 33′ 43.24″
- Redshift: 2285 km/s
- Distance: 100 Mly
- Apparent magnitude (V): 10.7

Characteristics
- Type: S0
- Size: ~150,000 ly

Other designations
- ESO 236-1, PGC 66549

NGC 7049 is a lenticular galaxy that spans about 150,000 light-years and lies about 100 million light-years away from Earth in the inconspicuous southern constellation of Indus.

NGC 7049's unusual appearance is largely due to a prominent rope-like dust ring which stands out against the starlight behind it. These dust lanes are usually seen in young galaxies with active star-forming regions. NGC 7049 shows the features of both an elliptical galaxy and a spiral galaxy, and has relatively few globular clusters, indicative of its status as a lenticular type. NGC 7049 is the brightest (BCG) of the Indus triplet of galaxies (NGC 7029, NGC 7041, NGC 7049), and its structure might have arisen from several recent galaxy collisions. Typical BCGs are some of the oldest and most massive galaxies.

== Gallery ==
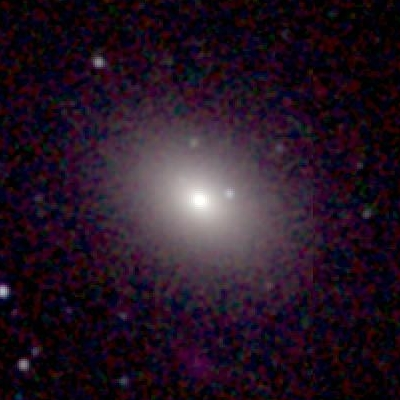
2MASS image of NGC 7049

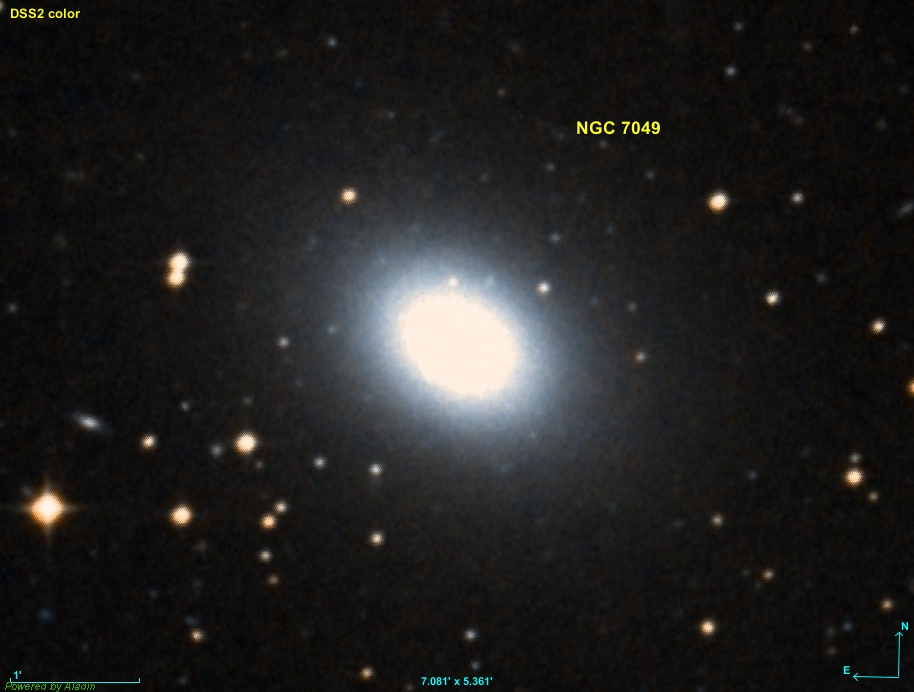
DSS image of NGC 7049
