= Gamma Indi =

Star in the constellation Indus

- Location of γ Indi (circled in red)

Observation data Epoch J2000 Equinox ICRS
- Constellation: Indus
- Right ascension: 21^{h} 26^{m} 15.43919^{s}
- Declination: −54° 39′ 37.6516″
- Apparent magnitude (V): 6.09±0.01

Characteristics
- Evolutionary stage: main sequence
- Spectral type: F1III

Astrometry
Radial velocity (R_{v})	+10.4±0.6 km/s
Proper motion (μ)	RA: +1.040 mas/yr Dec.: +39.036 mas/yr
Parallax (π)	15.1909±0.0250 mas
Distance	214.7 ± 0.4 ly (65.8 ± 0.1 pc)
Absolute magnitude (M_{V})	+1.98

Details
Mass	1.72 M_{☉}
Radius	2.47 R_{☉}
Luminosity	12.5 L_{☉}
Surface gravity (log g)	3.85 cgs
Temperature	6,912 K
Metallicity [Fe/H]	−0.09 dex
Age	1.40 Gyr

Other designations
- CPD−55°9586, HD 203760, HIP 105841, HR 8188, TYC 8810-1289-1

Database references
SIMBAD	data

Gamma Indi is a star in the constellation Indus. Its apparent magnitude is 6.09, much fainter than Delta Indi and unusually faint for a Gamma-labelled star, making it only visible from very dark skies in ideal conditions. Parallax measurements imply a distance of 65.8 parsecs (215 ly). The star is moving away with an heliocentric velocity of +10.4 km/s.

The spectrum of this star matches a spectral class of F1III, with the luminosity class III suggesting it is a giant star that has exhausted the hydrogen at its core. However, stellar evolution models imply that it is not a giant star, but is still on the main sequence. Around 1.72 times the mass of the Sun and 1.40 billion years old, Gamma Indi is nearly 13 times as luminous as the Sun, with a radius 2.47 times larger. All this energy is released from its photosphere shining at an effective temperature of 6,912 K, giving it the yellow-white hue typical of F-type stars.
