= WASP-88 =

F-type main sequence star in the constellation Indus

Observation data Epoch J2000 Equinox J2000
- Constellation: Indus
- Right ascension: 20^{h} 38^{m} 02.6869^{s}
- Declination: −48° 27′ 43.424″
- Apparent magnitude (V): 11.39

Characteristics
- Evolutionary stage: main-sequence
- Spectral type: F6

Astrometry
Radial velocity (R_{v})	−5.1±0.6 km/s
Proper motion (μ)	RA: 5.890 mas/yr Dec.: −4.892 mas/yr
Parallax (π)	1.7844±0.0185 mas
Distance	1,830 ± 20 ly (560 ± 6 pc)

Position (relative to WASP-88)
Component	WASP-88B
Epoch of observation	2017
Angular distance	3.350±0.015″
Position angle	355.5±0.5°
Projected separation	1877±8 AU

Details

WASP-88
Mass	1.450±0.050 M_{☉}
Radius	2.08^{+0.12}_{−0.06} R_{☉}
Luminosity	5.9 L_{☉}
Surface gravity (log g)	4.24±0.06 cgs
Temperature	6450±61 K
Metallicity [Fe/H]	0.03±0.04 dex
Rotational velocity (v sin i)	8.4±0.8 km/s
Age	3.0±1.3 Gyr

WASP-88B
Mass	0.11^{+0.03}_{−0.02} M_{☉}
Temperature	2844^{+155}_{−209} K

Other designations
- Gaia DR2 6482103014085857024, 2MASS J20380268-4827434

Database references
SIMBAD	data

WASP-88 is a F-type main-sequence star. Its surface temperature is 6450±61 K. WASP-88 is similar to the Sun in its concentration of heavy elements, with a metallicity Fe/H index of 0.03±0.04, and is younger at an age of 3.0±1.3 billion years.

A multiplicity survey did detect a candidate red dwarf companion to WASP-88 in 2020, with a 1.65% probability of it being an unrelated background star.

== Planetary system ==
In 2013, one planet, named WASP-88b, was discovered on a tight, circular orbit. The planet is highly inflated, and may be an easy target for atmospheric characterization. Planetary equilibrium temperature is 1775 K. The planetary atmosphere transmission spectrum is gray and featureless, probably indicating a large concentration of hazes.

The WASP-88 planetary system
Companion (in order from star)	Mass	Semimajor axis (AU)	Orbital period (days)	Eccentricity	Inclination	Radius
b	0.570^{+0.077}_{−0.078} M_{J}	0.06438^{+0.00073}_{−0.00074}	4.954000±0.000019	<0.13	88.0^{+1.4}_{−1.5}°	1.70^{+0.13}_{−0.07} R_{J}
