= Abell 3742 =

Galaxy cluster in the constellation Indus

Observation data (Epoch J2000)
- Constellation(s): Indus
- Right ascension: 21^{h} 06^{m} 41.8^{s}
- Declination: −47° 08′ 56″
- Brightest member: NGC 7014
- Richness class: 0
- Bautz–Morgan classification: II-III
- Redshift: 0.016400 (4917 km/s)
- Distance: 64.7 Mpc (211.02 Mly) h^{−1}_{0.73}

Other designations
- Abell 3742, ACO S924, Indus Group, SCL 175 NED03

Abell 3742 is a galaxy cluster located around 200 million light-years (61 Mpc) from Earth in the constellation Indus. The cluster's brightest member is the elliptical galaxy NGC 7014. Abell 3742 is located in the Pavo–Indus Supercluster and is one of three major clusters along with Abell 3656 and Abell 3698.

== See also ==
- Abell catalogue
- List of Abell clusters
- Galaxy cluster
