= NGC 7022 =

Galaxy in the constellation Indus

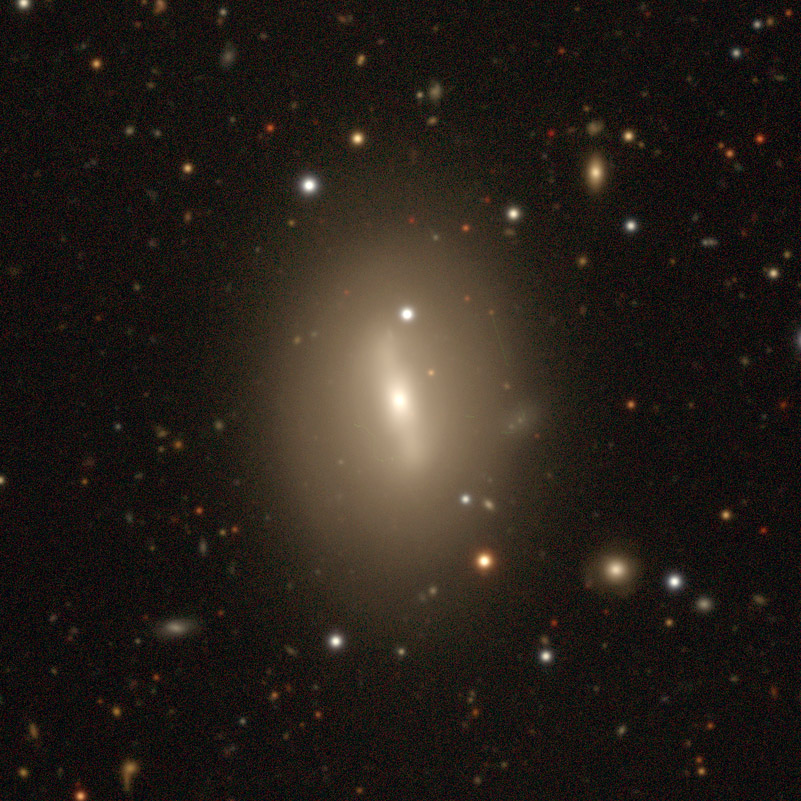
- legacy survey image of the galaxy NGC 7022.

Observation data (J2000 epoch)
- Constellation: Indus
- Right ascension: 21^{h} 09^{m} 35.2^{s}
- Declination: −49° 18′ 13″
- Redshift: 0.007699
- Heliocentric radial velocity: 2308 km/s
- Distance: 95 Mly (29.2 Mpc)
- Apparent magnitude (V): 14.01

Characteristics
- Type: SB(rs)0^0
- Size: ~65,000 ly (20 kpc) (estimated)
- Apparent size (V): 1.5 x 1.1

Other designations
- ESO 235-65, FAIR 952, PGC 66224

NGC 7022 is a barred lenticular galaxy located about 95 million light-years away from Earth in the constellation Indus. The galaxy was discovered by astronomer John Herschel on October 2, 1834.

== See also ==
- List of NGC objects (7001–7840)
- NGC 16 – a lenticular galaxy of similar angular size
- NGC 2787 – a barred lenticular galaxy
