= Nu Indi =

Subgiant star in the constellation Indus

- Location of ν Indi (circled in red)

Observation data Epoch J2000 Equinox J2000
- Constellation: Indus
- Right ascension: 22^{h} 24^{m} 36.88539^{s}
- Declination: −72° 15′ 19.4882″
- Apparent magnitude (V): 5.278±0.005

Characteristics
- Evolutionary stage: Subgiant
- Spectral type: G9V Fe-3.1CH-1.5

Astrometry
Radial velocity (R_{v})	+32.51±0.16 km/s
Proper motion (μ)	RA: +1,303.872 mas/yr Dec.: −674.186 mas/yr
Parallax (π)	35.1281±0.0640 mas
Distance	92.8 ± 0.2 ly (28.47 ± 0.05 pc)
Absolute magnitude (M_{V})	+2.70±0.05

Details
Mass	0.85±0.04 M_{☉}
Radius	2.95±0.12 R_{☉}
Luminosity	6.28±0.23 L_{☉}
Surface gravity (log g)	3.43±0.10 cgs
Temperature	5,318±80 K
Metallicity [Fe/H]	−1.54±0.07 dex
Rotational velocity (v sin i)	2.67 km/s
Age	11.0±0.7 Gyr

Other designations
- ν Indi, CD−72°1742, GJ 855.1, HD 211998, HIP 110618, HR 8515

Database references
SIMBAD	data

Nu Indi is a star in the southern constellation of Indus. With an apparent visual magnitude of +5.278, it is faintly visible to the naked eye in sufficiently dark skies. Based upon parallax measurements, the star is 92.8 light-years distant.

== Characteristics ==
The spectrum of this star matches a classification of G9V Fe-3.1CH-1.5, with the notation G9V suggesting it is a late-type G-type main sequence star. However, it is actually a subgiant, a star which is running out of hydrogen in its core and expanding in size. The "Fe-3.1CH-1.5" indicate an underabundance of methylidyne radical and iron. The star has an overabundance of alpha elements, that is, elements heavier than carbon produced by nuclear reactions involving helium. The metallicity indicators classify it as a Population II star.

Nu Indi has been a target of asteroseismic studies since it displays solar-like oscillations. It was the first metal-poor star of which asteroseismology has been applied. Using this method, its mass and age have been measured at 0.85 solar masses and 11 billion years. As a subgiant, it has expanded in size and become brighter, with a current radius of three solar radii and a luminosity 6.3 times that of the Sun. The effective temperature is 5,318 K, giving it the yellow hue typical of G-type stars.

It is a native member of the galactic halo which is currently crossing the galactic disk. The orbital eccentricity is somewhat high, at 0.60. It reaches a minimum distance of 8,000 light-years from the Galactic Center, and its distance relative to the galactic plane is no more than 4,900 ly. It does not make part of any stellar association or moving group.

Nu Indi was once thought to be a binary star whose components have spectral types of A3V and F9V, but this claim has since been disproven. However, there is evidence it may be an astrometric binary.
