= BG Indi =

Star system

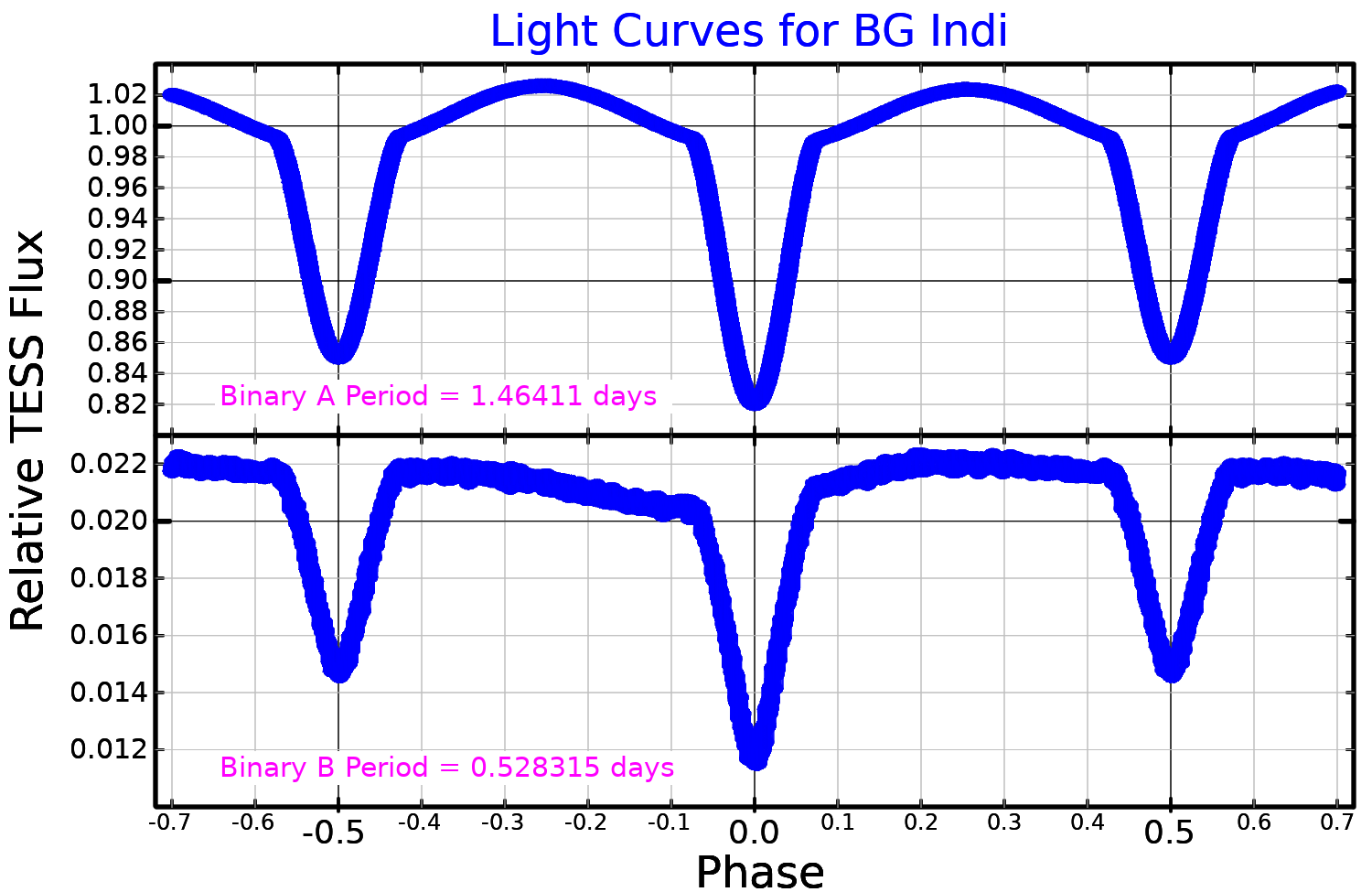
- Light curves from TESS data for the two eclipsing binaries comprising BG Indi, adapted from Borkovits et al. (2021)

Observation data Epoch J2000 Equinox ICRS
- Constellation: Indus
- Right ascension: 21^{h} 58^{m} 30.04050^{s}
- Declination: −59° 00′ 43.4938″
- Apparent magnitude (V): 6.141 (6.11 - 6.36)

Characteristics
- Spectral type: F3V
- Variable type: Algol

Astrometry
| Radial velocity (R_{v}) | 19.0 ± 0.5 km/s |
| Proper motion (μ) | RA: 24.729 mas/yr Dec.: 15.315 mas/yr |
| Parallax (π) | 19.5917±0.2028 mas |
| Distance | 166 ± 2 ly (51.0 ± 0.5 pc) |
| Absolute magnitude (M_{V}) | 2.45 / 3.02 / 7.23 / 7.83 |
| Absolute bolometric magnitude (M_{bol}) | 2.45 / 3.04 / 6.72 / 7.09 |

Orbit
| Primary | BG Ind A |
| Name | BG Ind B |
| Period (P) | 720.9+3.4 −3.1 d |
| Semi-major axis (a) | 540.4+2.7 −2.2 R_{☉} |
| Eccentricity (e) | 0.209+0.028 −0.048 |
| Inclination (i) | 85.5+3.1 −6.3° |
| Periastron epoch (T) | 2458699+14 −21 |
| Argument of periastron (ω) (secondary) | 1.6+9.2 −8.8° |
| Semi-amplitude (K_{1}) (primary) | 12.57+0.17 −0.24 km/s |
| Semi-amplitude (K_{2}) (secondary) | 26.02+0.31 −0.50 km/s |

Orbit
| Primary | BG Ind Aa |
| Name | BG Ind Ab |
| Period (P) | 1.464065(2) d |
| Semi-major axis (a) | 7.602+0.038 −0.043 R_{☉} |
| Eccentricity (e) | 0 |
| Inclination (i) | 73.27+0.06 −0.13° |
| Periastron epoch (T) | 2458326.1362+0.0011 −0.0012 (Note: This refers to the epoch of primary transit.) |
| Semi-amplitude (K_{1}) (primary) | 120.47+1.12 −0.75 km/s |
| Semi-amplitude (K_{2}) (secondary) | 130.99+0.48 −0.50 km/s |

Orbit
| Primary | BG Ind Ba |
| Name | BG Ind Bb |
| Period (P) | 0.528349(2) d |
| Semi-major axis (a) | 3.025+0.011 −0.016 R_{☉} |
| Eccentricity (e) | 0 |
| Inclination (i) | 84.29+0.85 −0.87° |
| Periastron epoch (T) | 2458325.8072+0.0025 −0.0022 |
| Semi-amplitude (K_{1}) (primary) | 138.98+1.23 −1.39 km/s |
| Semi-amplitude (K_{2}) (secondary) | 149.25+1.09 −1.13 km/s |

Details

κ^{1} Ind Aa
| Mass | 1.432+0.015 −0.024 M_{☉} |
| Radius | 2.339+0.016 −0.021 R_{☉} |
| Luminosity (bolometric) | 8.433+0.199 −0.169 L_{☉} |
| Surface gravity (log g) | 3.852+0.011 −0.005 cgs |
| Temperature | 6442+29 −28 K |

κ^{1} Ind Ab
| Mass | 1.315+0.026 −0.023 M_{☉} |
| Radius | 1.592+0.047 −0.019 R_{☉} |
| Luminosity (bolometric) | 4.934+0.279 −0.179 L_{☉} |
| Surface gravity (log g) | 4.150+0.007 −0.016 cgs |
| Temperature | 6816±26 K |

κ^{1} Ind Ba
| Mass | 0.688+0.008 −0.011 M_{☉} |
| Radius | 0.642+0.005 −0.007 R_{☉} |
| Luminosity (bolometric) | 0.167±0.009 L_{☉} |
| Surface gravity (log g) | 4.660+0.003 −0.002 cgs |
| Temperature | 4609+48 −49 K |

κ^{1} Ind Bb
| Mass | 0.640+0.010 −0.011 M_{☉} |
| Radius | 0.611+0.008 −0.009 R_{☉} |
| Luminosity (bolometric) | 0.118±0.009 L_{☉} |
| Surface gravity (log g) | 4.672±0.004 cgs |
| Temperature | 4327+62 −57 K |

Other designations
- κ^{1} Ind, BG Ind, CD−59°7830, FK5 3752, HD 208496, HIP 108478, HR 8369, SAO 247247

Database references
| SIMBAD | data |

BG Indi, also known as κ^{1} Indi (Kappa^{1} Indi) is a multiple star system in the southern constellation of Indus. Its average apparent magnitude is 6.141, meaning it can only be seen by the naked eye under exceptionally good viewing conditions. Stellar parallax measurements by Gaia put the system at about 166 light-years (51 parsecs) away.

== Nomenclature ==
The star system is most commonly known as BG Indi. BG Indi is its variable star designation, a unique name given to variable stars based on its constellation and when it was discovered to be a variable. It also has the name κ^{1} Indi (Latinized to Kappa^{1} Indi), which is its Bayer designation.

== Properties ==
BG Indi consists of four stars in two compact, orbiting pairs. The brighter pair is known as BG Indi A, and consists of two F-type main-sequence stars Aa and Ab. As F-type stars, they are more massive, larger, and hotter than the Sun, and with a metallicity of −0.2 ± 0.1, it is less metal-rich than the Sun. BG Indi is about 2.65 billion years old, and is just starting to leave the main sequence.

BG Indi Aa and Ab orbit each other on a circular orbit, with a period of 1.46 days. Periodically, one star passes in front of the other, blocking its light. Therefore, the apparent magnitude varies from 6.11 to 6.36. Its status as an eclipsing binary was confirmed by J. Manfroid and G. Mathys in 1984.

The other two stars, BG Indi Ba and Bb, form the pair BG Indi B. Both are less massive than the Sun, and orbit each other on a tighter orbit with a period of 0.53 days. Collectively, BG Indi A and B orbit each other with a period of 720.9 days with a moderate eccentricity of 0.209. All three orbits are likely to be more or less coplanar. BG Indi is the nearest quadruple star system consisting of two eclipsing binaries.
