= NGC 7014 =

Galaxy in the constellation Indus

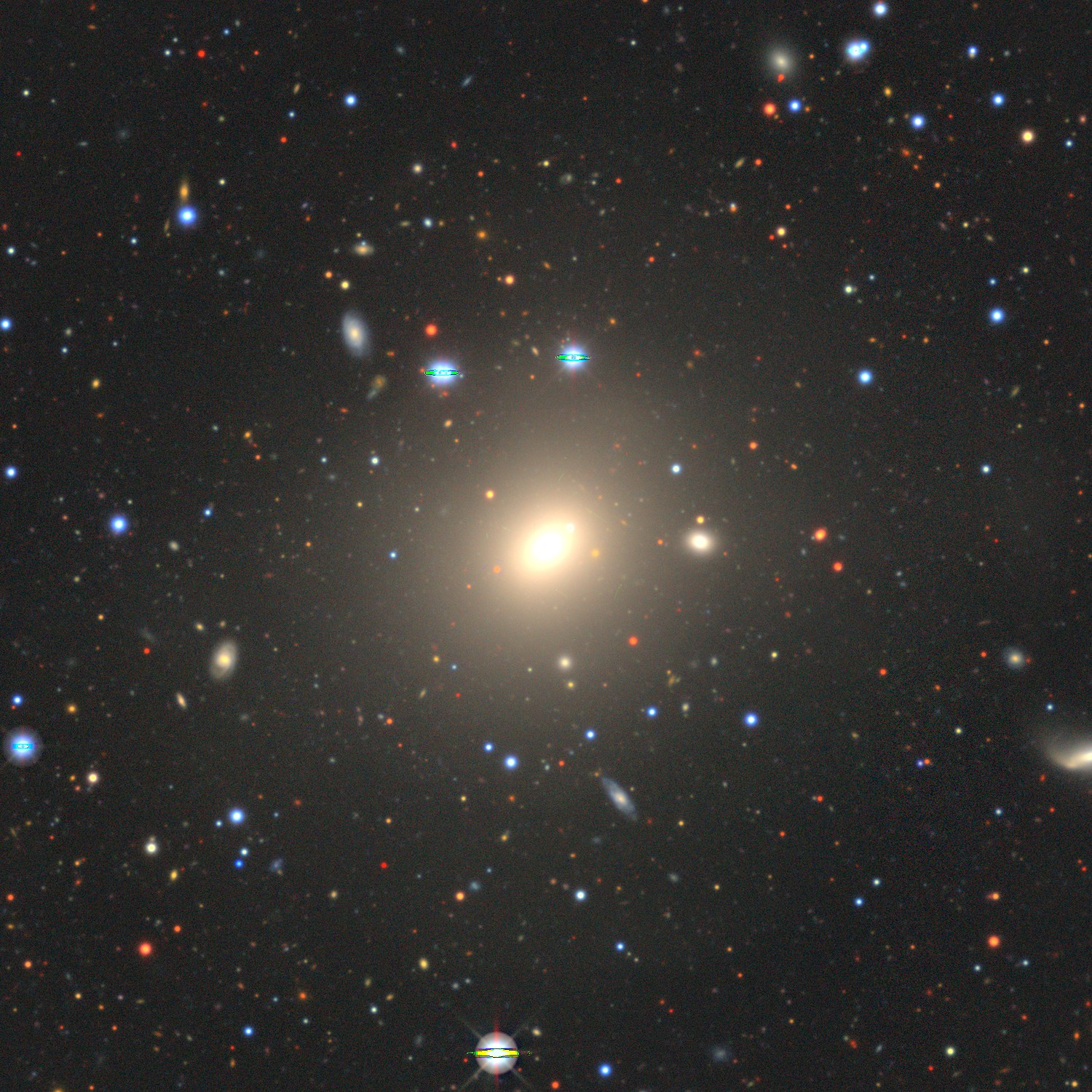
- NGC 7014 imaged by Legacy Surveys

Observation data (J2000 epoch)
- Constellation: Indus
- Right ascension: 21^{h} 07^{m} 52.2^{s}
- Declination: −47° 10′ 44″
- Redshift: 0.016201
- Heliocentric radial velocity: 4,857 km/s
- Distance: 208 Mly (63.8 Mpc)
- Apparent magnitude (V): 13.38
- Absolute magnitude (B): -22.72 ± 0.37

Characteristics
- Type: E
- Mass: 9.6×10^{10} (Stellar mass) 6.52×10^{11} (Total Mass) M_{☉}
- Size: ~132,900 ly (40.74 kpc) (estimated)
- Apparent size (V): 1.9 x 1.5

Other designations
- ESO 286-57, PGC 66153

NGC 7014 is an elliptical galaxy located about 210 million light-years away from Earth in the constellation Indus. NGC 7014 was discovered by English astronomer John Herschel on October 2, 1834. A population of around 1,634 known globular clusters surround the galaxy, and it is also host to a supermassive black hole with an estimated mass of 2.6 billion M_{☉}. NGC 7014 is also classified as a type 1 seyfert galaxy.

== Group membership ==
NGC 7014 is the brightest member of Abell 3742 which is located near the center of the Pavo–Indus Supercluster.

== See also ==
- M87
- NGC 7002
- List of NGC objects (7001–7840)
