= HD 205877 =

Star in the constellation Indus

Observation data Epoch J2000 Equinox ICRS
- Constellation: Indus
- Right ascension: 21^{h} 39^{m} 59.719^{s}
- Declination: −52° 21′ 32.43″
- Apparent magnitude (V): 6.21

Characteristics
- Spectral type: F7III
- U−B color index: 0.32
- B−V color index: 0.596

Astrometry
Proper motion (μ)	RA: −17.62±0.59 mas/yr Dec.: 7.04±0.37 mas/yr
Parallax (π)	5.75±0.55 mas
Distance	570 ± 50 ly (170 ± 20 pc)

Orbit
Primary	HD 205877 A
Name	HD 205877 B
Period (P)	21.31±0.74 yr
Semi-major axis (a)	0.0762±0.0084″
Eccentricity (e)	0.54±0.18
Inclination (i)	150.4±11.1°
Longitude of the node (Ω)	31.5±74.2°
Periastron epoch (T)	1998.80±1.45
Argument of periastron (ω) (secondary)	231.4±66.6°

Details

A
Mass	2.34 M_{☉}

B
Mass	2.20 M_{☉}

Other designations
- HDS 3084, HIP 106978, HR 8269, WDS J21400-5222AB

Database references
SIMBAD	data

HD 205877 is a visual binary star system in the constellation Indus. It also a double lined spectroscopic binary. The components are very similar and both are located on the giant branch in the Hertzsprung–Russell diagram in agreement with the F7III spectral type.

== Stellar system ==
The visual binary nature of HD 205877 was discovered by the Hipparcos spacecraft and given the double star discoverer designation HDS 3084. The preliminary orbital elements of the system were determined with speckle interferometric measurements made at the 4.1 m Southern Astrophysical Research Telescope in Chile.
