= KZ Andromedae =

Star in the constellation Andromeda

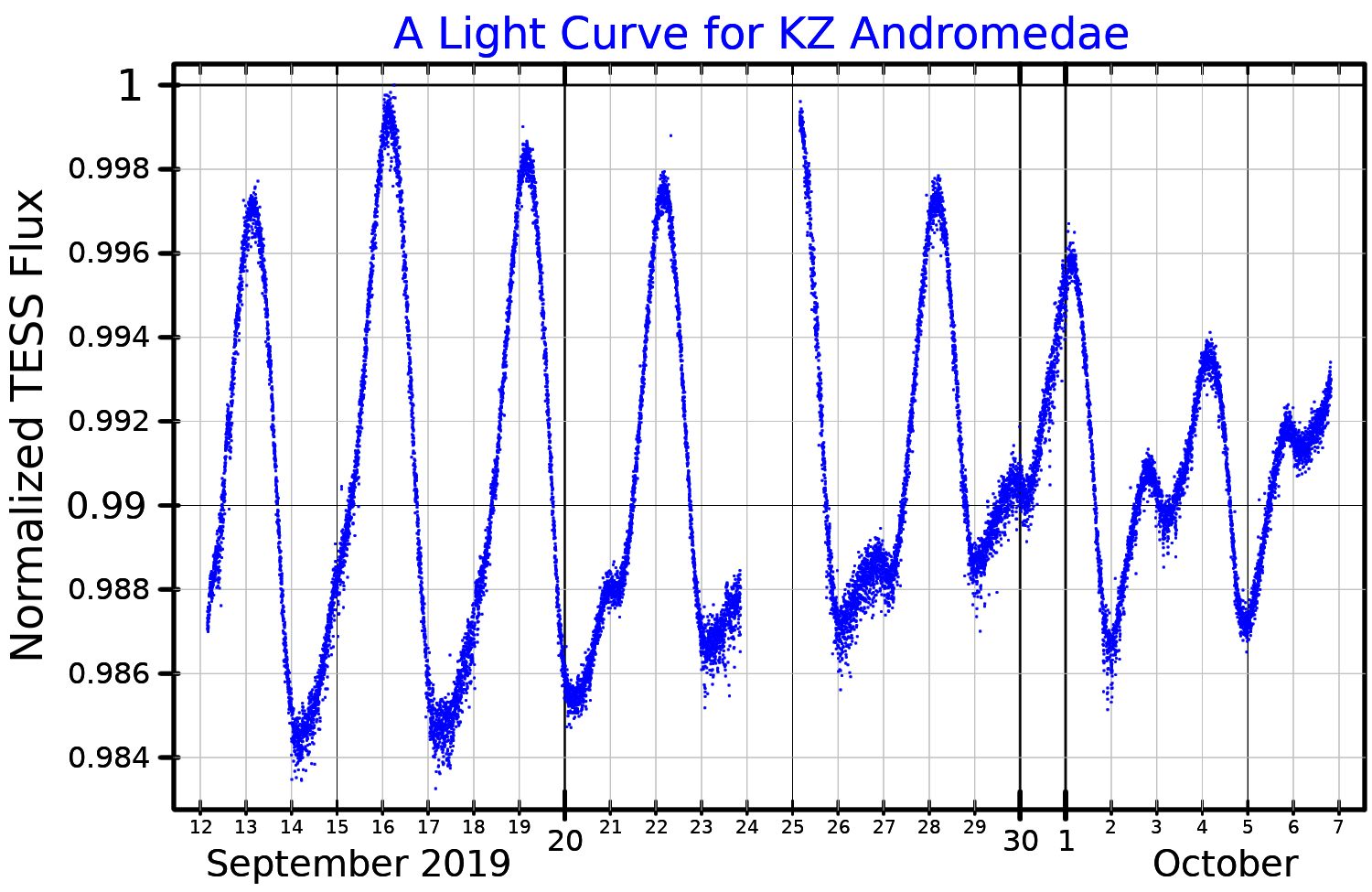
- A light curve for KZ Andromedae, plotted from TESS data

Observation data Epoch J2000 Equinox ICRS
- Constellation: Andromeda
- Right ascension: 23^{h} 09^{m} 57.3642^{s}
- Declination: +35° 32′ 55.658″
- Apparent magnitude (V): 7.91 – 8.03 variable

Characteristics
- Spectral type: K2Ve+K2Ve
- Apparent magnitude (B): 8.81
- Apparent magnitude (V): 7.93
- Apparent magnitude (G): 7.6580
- Apparent magnitude (J): 6.225
- Apparent magnitude (H): 5.778
- Apparent magnitude (K): 5.659
- Variable type: BY Dra

Astrometry
Radial velocity (R_{v})	−5.818±0.026 km/s
Proper motion (μ)	RA: 150.123±0.063 mas/yr Dec.: 1.226±0.059 mas/yr
Parallax (π)	32.8449±0.0369 mas
Distance	99.3 ± 0.1 ly (30.45 ± 0.03 pc)

Orbit
Period (P)	3.03291126±0.00000046 days
Eccentricity (e)	0.01174±0.00056
Periastron epoch (T)	HJD 2455133.480±0.020
Argument of periastron (ω) (secondary)	7.11±2.35°
Semi-amplitude (K_{1}) (primary)	69.362±0.046 km/s
Semi-amplitude (K_{2}) (secondary)	71.300±0.054 km/s

Details

Primary
Radius	0.77±0.07 R_{☉}
Luminosity	0.34±0.06 L_{☉}
Rotational velocity (v sin i)	12.5 km/s

Secondary
Radius	0.66±0.06 R_{☉}
Luminosity	0.25±0.04 L_{☉}
Rotational velocity (v sin i)	12.2 km/s

Other designations
- 2E 4687, 2MASS J23095734+4757300, BD+47 4058, EUVE J2309+47.9, HD 218738, HIP 114379, GJ 4315, TYC 3627-1822-1, NLTT 2314, SAO 52753, WDS J23100+4758B

Database references
SIMBAD	data

KZ Andromedae (often abbreviated to KZ And) is a double lined spectroscopic binary in the constellation Andromeda. Its apparent visual magnitude varies between 7.91 and 8.03 during a cycle slightly longer than 3 days.

== System ==
Both stars in the KZ Andromedae system are main sequence stars of spectral type K2Ve, meaning that the spectrum shows strong emission lines. This is caused by their active chromospheres that cause large spots on the surface.

KZ Andromedae is listed in the Washington Double Star Catalog as the secondary component in a visual binary system, with the primary being HD 218739. In 50 years of observations, there is little evidence of relative motion between the two stars; however, they have a common proper motion and a similar radial velocity.

== Variability ==
The rotational velocity of both stars is consistent with a synchronous rotation of the pair, and the rotational period is itself comparable to the brightness variation period. KX Andromedae is thus classified as a BY Draconis variable, and the variability is caused by the large spots on the surface.
