= NGC 7090 =

Spiral galaxy in the constellation Indus

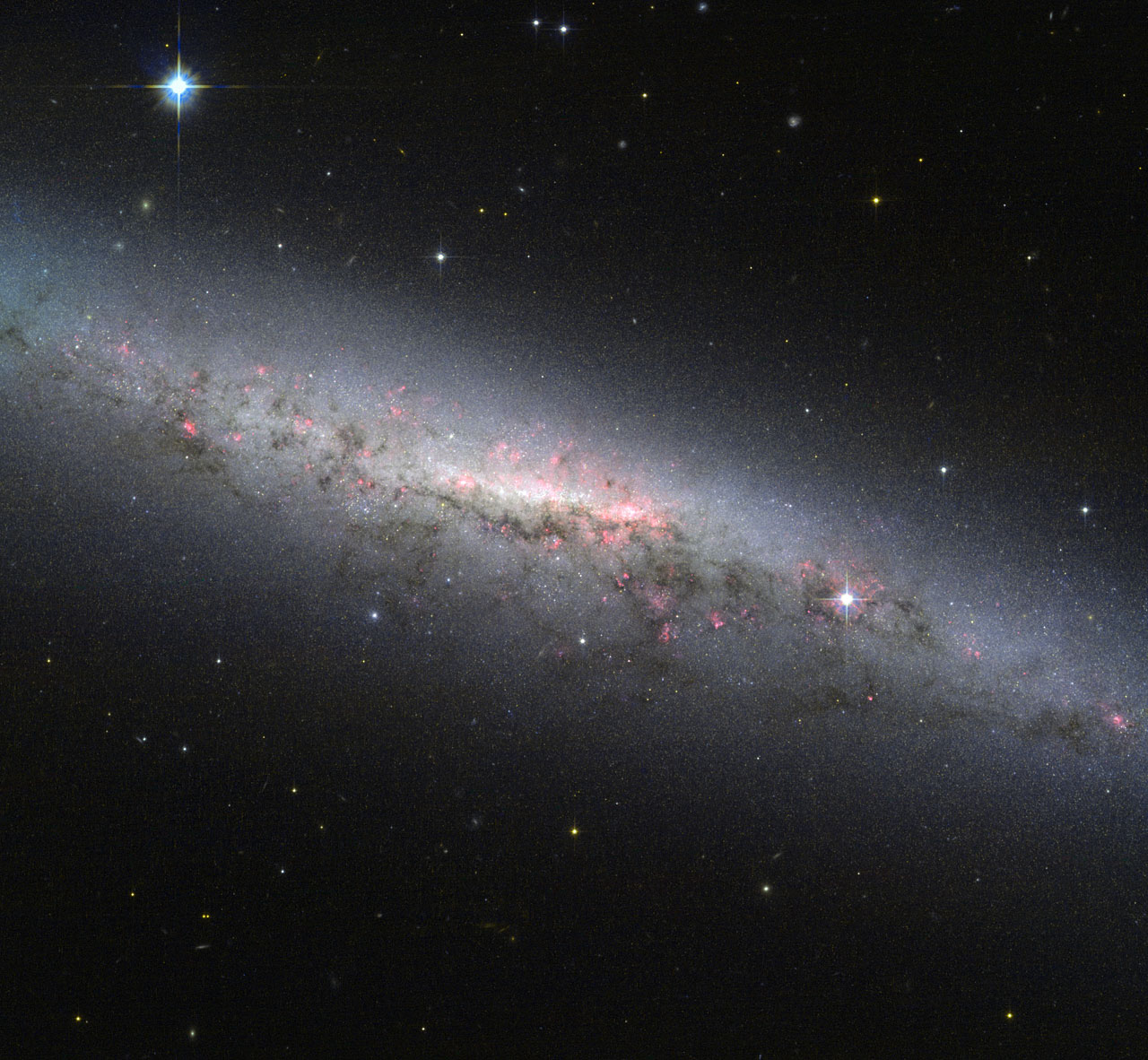
- Portion of NGC 7090 imaged by the Hubble Space Telescope combines orange light (colored blue here), infrared (colored red) and emissions from glowing hydrogen gas (also in red)

Observation data (J2000 epoch)
- Constellation: Indus
- Right ascension: 21^{h} 36^{m} 28.865^{s}
- Declination: −54° 33′ 26.35″
- Redshift: 0.002859±0.000020
- Heliocentric radial velocity: 846 km/s
- Distance: 31.0 Mly (9.5 Mpc)
- Apparent magnitude (V): 10.51

Characteristics
- Type: Scd
- Mass: Stellar: 5.47×10^{9} M_{☉}
- Apparent size (V): 7.4′ × 1.3′

Other designations
- ESO 188- G 012, IRAS 21329-5446, 2MASX J21362886-5433263, LEDA 67045

NGC 7090 is a spiral galaxy in the southern constellation of Indus located about 31 million light-years away. English astronomer John Herschel first observed this galaxy on 4 October 1834.

The morphological class of NGC 7090 is Scd, indicating it is a spiral with loosely-wound and somewhat disorganized arms. The galactic plane is inclined at an angle of 89° to the line of sight from the Earth, giving it an edge-on view. The combined mass of the stars in this galaxy is 5.5 billion times the mass of the Sun (M_{☉}), while the star formation rate is ~0.5 M_{☉}·yr^{−1}. As a result of star formation, the diffuse ionized gas in the galaxy has a complex organization, showing filaments, bubbles, and super-shells.

Three transient ultraluminous X-ray sources have been detected in NGC 7090.

== Gallery ==
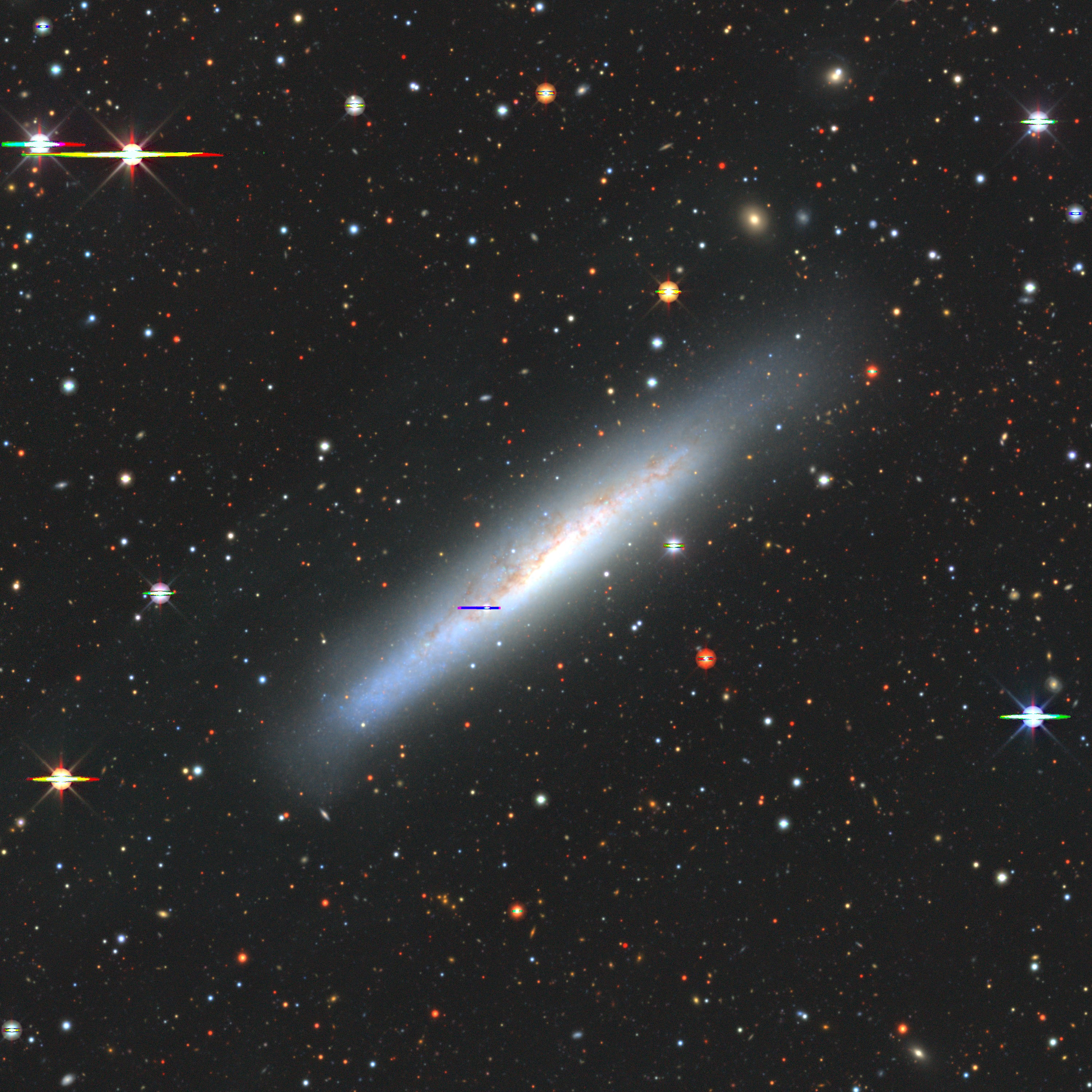
NGC 7090 imaged by Legacy Surveys
