= Alpha Indi =

Star in the constellation Indus

α Indi
- Location of α Indi (circled)

Observation data Epoch J2000 Equinox J2000
- Constellation: Indus
- Right ascension: 20^{h} 37^{m} 34.032^{s}
- Declination: −47° 17′ 29.41″
- Apparent magnitude (V): 3.11

Characteristics
- Evolutionary stage: red clump
- Spectral type: K0 III–IV
- U−B color index: +0.79
- B−V color index: +1.00

Astrometry
Radial velocity (R_{v})	−1.3 km/s
Proper motion (μ)	RA: +50.922 mas/yr Dec.: +66.026 mas/yr
Parallax (π)	32.8989±0.2225 mas
Distance	99.1 ± 0.7 ly (30.4 ± 0.2 pc)
Absolute magnitude (M_{V})	0.78±0.03

Details
Mass	2.15±0.13 M_{☉}
Radius	9.89±0.21 R_{☉}
Luminosity	50.9±1.6 L_{☉}
Surface gravity (log g)	2.73±0.094 cgs
Temperature	4,904±37 K
Metallicity [Fe/H]	−0.038±0.029 dex
Age	1.572±0.273 Gyr

Other designations
- α Ind, CD−47°13477, FK5 769, GJ 794.1, GJ 9700, HD 196171, HIP 101772, HR 7869, SAO 230300

Database references
SIMBAD	data

Alpha Indi (α Ind, α Indi) is the brightest star in the southern constellation Indus. Parallax measurements imply that it is located about 100 light years from Earth. It has an apparent visual magnitude of 3.22, being readily visible to the naked eye, and has an absolute magnitude of +0.78.

== Characteristics ==
The stellar classification of Alpha Indi is K0 III-IV, meaning that it has exhausted the hydrogen at its core and evolved away from the main sequence, being now halfway between a subgiant and a giant star. It is estimated to be 1.6 billion years old, has 2.15 times the mass of the Sun, but has expanded to 9.9 times the radius of the Sun and irradiates 51 times its luminosity. The effective temperature of its photosphere is 4,900 K, giving it the characteristic orange hue of a K-type star. It may have two nearby M-type companion stars, which are located at least 2,000 AU from the primary.

== Nomenclature ==
Alpha Indi (Latinized from α Indi, abbreviated α Ind) is the star's Bayer designation. This star is occasionally called "the Persian", after the Chinese name of its constellation, 波斯 (Bō Sī, English: Persia), which was introduced by Jesuit missionaries (see Indus in Chinese astronomy). The Chinese name of α Indi itself is 波斯二 (Bō Sī èr, English: the Second Star of Persia). In R. H. Allen's 1899 book Star Names, this Chinese name was transliterated as Pe Sze.

α Indi and α Pavonis (Peacock) formed the Arabic asterism al-ṣuradān (الصردان), the Two Shrikes, located behind the Domed Tent (al-qubba القبة, Corona Australis).
