= Zeta Indi =

Star in the constellation Indus

- Location of ζ Indi (circled)

Observation data Epoch J2000 Equinox ICRS
- Constellation: Indus
- Right ascension: 20^{h} 49^{m} 28.96257^{s}
- Declination: −46° 13′ 36.5771″
- Apparent magnitude (V): 4.90

Characteristics
- Evolutionary stage: red giant branch
- Spectral type: K5III
- B−V color index: +1.494±0.059

Astrometry
Radial velocity (R_{v})	−5.20±2.8 km/s
Proper motion (μ)	RA: +39.432 mas/yr Dec.: +26.204 mas/yr
Parallax (π)	7.2497±0.1200 mas
Distance	450 ± 7 ly (138 ± 2 pc)
Absolute magnitude (M_{V})	−0.61

Details
Mass	4.4 M_{☉}
Radius	39 R_{☉}
Luminosity	635 L_{☉}
Surface gravity (log g)	1.93 cgs
Temperature	4,795 K

Other designations
- ζ Ind, CD−46°13718, FK5 3661, GC 29008, HD 198048, HIP 102790, HR 7952, SAO 230391

Database references
SIMBAD	data

Zeta Indi is a single star in the southern constellation Indus, near the northern constellation border with Microscopium. It is visible to the naked eye as a faint, orange-hued star with an apparent visual magnitude of 4.90. The star is located approximately 450 light years away from the Sun based on parallax. The radial velocity estimate for this object is poorly constrained, but it appears to be moving closer at the rate of around −5 km/s.

This object is an aging giant star with a stellar classification of K5III. With the supply of hydrogen at its core exhausted, the star has expanded off the main sequence and now has 39 times the girth of the Sun. It is radiating 635 times the luminosity of the Sun from its bloated photosphere at an effective temperature of 4,795 K.
