= Beta Indi =

Star in the constellation Indus

- Location of β Indi (circled in red)

Observation data Epoch J2000.0 Equinox J2000.0 (ICRS)
- Constellation: Indus
- Right ascension: 20^{h} 54^{m} 48.60278^{s}
- Declination: −58° 27′ 14.9618″
- Apparent magnitude (V): 3.67

Characteristics
- Spectral type: K1II or K0III
- U−B color index: +1.23
- B−V color index: +1.250±0.015

Astrometry
Radial velocity (R_{v})	−4.9±0.7 km/s
Proper motion (μ)	RA: 21.06 mas/yr Dec.: −24.75 mas/yr
Parallax (π)	5.41±0.73 mas
Distance	approx. 600 ly (approx. 180 pc)
Absolute magnitude (M_{V})	−2.664

Details
Mass	6.7±0.4 M_{☉}
Radius	55.58+9.35 −5.02 R_{☉}
Luminosity	1,183±58 L_{☉}
Surface gravity (log g)	0.800 cgs
Temperature	4,541+220 −334 K
Metallicity [Fe/H]	−0.06 dex
Age	53.2±10.0 Myr

Other designations
- B 2847A, β Ind, CPD−58°7788, FK5 785, HD 198700, HIP 103227, HR 7986, SAO 246784, WDS 20548-5827A

Database references
SIMBAD	data

Beta Indi, Latinized from β Indi, is the second brightest star in the southern constellation of Indus. It is visible to the naked eye as a faint, orange-hued point of light with an apparent visual magnitude of 3.67. The star is located approximately 600 light years from the Sun, based on parallax, but is drifting closer with a radial velocity of −5 km/s.

The stellar classification of this star is K1II, matching an evolved bright giant. Earlier it had been categorized as an ordinary giant with a class of K0III. It is a hybrid giant with both a hot stellar corona and cool stellar winds, and is a weak X-ray source with a flux measured at (11±1)×10^{−14} ergs cm^{−1} s^{−1}. Having consumed the supply of hydrogen at its core, this star has expanded off the main sequence and now has about 56 times the girth of the Sun. It is 53 million years old with 6.7 times the mass of the Sun. The star is radiating 1,183 times the Sun's luminosity from its enlarged photosphere at an effective temperature of 4,541 K.

β Indi has a visual companion, CCDM J20548-5827B, with an apparent visual magnitude of approximately 12.5. As of 2015, it lies at an angular separation of 17.2″ along a position angle of 100° from the brighter component.
