= Delta Indi =

Star in the constellation Indus

- Location of δ Indi (circled in red)

Observation data Epoch J2000.0 Equinox J2000.0 (ICRS)
- Constellation: Indus
- Right ascension: 21^{h} 57^{m} 55.07353^{s}
- Declination: −54° 59′ 33.2740″
- Apparent magnitude (V): +4.40 (4.80 + 5.96)

Characteristics
- Spectral type: A5 IV + F0 IV
- U−B color index: +0.10
- B−V color index: +0.28

Astrometry
Proper motion (μ)	RA: +41.94 mas/yr Dec.: −3.93 mas/yr
Parallax (π)	21.77±0.34 mas
Distance	150 ± 2 ly (45.9 ± 0.7 pc)
Absolute magnitude (M_{V})	+0.60

Orbit
Period (P)	12.156±0.090 yr
Semi-major axis (a)	0.173±0.002″
Eccentricity (e)	0.005±0.003
Inclination (i)	75.2±0.5°
Longitude of the node (Ω)	95.0±0.5°
Periastron epoch (T)	B 2030.764±1.205
Argument of periastron (ω) (secondary)	34.2±10.8°

Details

δ Ind A
Mass	1.83±0.04 M_{☉}
Luminosity	48 L_{☉}
Surface gravity (log g)	3.85 cgs
Temperature	7,445±253 K
Metallicity [Fe/H]	−0.21 dex
Rotational velocity (v sin i)	130 km/s
Age	462 Myr

δ Ind B
Mass	1.57±0.04 M_{☉}

Other designations
- δ Ind, CPD−55°9733, FK5 824, HD 208450, HIP 108431, HR 8368, SAO 247244, WDS J21579-5500AB

Database references
SIMBAD	data

Delta Indi, Latinized from δ Indi, is a binary star system in the southern constellation of Indus. It is visible to the naked eye with a combined apparent visual magnitude of +4.40. The brighter primary, designated component A, is magnitude 4.80 while the companion, component B, is magnitude 5.96. Based upon an annual parallax shift of 17.34 mas as measured from Earth, the system is located about 188 light years from the Sun.

The binary nature of this system was discovered by South African astronomer William Stephen Finsen from 1936 onward, with his published orbital elements appearing in 1956. The pair have an orbital period of 12.16 years, a semimajor axis of 0.173 arc seconds, and an eccentricity of around 0.005. They have been listed with a stellar classification of F0 IV by multiple authors, suggesting they are yellow-white hued F-type subgiant stars. However, their estimated masses do not match this classification, so Docobo and Andrade (2013) suggest the Hipparcos parallax may have been underestimated. One paper has published separate spectral classes of A8(V) and F3(V) respectively for the two components. A more recent publication suggests spectral types of A5IV + F0IV.
