= Theta Indi =

Star in the constellation Indus

θ Indi
- Location of θ Indi (circled)

Observation data Epoch J2000 Equinox ICRS
- Constellation: Indus
- Right ascension: 21^{h} 19^{m} 51.9895^{s}
- Declination: −53° 26′ 57.934″
- Apparent magnitude (V): +4.39

Characteristics
- Spectral type: A5IV-V
- B−V color index: +0.191±0.004

Astrometry
Radial velocity (R_{v})	−14.50 km/s
Proper motion (μ)	RA: +106.99 mas/yr Dec.: −66.46 mas/yr
Parallax (π)	33.0546±0.0948 mas
Distance	98.7 ± 0.3 ly (30.25 ± 0.09 pc)
Absolute magnitude (M_{V})	+1.98

Details

A
Mass	1.774±0.040 M_{☉}
Radius	1.736±0.062 R_{☉}
Luminosity	11.9±0.7 L_{☉}
Surface gravity (log g)	4.208±0.032 cgs
Temperature	8,133±70 K
Metallicity [Fe/H]	+0.08 dex
Rotational velocity (v sin i)	135 km/s
Age	617±179 Myr

Ba
Mass	1.08 M_{☉}

Bb
Mass	0.53 M_{☉}

Other designations
- CPD−53°10037, GC 29819, HIP 105319, HR 8140, HD 202730, SAO 246965, WDS J21199-5327AB

Database references
SIMBAD	data

Theta Indi (θ Ind) is a binary star in the constellation Indus. Its apparent magnitude is +4.39 and it is approximately 98.7 light years away based on parallax.

The smaller companion, B, has a spectral type of G0V (yellow main-sequence) and an apparent magnitude of 7.18 at a separation of 6.71″. It is a binary system itself with an orbital period of 30 years. Its components have masses of 1.08 and 0.54 M_{☉}.

Interferometric observations suggest the primary is itself a binary with components Aa and Ab orbiting at 0.0617″, estimated period about 1.3 years, although the star does not exhibit the radial velocity variations and astrometric anomalies expected for such a companion.
