= Indus (constellation) =

Constellation in the southern celestial hemisphere

- Constellation
- List of stars in Indus
- Abbreviation: Ind
- Genitive: Indi
- Pronunciation: /ˈɪndʊs/, genitive /ˈɪndaɪ/
- Symbolism: the Indian
- Right ascension: 20^{h} 28^{m} 40.6308^{s}–23^{h} 27^{m} 59.4799^{s}
- Declination: −44.9588585°–−74.4544678°
- Quadrant: SQ4
- Area: 294 sq. deg. (49th)
- Main stars: 3
- Bayer/Flamsteed stars: 16
- Stars brighter than 3.00^{m}: 0
- Stars within 10.00 pc (32.62 ly): 2
- Brightest star: α Ind (3.11^{m})
- Nearest star: ε Ind
- Messier objects: none
- Meteor showers: none
- Bordering constellations: Microscopium; Sagittarius (corner); Telescopium; Pavo; Octans; Tucana; Grus
- Visible at latitudes between +15° and −90°. Best visible at 21:00 (9 p.m.) during the month of September.

Indus is a constellation in the southern sky first professionally surveyed by Europeans in the 1590s and mapped on a globe by Jodocus Hondius and Petrus Plancius by early 1598. It was included on a plate illustrating southern constellations in Bayer's sky atlas Uranometria in 1603. It lies well south of the Tropic of Capricorn, but its triangular shape can be seen for most of the year from the Equator. It is elongated from north to south and has a complex boundary. The English translation of its name is given as the Indian, apparently representing an inhabitant of Madgascar or the East Indies, sites visited by the observers who first recorded the constellation's stars.

== Features ==
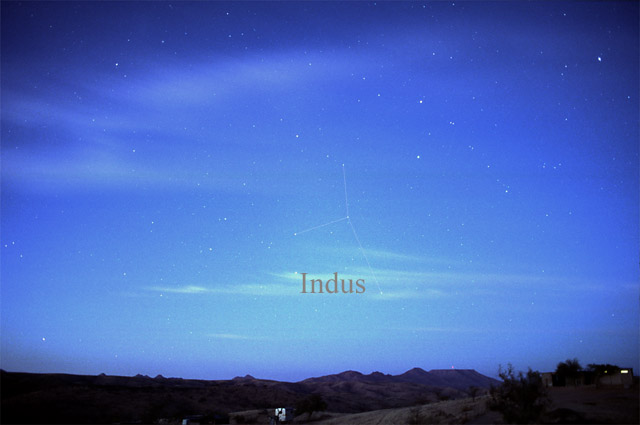
The constellation Indus as it can be seen by the naked eye.

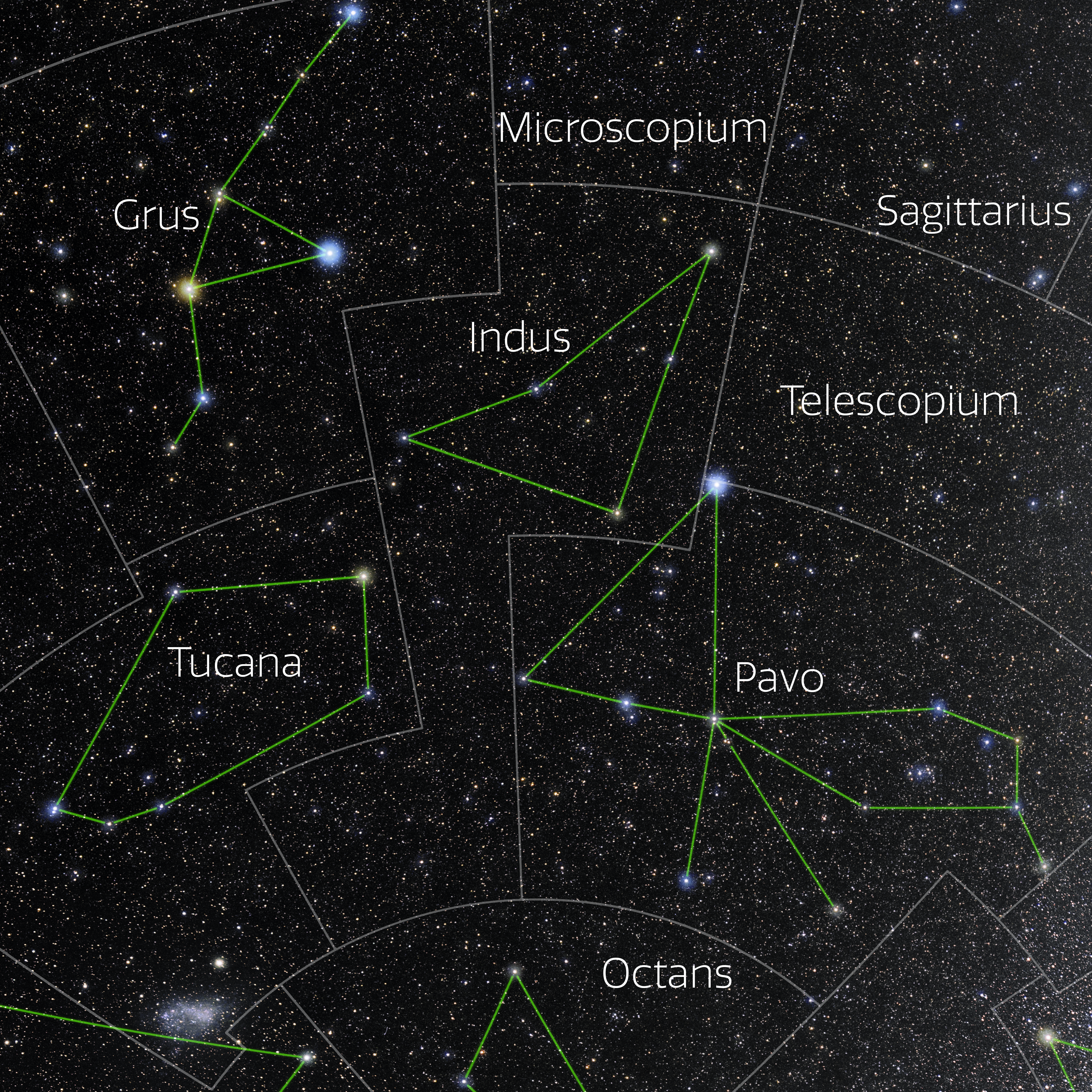
Indus and neighboring IAU constellations (photograph by Eckhard Slawik, NOIRLab's 88 Constellations project)

Indus lacks stars among the sky's brightest 100 stars in apparent magnitude. Its brightest stars are two of third magnitude and three of fourth magnitude.

=== Stars ===
Lacaille gave 18 stars Bayer designations Alpha through Rho in 1756, but omitted Xi, and labelled two stars as Kappa and Lambda. Lambda Indi (Lambda^{1} and Lambda^{2}) were included in Pavo and the designations are no longer used. In 1879, Benjamin Gould renamed Nu Indi as Nu Microscopii as it turns out that it was situated into Microscopium and renamed as such, though today's Nu Indi now refers to HD 211988.

Alpha Indi, its brightest, is an orange giant of magnitude 3.1, 101 light-years away. Beta Indi is an orange giant of magnitude 3.7, 600 light-years distant. Delta Indi is a white star of magnitude 4.4, 185 light-years from Earth. The three form a near-perfect right-angled triangle, such that Beta marks the right angle and is in the south-east.

Epsilon Indi is one of the closest stars to Earth, approximately 11.8 light years away. It is an orange dwarf of magnitude 4.7, meaning that the yellow dwarf Sun is slightly hotter and larger. The system has been discovered to contain a pair of binary brown dwarfs, and has long been a prime candidate in SETI studies. This star has the third-highest proper motion of all visible to the unaided eye, as ranks behind Groombridge 1830 and 61 Cygni, and the ninth-highest overall. This will move the star into Tucana around 2640. It figures directly between Alpha and Beta.

Indus is home to one bright binary star. Theta Indi is a binary star divisible in small amateur telescopes, 97 light-years from Earth. Its primary is a white star of magnitude 4.5 and its secondary is a white star of magnitude 7.0. It figures close to the hypotenuse of the right-angled triangle of Alpha, Beta and Delta, the three brightest stars of Indus.

=== Variable stars ===
T Indi is the only bright variable star in Indus. It is a semi-regular, deeply coloured red giant with a period of 11 months, 1900 light-years away. Its minimum magnitude is 7 and its maximum: 5.

=== Galaxies ===
Galaxies include NGC 7038, NGC 7049, and NGC 7090. IC 5152 is a dwarf irregular galaxy lying at a distance of about 1.7 million parsec (5.5 million light years), at the edge of the Local Group, although it is not a certain member.

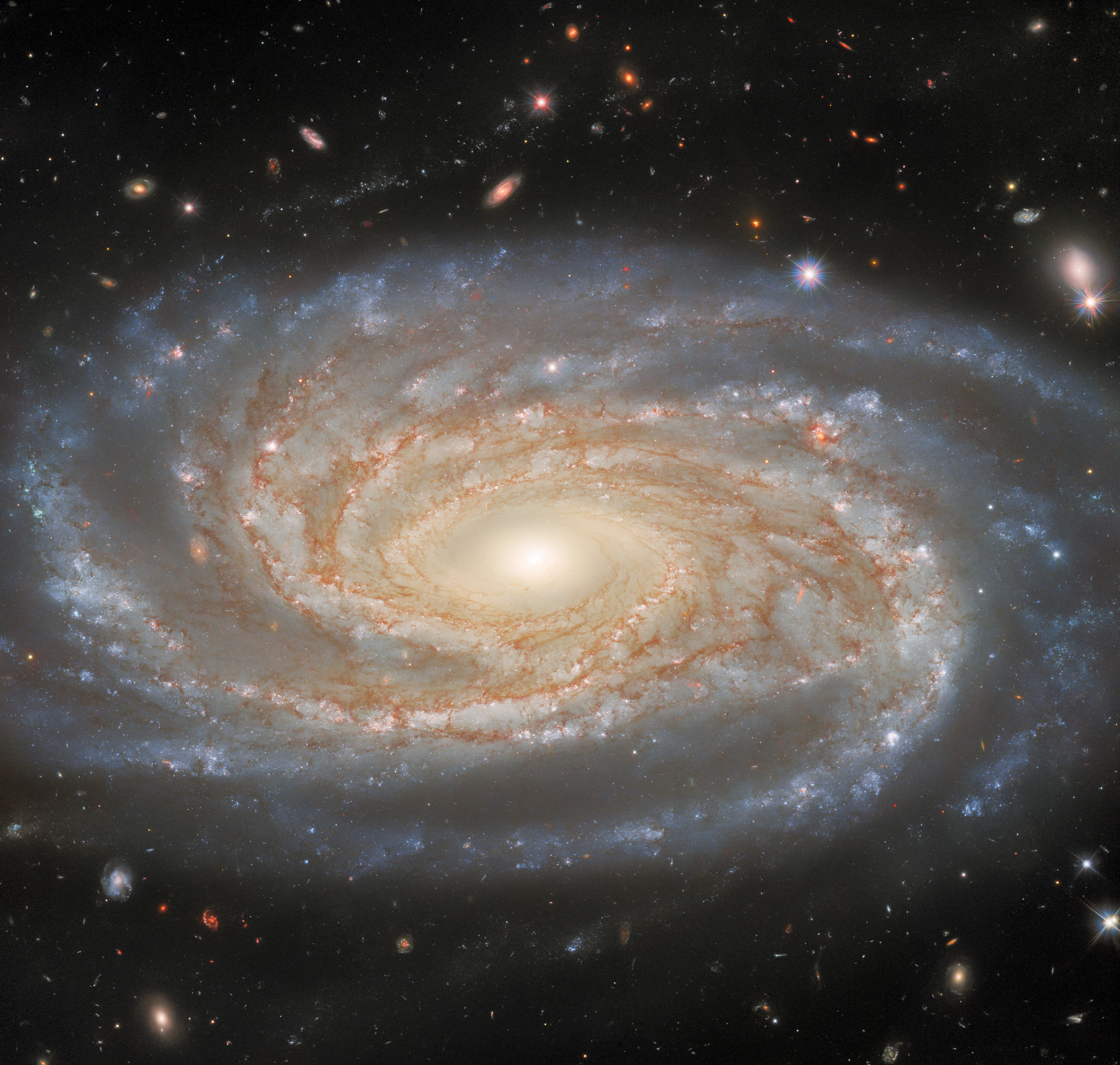
The spiral galaxy NGC 7038 (Hubble Space Telescope)

=== Supernovae ===
All Sky Automated Survey for SuperNovae (ASAS-SN) in 2015 detected a superluminous supernova, named ASASSN-15lh (also designated SN 2015L). Based on the study conducted by Subo Dong and team from the Kavli Institute for Astronomy and Astrophysics (KIAA) at Peking University, it was approximately doubly luminous to any supernova detected, and at peak was almost 50 times more intrinsically luminous than the Milky Way. Its distance is approximately 3.82 gigalight-years, denoting an age approximately half that of the universe.

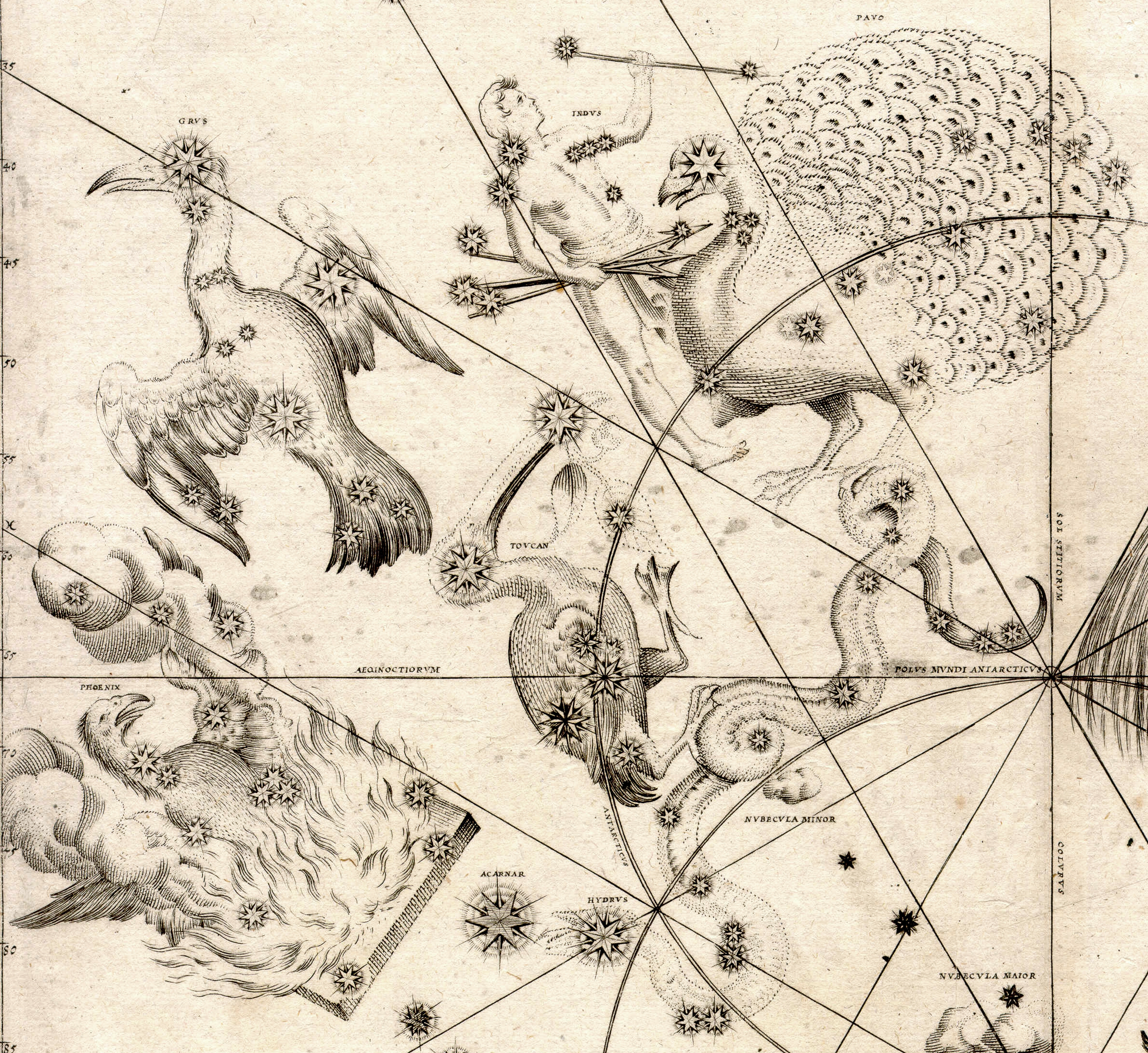
Indus (top middle) on Chart 49 of Johann Bayer's Uranometria, its first appearance in a celestial atlas.

== History ==
The constellation was first illustrated by Petrus Plancius, who made a fairly large celestial globe from the observations of Pieter Dirkszoon Keyser and Frederick de Houtman. The first depiction of this constellation in a celestial atlas followed in Johann Bayer's Uranometria of 1603. Plancius portrayed the figure as a nude male with three arrows in one hand and one in the other, as a native, lacking quiver and bow. It is among the twelve constellations introduced by Keyser and de Houtman, which first appeared on Plancius's celestial globe in 1598.

== See also ==
- IAU-recognized constellations
- Indus (Chinese astronomy)

== Sources ==
- "Indus". The Constellations. International Astronomical Union. Archived from the original on 2013-06-04.
- Ridpath, Ian; Tirion, Wil (2001), Stars and Planets Guide, Princeton University Press, ISBN 0-691-08913-2
- Ian Ridpath and Wil Tirion (2007). Stars and Planets Guide, Collins, London. ISBN 978-0-00-725120-9. Princeton University Press, Princeton. ISBN 978-0-691-13556-4.
