= Southern Supercluster Strand =

Galaxy filament

Observation data (Epoch )
- Parent structure: Laniakea Supercluster

Other designations
- Southern Supercluster strand, Southern Supercluster filament

The Southern Supercluster Strand is a galaxy filament that encompasses the Southern Supercluster and the Telescopium−Grus Cloud.

In 2014, it was announced that the Southern Supercluster Strand is a lobe in a greater supercluster, Laniakea, that is centered on the Great Attractor. This would mean that the Southern Supercluster Strand's components, the Telescopium−Grus Cloud and the Southern Supercluster would be part of this new supercluster. The Virgo Supercluster would also be part of this greater supercluster, thus becoming the local supercluster.

== Physical characteristics ==
The Southern Supercluster Strand is a galaxy filament that emerges from the Centaurus Cluster. The filament then branches off into two forks, SSCa, and SSCb, also known as the Southern Supercluster and the Telescopium−Grus Cloud respectively. The Southern Supercluster is a long major chain of galaxies, consisting of the major Dorado, Fornax, and Eridanus clusters while the Telescopium−Grus Cloud is a low density galaxy filament, with no central concentration of galaxies. The Telescopium−Grus Cloud along with the Pavo-Indus Supercluster form parts of a wall bounding the Local Void. Likewise, both structures along with the Southern Supercluster also form a wall bounding the Sculptor Void. The Southern Supercluster Srand extends all the way to the Perseus–Pisces Supercluster. The Southern Supercluster Strand, along with the Centaurus–Puppis–PP filament, which contains the Antila Wall and both extend to the Perseus–Pisces Supercluster, form a wall bounding the Sculptor Void.

=== Cetus-Aries Cloud ===
The Cetus-Aries Cloud, is a minor filament that was identified and described in 1987 by astronomer Brent Tully with colleague Richard Fisher in his book The Nearby Galaxies Atlas, and connects the Southern Supercluster (though the Dorado Group) with the Telescopium−Grus Cloud.

==== List of Groups ====
Below is a list of groups in the Cetus-Aries Cloud according to astronomer Brent Tully.

Column 1: The name of the group in Tully's NBGC
Column 2: The right ascension for epoch 2000.
Column 3: The declination for epoch 2000.
Column 4: Number of members of the group.
Column 5: Brightest member of the group
Column 6: Redshift of the group.
Column 7: Distance of the group (Millions of light-years).
Column 8: Cross-Identifications with other catalogs.

(Sources for data columns:)

Groups within the Cetus-Aries Cloud
Name of group	R.A. (J2000)	Dec. (J2000)	Number of members	Brightest member	Redshift	Distance (Mly)	Cross-ID
NBGC 52-1	02h 41m 09.3s	−08d 07m 10s	11 (Tully); 9 (Fourque); 14 (Garcia); 11 (Giuricin)	NGC 1052	0.004939	56	NGC 988 Group, NGC 1052 Group, NGC 1084 Group, LGG 71, NOGG H 175, NOGG P1 162, NOGG P2 165, [FWB89] GrG 207, [HG82] 44
NBGC 52-2	02h 42m 40.7s	−00d 00m 48s	8 (Tully); 6 (Fourque); 6 (Garcia); 5 (Giuricin)	NGC 1068	0.003773	40	NGC 1068 Group, M77 Group, LGG 73, NOGG H 178, NOGG P1 165, NOGG P2 168 [HG82] 48, [GH83] 032, [TSK2008] 0890
NBGC 52-3	02h 28m 26.1s	−01d 29m 16s	5 (Tully); 4 (Fourque); 7 (Garcia); 2/6 (Giuricin)	NGC 936	0.004873	54	NGC 936 Group, LGG 60, NOGG H 160, NOGG P1 147, NOGG P2 151 [TSK2008] 0891, [GH83] 028
NBGC 52-4	02h 46m 25.1s	−00d 29m 55s	3 (Tully); 2 (Giuricin)	NGC 1087	0.005080	62	NGC 1087 Group, NOGG H 182
NBGC 52-5	01h 59m 42.3s	−05d 57m 47s	2 (Tully); 2 (Giuricin)	NGC 779	0.004640	56	NGC 779 Group, NOGG H 126, NOGG P1 111, NOGG P2 115
NBGC 52-6	02h 22m 14.9s	−21d 00m 04s	6 (Tully); 6 (Fourque); 8 (Garcia); 6 (Giuricin)	NGC 908	0.005019	61	NGC 908 Group LGG 56 NOGG H 158, NOGG P1 145, NOGG P2 148 [MdL89] 83, SSRS GROUP 83
NBGC 52-7	01h 33m 21.4s	−07d 01m 17s	6 (Tully); 8 (Fourque); 8 (Garcia); 9 (Giuricin)	NGC 584	0.006004	67	NGC 584 Group, Cetus Group, LGG 27, NOGG H 83, NOGG P1 71, NOGG P2 75, [HG82] 45, [TSK2008] 0895
NBGC 52-8	01h 49m 49.7s	−10d 03m 05s	3 (Tully); 3 (Fourque); 3 (Garcia); 2/3 (Giuricin)	NGC 681	0.006158	70	NGC 681 Group, LGG 33, NGC 701 Group, NOGG H 107, NOGG P1 90, NOGG P2 93, [TSK2008] 0896
NBGC 52-9	01h 52m 57.5s	-13d 30m 20s	4 (Tully); 4 (Fourque); 4 (Garcia); 3/6/2 (Giuricin)	NGC 720	0.005871	67	NGC 720 Group, LGG 38, NOGG H 103, NOGG P1 98, NOGG P2 103
NBGC 52-10	02h 15m 27.6s	06d 00m 09s	2 (Tully); 3 (Fourque); 5 (Garcia); 2 (Giuricin)	NGC 864	0.005210	67	NGC 864 Group, NOGG H 150
NBGC 52-11	01h 50m 54s	05d 24m 02s	2 (Tully); 3 (Fourque); 3/2 (Giuricin)	NGC 676	0.004807	52	NGC 676 Group NOGG H 108, NOGG P1 92, NOGG P2 95,
NBGC 52-12	01h 21m 18.8s	03d 31m 51s	6 (Tully); 4 (Fourque); 5 (Garcia); 5 (Giuricin)	NGC 488	0.007812	91	NGC 488 Group, LGG 21, NGC 470 Group, LGG 20 NOGG H 70, NOGG P1 60, NOGG P2 62 G45
NBGC 52-13	01h 31m 10.3s	04d 13m 56s	2 (Tully); 2 (Giuricin)	UGC 1133	0.006561	83	UGC 1133 Group, NOGG H 85, NOGG P1 74, NOGG P2 78
NBGC 52-14	01h 58m 26.7s	18d 45m 50s	3 (Tully); 3 (Garcia); 3 (Giuricin)	NGC 772	0.008029	95	NGC 772 Group, LGG 40, NOGG H 124, NOGG P1 109, NOGG P2 112, [TSK2008] 0915; [M98j] 032
NBGC 52-15	01h 50m 37.0s	21h 54m 14s	2 (Tully); 5 (Fourque); 10 (Garcia); 7 (Giuricin)	NGC 691, NGC 697	0.009762	118	NGC 691 Group, LGG 34, NGC 697 Group, NOGG H 109, NOGG P1 95, NOGG P2 99, HIPASS J0150+21, [GH83] 020

== Observational history ==
Before the Southern Supercluster Strand was identified, its two major components were already known: the Southern Supercluster which was discovered in 1953 by astronomer Gérard de Vaucouleurs, and the Telescopium−Grus Cloud which was discovered by astronomer Brent Tully with colleague Richard Fisher in 1987.

In 1987, astronomer Brent Tully with colleague Richard Fisher discovered and described the Cetus-Aries Cloud, a minor filament that connects the Southern Supercluster with the Telescopium−Grus Cloud. In 1992, Fouque et al. grouped the Cetus-Aries Cloud, also known as cloud 52 in the book The Nearby Galaxies Atlas along with the Southern Supercluster's three major clusters, the Fornax, Eridanus, and Dorado clusters (clouds 51 and 53).

In 2013, Courtois et al. discovered based on the distribution of galaxies inferred from their redshifts the Southern Supercluster Strand, which branches off into two forks that emerge from the Centaurus Cluster. These two forks were designated SSCa and SSCb, also known as the Southern Supercluster and the Telescopium−Grus Cloud. In 2017, Pomarède et al. revealed that the Southern Supercluster strand along with another filament known as the Antlia Strand, extend all the way to the Perseus–Pisces Supercluster.

== See also ==
- Large-scale structure of the universe
