= Telescopium−Grus Cloud =

Galaxy filament in the constellations Pavo, Indus and Telescopium

Observation data (Epoch )
- Parent structure: Southern Supercluster Strand

Other designations
- SSCb

The Telescopium−Grus Cloud is a galaxy filament in the constellations of Pavo, Indus, and Telescopium. It was first defined by astronomer Brent Tully in his book The Nearby Galaxies Atlas and its companion book The Nearby Galaxies Catalog.

In 2014, it was announced that the Southern Supercluster Strand is a lobe in a greater supercluster, Laniakea, that is centered on the Great Attractor. This would mean that the Southern Supercluster Strand's components, the Telescopium−Grus Cloud and the Southern Supercluster would be part of this new supercluster. The Virgo Supercluster would also be part of this greater supercluster, thus becoming the local supercluster.

== Physical characteristics ==
The Telescopium−Grus Cloud is a collection of at least 24 galaxy groups. It is low density galaxy filament, with no central concentration of galaxies. The filament along with the Pavo–Indus Supercluster form parts of a wall bounding the Local Void. Likewise, both structures also form a wall bounding the Sculptor Void.

The Telescopium−Grus Cloud is a branch of a larger filament extending from the Centaurus Cluster that is known as the Southern Supercluster Strand which also encompasses the Fornax–Eridanus–Dorado complex which is also known as the Southern Supercluster. The Southern Supercluster Srand extends all the way to the Perseus–Pisces Supercluster. The Telescopium−Grus Cloud which is part of the Southern Supercluster Strand, along with the Centaurus–Puppis–PP filament, which contains the Antila Wall and both extend to the Perseus–Pisces Supercluster, form a wall bounding the Sculptor Void.

== Observational history ==
Even before the Telescopium−Grus Cloud was identified, major concentrations in the filament were identified: group G27 which would later be known as the Grus Group, group G39 which would later be known as the NGC 134 Group, group G45 (Pavo-Indus) which would later be known as the NGC 7079, NGC 7144, NGC 7196 and NGC 7213 groups, and group G52 which would later be known as the Telescopium Cluster. These concentrations were first identified by astronomer Gérard de Vaucouleurs in 1975.

In 1987, astronomer Brent Tully with colleague Richard Fisher first identified and described the Telescopium−Grus Cloud in his book The Nearby Galaxies Atlas and its companion book The Nearby Galaxies Catalog. Later in 1992, Fouque et al. grouped the Telescopium−Grus Cloud, also known as cloud 61 in the book The Nearby Galaxies Atlas along with the Pavo-Indus Spur (cloud 62), the Pisces Austrinus Spur (cloud 63), the Pegasus Cloud and Pegasus Spur (clouds 64 and 65) with the Pavo-Indus Supercluster which at the time was known as the Indus Supercluster. However in a paper published in 1993 titled, Dynamics of the Pavo–Indus and Grus clouds of galaxies., Fouque et al. instead classified the Telescopium−Grus Cloud as a connection between the Pavo–Indus Supercluster and the Local Supercluster.

In 2001, Pebeles et.al identified another galaxy filament that originates at the Virgo Cluster, passes through a knot of galaxies containing the Sombrero Galaxy, then passes at its closest point to the Milky Way at the Centaurus/M83 group, and then passes from the perspective from the Milky Way through the galactic plane near the Circinus Galaxy to meet up with the Telescopium−Grus Cloud. In 2013, Courtois et al. identified a filament extending from the Centaurus Cluster that is associated with a structure identified in 1956 by Gérard de Vaucouleurs: The Southern Supercluster. The Southern Supercluster contains 3 major concentrations of galaxies: The Fornax Cluster, The Dorado Group and Eridanus cluster, along with many other groups of galaxies. The Telescopium−Grus Cloud would now be considered a branch of this larger filament along with the Southern Supercluster which is also known as the Fornax–Eridanus–Dorado complex. The Telescopium−Grus Cloud would be designated as branch SSCb of this filament, and the Southern Supercluster would be designated as branch SSCa. In 2017, Pomarède et al. revealed that this filament, now known as the Southern Supercluster strand along with another filament known as the Antila Strand, extend all the way to the Perseus–Pisces Supercluster.

== List of groups ==
Below is a list of groups in the Telescopium–Grus Cloud according to astronomer Brent Tully.

Column 1: The name of the group in Tully's NBGG
Column 2: The right ascension for epoch 2000.
Column 3: The declination for epoch 2000.
Column 4: Number of members of the group.
Column 5: Brightest member of the group
Column 6: Redshift of the group.
Column 7: Distance of the group (Millions of light-years).
Column 8: Cross-Identifications with other catalogs.

(Sources for data columns:)

Groups within the Telescopium-Grus Cloud
| Name of group | R.A. (J2000) | Dec. (J2000) | Number of members | Brightest member | Redshift | Distance (Mly) | Cross-ID |
|---|---|---|---|---|---|---|---|
| NBGC 61-1 | 20h 09m 39.6s | −48d 19m 39s | 5 (Tully); 6/15 (Fourque); 11 (Garcia); 6/7/10 (Giuricin) | NGC 6868 | 0.008573 | 91 | NGC 6868 Group, Telescopium Cluster, Telescopium Group, Abell S0851, LGG 430, MCXC J2009.9-4823, NOGG H 932, NOGG P1 949, NOGG P2 962, RXC J2009.9-4823, SSRS GROUP 28, Sersic 135/05, [HG82] 09, [MdL89] 28, [TSK2008] 1049, G52 |
| NBGC 61-2 | 20h 24m 14s | −43d 44m 24s | 3 (Tully); 3 (Garcia); 3 (Giuricin) | NGC 6902 | 0.009603 | 121 | NGC 6902 Group, LGG 434, NOGG H 947, NOGG P1 962, NOGG P2 975 SSRS GROUP 37, [MdL89] 37, [TSK2008] 1050 |
| NBGC 61-3 | 20h 44m 40.2s | −45d 58m 43s | 2 (Tully) | ESO 285-48 | 0.009073 | 113 | |
| NBGC 61-4 | 18h 56m 10.0s | −54d 07m 17s | 5 (Tully); 12 (Fourque); 11 (Garcia); 30/26/27 (Giuricin) | IC 4797, IC 4837A | 0.009086 | 119 | NGC 6753 Cluster, IC 4797 Group, LGG 425, LGG 426, IC 4837A Group, NOGG H 910, NOGG P1 916, NOGG P1 925, NOGG P2 933, NOGG P2 940, NGC 6753 GROUP NED01, AM 1852-542, HDCE 1051, Sersic 130/03, NGC 6753 GROUP NED02, [HG82] 05, [HG82] 04 |
| NBGC 61-5 | 19h 48m 56.3s | −58d 04m 38s | 4 (Tully); 4 (Giuricin) | NGC 6810 | 0.006422 | 82 | NGC 6810 Group, NOGG H 922 |
| NBGC 61-6 | 21h 33m 33.3s | −44d 00m 04s | 3 (Tully); 6/8 (Fourque); 7 (Garcia); 9 (Fourque et.al 1993); 2/6 (Giuricin) | NGC 7079 | 0.008186 | 100 | NGC 7079 Group LGG 446 NOGG H 987, NOGG P1 1003, NOGG P2 1016 [HG82] 11, SSRS GROUP 34, [MdL89] 34 G45 |
| NBGC 61-7 | 22h 06m 31.9s | −50d 03m 27s | 2 (Tully); 3 (Fourque et.al 1993); 2 (Giuricin) | NGC 7196 | 0.009467 | 121 | NGC 7196 Group NOGG H 1012, NOGG P1 1025, NOGG P2 1038 |
| NBGC 61-8 | 22h 10m 56.7s | −46d 04m 53s | 2 (Tully) | IC 5171 | 0.009497 | 120 | |
| NBGC 61-9 | 22h 00m 05.8s | −43d 20m 50s | 3 (Tully); 4 (Fourque); 4 (Garcia); 4 (Fourque et.al 1993); 4 (Giuricin) | ESO 288-025 | 0.007739 | 94 | NGC 7166 Group NGC 7162 Group, LGG 449, NOGG H 1003, NOGG H 1004, NOGG P1 1018, NOGG P2 1031, SSRS GROUP 38; [MdL89] 38, [TSK2008] 1071, G45 |
| NBGC 61-10 | 21h 18m 37.9s | −48d 33m 03s | 2 (Tully); 6 (Garcia); 3 (Fourque et.al 1993); 2/3 (Giuricin) | NGC 7049 | 0.007145 | 84 | NGC 7049 Group, LGG 444 NOGG H 978, NOGG P1 994, NOGG P2 1007, SSRS GROUP 27; [MdL89] 27 |
| NBGC 61-11 | 22h 11m 35.5s | -46d 10m 02s | 6 (Tully); 3/5 (Fourque); 4 (Garcia); 9 (Fourque et.al 1993); 4/8 (Giuricin) | IC 5181, NGC 7213 | 0.006618 | 79 | IC 5181 Group NGC 7232 Group, LGG 455, NGC 7213 Group NOGG H 1017, NOGG P1 1032, NOGG P2 1044, SSRS GROUP 32, [MdL89] 32 G45 |
| NBGC 61-12 | 21h 53m 03.7s | −48d 27m 21s | 3 (Tully); 5 (Fourque); 5 (Garcia); 4 (Fourque et.al 1993); 2/3 (Giuricin) | NGC 7144 | 0.006481 | 78 | NGC 7144 Group, LGG 448, NOGG H 999, NOGG P1 1013, NOGG P2 1026, SSRS GROUP 24, [HG82] 07, [MdL89] 24 GGroup, [TSK2008] 1075, G45 |
| NBGC 61-13 | 22h 08m 34.3s | −57d 26m 33s | 2 (Tully) | NGC 7205 | 0.005623 | 68 | |
| NBGC 61-14 | 22h 45m 19.7s | −39d 32m 20s | 2 (Tully); 3 (Fourque); 3 (Garcia); 3 (Fourque et.al 1993); 2 (Giuricin) | NGC 7368 | 0.07859 | 94 | NGC 7368 Group LGG 461, NOGG H 1039, NOGG P1 1055, NOGG P2 1068, [MdL89] 40 NED01; [TSK2008] 1084, G27 |
| NBGC 61-15 | 22h 57m 13.1s | 36h 21m 48s | 2 (Tully); 4 (Fourque); 3 (Garcia); 3 (Fourque et.al 1993); 3 (Giuricin) | IC 5270 | 0.006565 | 76 | NGC 7421 Group, IC 5264 Group, LGG 465 NOGG H 1045 [MdL89] 40 NED02; [TSK2008] 1085 G27 |
| NBGC 61-16 | 23h 16m 10.9s | −42h 35m 01s | 12 (Tully); 13/19 (Fourque); 13 (Garcia); 11 (Fourque et.al 1993); 13/14 (Giuricin) | NGC 7582 | 0.005661 | 65 | Grus Cloud, Grus Group, Grus Quartet, NGC 7582 Group IC 5267 Group, LGG 464, LGG 472, NOGG H 1060, NOGG P1 1060, NOGG P1 1079, NOGG P2 1073, NOGG P2 1095 HDCE 1220; SSRS GROUP 39; [MdL89] 39, G27 |
| NBGC 61-17 | 22h 57m 16.0s | −36h 25m 24s | 4 (Tully); 8 (Fourque); 5 (Garcia); 11 (Fourque et.al 1993); 5/10 (Giuricin) | IC 1459 | 0.005700 | 64 | IC 1459 Group, LGG 466, LGG 465, NOGG H 1042, NOGG P1 1061, NOGG P2 1074, [HG82] 15, [MdL89] 40 NED03 G27 |
| NBGC 61-18 | 00h 30m 50.0s | −32h 56m 41s | 3 (Tully); 5/9 (Fourque); 7 (Garcia); 5 (Giuricin) | NGC 134 | 0.005217 | 55 | NGC 134 Group, LGG 7, NOGG H 21, NOGG P1 18, NOGG P2 19, SSRS GROUP 60; [MdL89] 60, G39 |
| NBGC 61-19 | 00h 50m 04.9s | −31h 18m 47s | 2 (Tully); 2 (Giuricin) | NGC 289 | 0.005477 | 59 | NGC 289 Group, NOGG H 43, NOGG P1 37, NOGG P2 38 |
| NBGC 61-20 | 00h 34m 15.5s | −27h 48m 13s | 2 (Tully) | NGC 150 | 0.005294 | 61 | |
| NBGC 61-21 | 00h 47m 47.3s | −11h 28m 07s | 3 (Tully) | NGC 255 | 0.005287 | 61 | |
| NBGC 61-22 | 00h 39m 51.6s | −14h 01m 24s | 2 (Tully); 2 (Giuricin) | NGC 210 | 0.005811 | 63 | NGC 210 Group, NOGG H 36, NOGG P1 29, NOGG P2 30 |
| NBGC 61-23 | 00h 55m 41.0s | −07h 20m 18s | 3 (Tully); 4 (Garcia); 4 (Giuricin) | NGC 337 | 0.005624 | 61 | NGC 337 Group, LGG 15, NOGG H 45, NOGG P1 40, NOGG P2 42 |
| NBGC 61-24 | 00h 51m 59.6s | −00h 29m 12s | 2 (Tully) | ARAK 18 | 0.005427 | 64 | |

== See also ==
- Large-scale structure of the universe
