= Southern Supercluster =

Closest neighboring galaxy supercluster

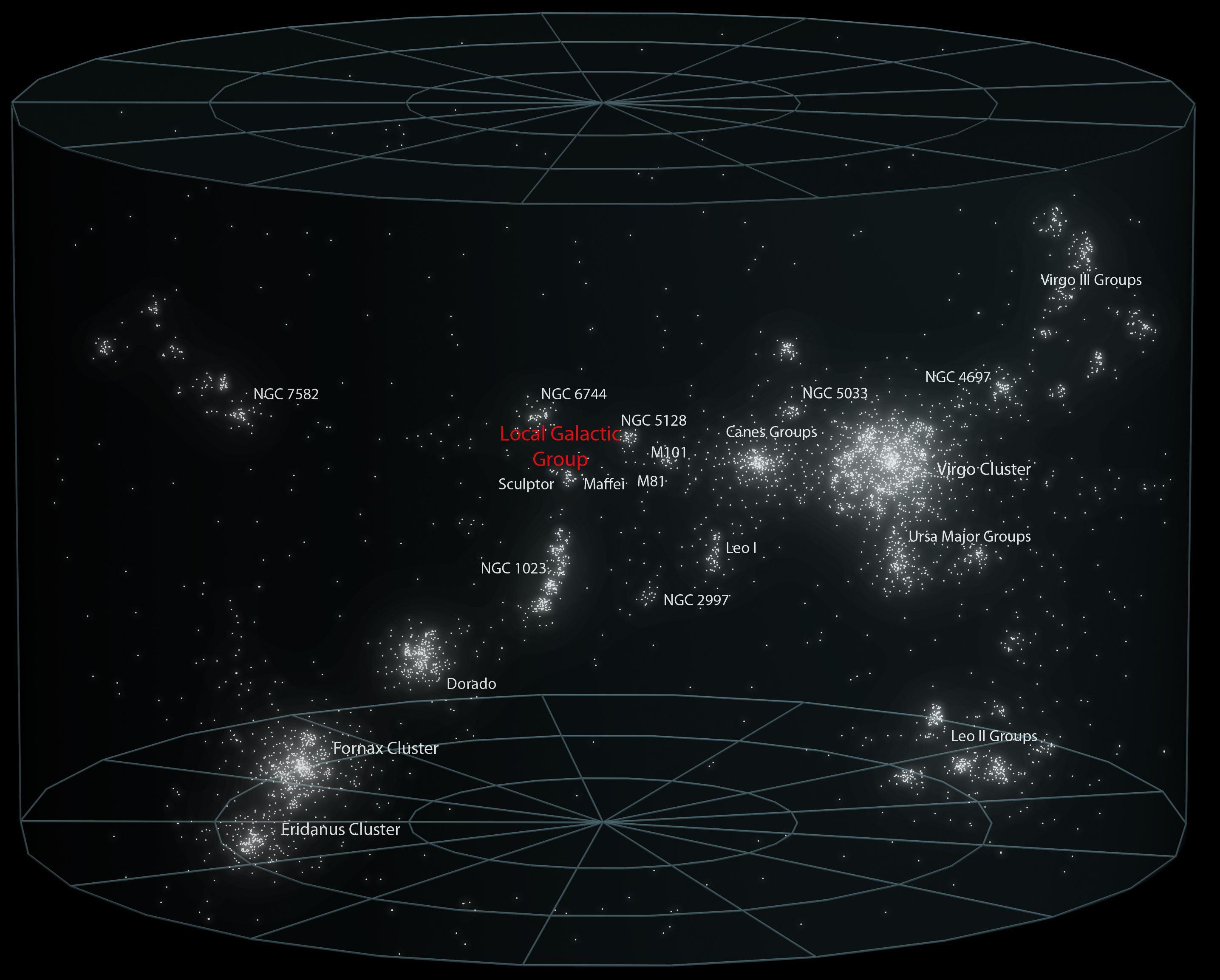
- A map of the local universe centered on the Local Group, showing the main components of the Southern Supercluster (Dorado Group, Fornax and Eridanus Clusters) on the left below alongside a portion of the Virgo Supercluster on the center right.

Observation data (Epoch J2000)
- Constellation(s): Cetus, Fornax, Eridanus, Horologium, and Dorado.
- Parent structure: Southern Supercluster Strand
- Major axis: 41 Mpc (134 Mly)
- Velocity dispersion: 345 km/s
- Redshift: 1800 km/s
- Distance: 19.5 Mpc (63.6 Mly)
- Binding mass: 2.4×10^{14} M_{☉}
- Luminosity (specify): 2.4×10^{12} L_{☉} (total)

Other designations
- Dorado-Fornax-Eridanus complex, Dorado-Fornax-Eridanus stream, Eridanus-Fornax-Dorado filament, SSCa

The Southern Supercluster is a nearby supercluster located around 19.5 Mpc (63.6 Mly) in the constellations of Cetus, Fornax, Eridanus, Horologium, and Dorado. It was first identified in 1953 by Gérard de Vaucouleurs.

The Southern Supercluster contains three main clusters, the Dorado, Fornax, and Eridanus clusters, along with many other groups of galaxies. The three main clusters form what is sometimes referred to as the Fornax Wall.

In 2014, it was announced that the Southern Supercluster Strand is a lobe in a greater supercluster, Laniakea, that is centered on the Great Attractor. This would mean that the Southern Supercluster Strand's components, the Southern Supercluster and the Telescopium−Grus Cloud would be part of this new supercluster. The Virgo Supercluster would also be part of this greater supercluster, thus becoming the local supercluster.

== Physical characteristics ==
The Southern Supercluster is a long, 41 Mpc (134 Mly) chain of at least 15 to 33 groups and clusters of galaxies that runs though the Dorado, Fornax, and Eridanus clusters. The supercluster consists of two segments: Region A and Region B.

Segment	Width	Thickness	Distance	Redshift	Notes
Region A	3 Mpc (10 Mly)	20 Mpc (65 Mly)	19 Mpc (62 Mly)	1161 km/s	Also known as Fornax Wall, which is the richest part of the supercluster. Almost parallel to the supergalactic plane.
Region B	13 Mpc (42 Mly)	26 Mpc (85 Mly)	22 Mpc (72 Mly)	1403 km/s	Perpendicular to the supergalactic plane.

The Southern Supercluster (though the Dorado Group) connects to the Telescopium−Grus Cloud through the Cetus-Aries Cloud, a minor filament that was identified and described in 1987 by astronomer Brent Tully with colleague Richard Fisher in his book The Nearby Galaxies Atlas.

The Southern Supercluster is a branch of a larger filament extending from the Centaurus Cluster that is known as the Southern Supercluster Strand which also encompasses the Telescopium−Grus Cloud. The Southern Supercluster Srand extends all the way to the Perseus–Pisces Supercluster. The Southern Supercluster which is part of the Southern Supercluster Strand, along with the Centaurus–Puppis–PP filament, which contains the Antila Wall and both extend to the Perseus–Pisces Supercluster, form a wall bounding the Sculptor Void.

== Observational history ==
In 1847, John Herschel had pointed out the existence of a stream of galaxies, or nebulae as they were known at the time, in the constellations of Cetus, Fornax, Eridanus, Horologium, and Dorado. In 1953 Gérard de Vaucouleurs recognized this band as a supercluster, and dubbed it the "southern supergalaxy"; many of the groups and clusters had been identified by around 1975.

In 1987, astronomer Brent Tully with colleague Richard Fisher identified in his book The Nearby Galaxies Atlas the Cetus-Aries Cloud, a nearby minor filament that was described as a connection between the Southern Supercluster and the Telescopium−Grus Cloud, another filament that was identified by the same authors that year. In 1989, Mitra et al. first described the physical structure of the Southern Supercluster based on the distribution of galaxies inferred from their redshifts, and suspected that a filament connected the Southern Supercluster Strand with the Perseus–Pisces Supercluster. This was later confirmed in 2017 by Pomarède et al. In 1992, Fouque et al. grouped the Cetus-Aries Cloud, also known as Cloud 52 and the Antlia Cloud (Cloud 54) in the book The Nearby Galaxies Atlas, along with the Southern Supercluster's three major clusters, the Fornax, Eridanus, and Dorado clusters (clouds 51 and 53). However, Brent Tully considers the Antlia Cloud to be part of the Virgo Supercluster.

In 2013, Courtois et al. identified a filament extending from the Centaurus Cluster that encompasses the Southern Supercluster, dubbed the Southern Supercluster Strand. The Southern Supercluster would now be considered a branch of this larger filament along with the Telescopium−Grus Cloud. The Southern Supercluster would be designated as branch SSCa of this filament, and the Telescopium−Grus Cloud would be designated as branch SSCb. In 2017, Pomarède et al. revealed that this filament, now known as the Southern Supercluster strand along with another filament known as the Antila Strand, extends all the way to the Perseus–Pisces Supercluster.

== See also ==
- Large-scale structure of the universe
