= Pavo–Indus Supercluster =

Neighboring supercluster in the constellations Pavo, Indus and Telescopium

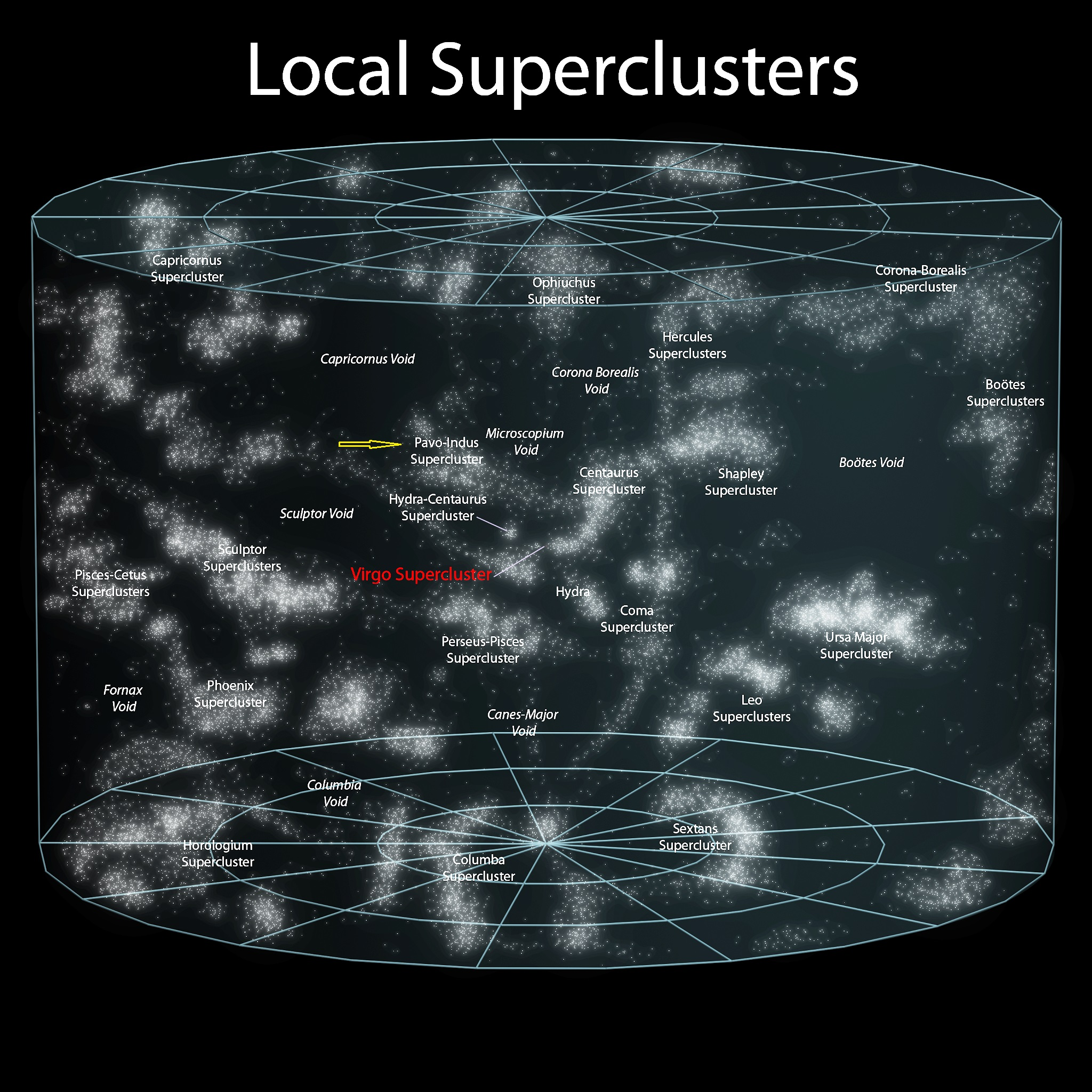
- Location of the Pavo-Indus Supercluster relative to other superclusters.

Observation data (Epoch J2000)
- Constellation(s): Pavo, Indus, Telescopium
- Right ascension: 20^{h} 48^{m} 26^{s}
- Declination: −39° 06′ 09″
- Parent structure: Laniakea Supercluster
- Major axis: 66 Mpc (215 Mly)
- Redshift: 0.015 (4,500 km/s)
- Distance: 60–70 Mpc (196–228 Mly)

Other designations
- SCL 175

The Pavo–Indus Supercluster is a neighboring supercluster located about 60–70 Mpc (196–228 Mly) away in the constellations of Pavo, Indus, and Telescopium. The supercluster contains three main clusters, Abell 3656, Abell 3698, and Abell 3742.

Other groups and clusters in the supercluster include the NGC 6769 Group and Abell S805 (IC 4765 Group, Pavo II, DRCG 1842-63) and the massive Norma Cluster.

In 2014, it was announced that the Pavo–Indus Supercluster is a lobe in a greater supercluster, Laniakea, that is centered on the Great Attractor. The Virgo Supercluster would also be part of this greater supercluster, thus becoming the local supercluster.

== Structure ==
The Pavo–Indus Supercluster exhibits a wall or filamentary structure that extends to a total length of 66 Mpc (215 Mly). The supercluster along with the Telescopium−Grus Cloud form parts of a wall bounding the Local Void and the Sculptor Void.

== Nearby superclusters ==
=== Centaurus Supercluster ===
In 1983, in a paper by Winkler et al it was suggested based on redshift maps of the distribution of galaxies that the Pavo–Indus Supercluster may be connected to the Centaurus Supercluster. Later in 1984, in a collaboration with astronomer Tony Fairall and in a separate paper by Fairall published in 1988 titled "A redshift map of the Triangulum Australe–Ara region: further indication that Centaurus and Pavo are one and the same supercluster" it was concluded based on distribution of galaxies in redshift space that the Pavo–Indus supercluster was indeed connected to the Centaurus and Hydra supercluster and that the Virgo Supercluster was an appendage of a larger structure involving these superclusters. Later studies concluded that Pavo–Indus formed part of a wall of galaxies similar in size to the CfA2 Great Wall, dubbed the Norma Wall with the Norma Cluster at its center similar to the Coma Cluster. This wall encompasses the Pavo–Indus supercluster through the Norma Cluster, passing the ZOA in the Great Attractor region, to meet up with the Centaurus–Crux Cluster at a redshift at about 5,700–6,200 km/s s and the CIZA J1324.7−5736 cluster at a redshift of 5700 km/s while also splitting off to form the Centaurus Wall passing the galactic plane to meet up with Centaurus Cluster where the supercluster originates.

=== Perseus–Pisces Supercluster ===
Di Nel la H. et al found no evidence of a connection between Pavo–Indus and the Perseus–Pisces Supercluster. However, Tully et al. revealed the existence of a filamentary extension of the Pavo–Indus Supercluster known as the Arch that caps the Local Void in the supergalactic north and provides a connection to the Perseus–Pisces Supercluster before terminating close to the NGC 7242 Cluster.

=== Ophiuchus Supercluster ===
The Pavo–Indus supercluster lies physically close to the Ophiuchus Supercluster and may be connected in an unknown filament between the two superclusters.

== See also ==
- Abell catalogue
- Large-scale structure of the universe
- List of Abell clusters
- Supercluster
