= NGC 101 =

Galaxy in the constellation Sculptor

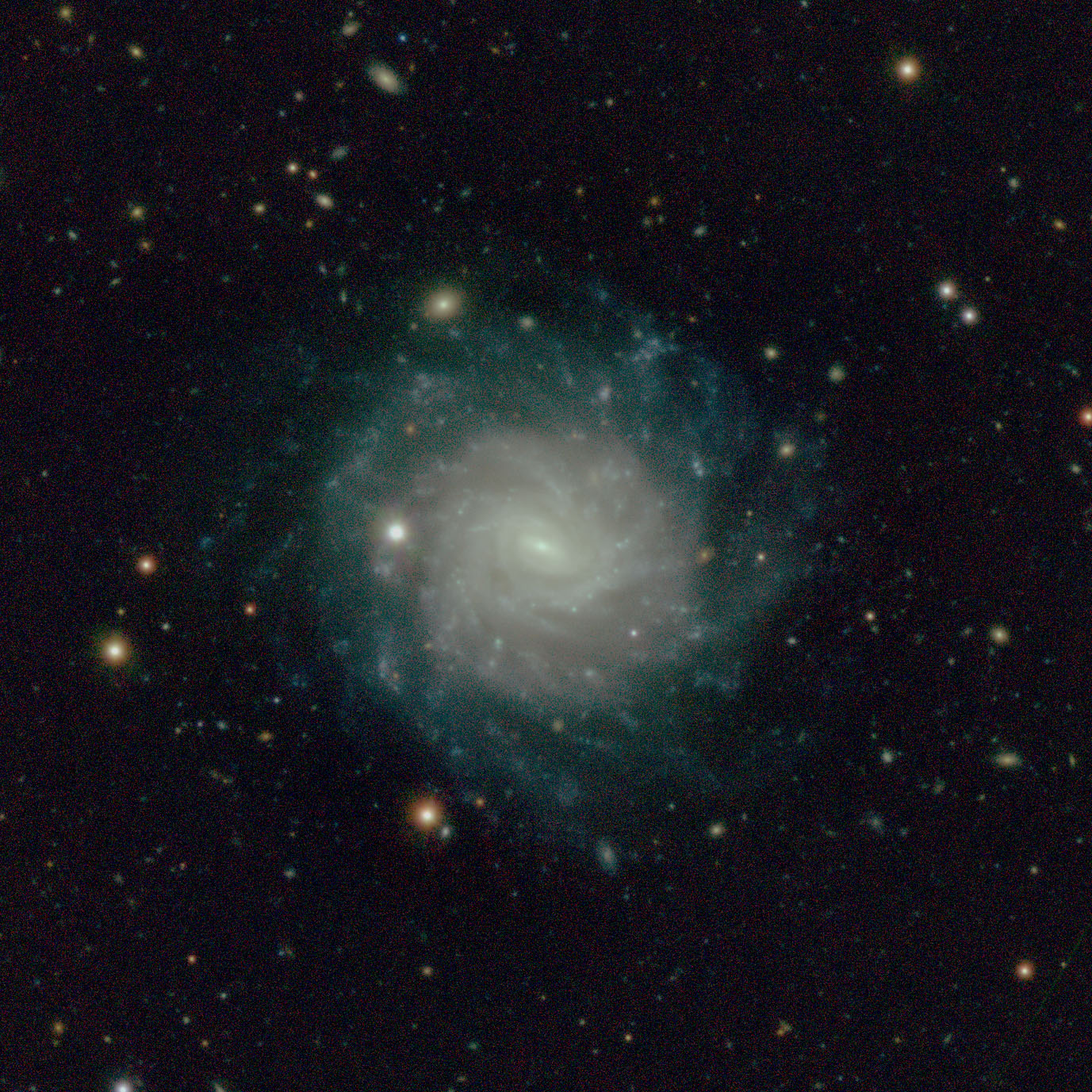
- ESO KIDS image of NGC 101

Observation data (J2000 epoch)
- Constellation: Sculptor
- Right ascension: 00^{h} 23^{m} 54.614^{s}
- Declination: −32° 32′ 10.34″
- Redshift: 0.011284
- Heliocentric radial velocity: 3383
- Distance: 149.8 Mly (45.92 Mpc)
- Apparent magnitude (V): 12.84
- Apparent magnitude (B): 13.36

Characteristics
- Type: SAB(rs)cd:
- Size: 119,200 ly (36,560 pc) (Note: 2MASS K_{s} bands used.)
- Apparent size (V): 2.2′ × 2.0′

Other designations
- MGC-05-02-003, PGC 1518

NGC 101 is a spiral galaxy estimated to be about 150 million light-years away in the constellation of Sculptor. It was discovered by John Herschel in 1834 and its magnitude is 12.8. It is a member of the Southern Supercluster the closest galaxy supercluster to the Local Supercluster.

== Notes ==
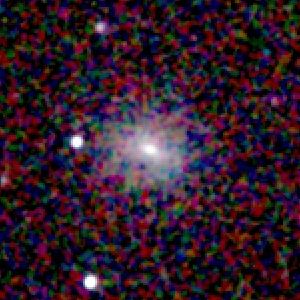
NGC 101 (2MASS)
