= NGC 4329 =

Galaxy in the constellation Corvus

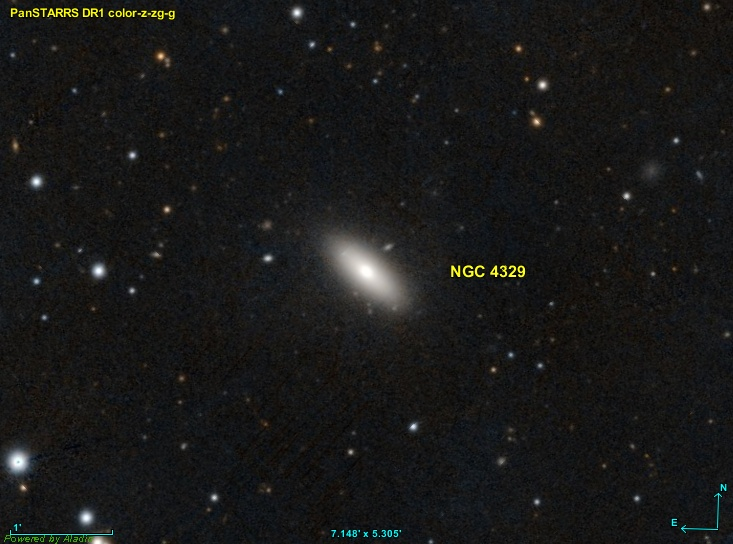
- Image of NGC 4329 by PanSTARRS.

Observation data (J2000 epoch)
- Constellation: Corvus
- Right ascension: 12^{h} 23^{m} 20.7^{s}
- Declination: −12° 33′ 31″
- Redshift: 0.014153
- Heliocentric radial velocity: 4243 km/s
- Distance: 144 Mly (44.2 Mpc)
- Apparent magnitude (V): 14.5

Characteristics
- Type: E+
- Size: ~62,100 ly (19.03 kpc) (estimated)
- Apparent size (V): 2.4 x 1.4

Other designations
- PGC 040212, MCG -02-32-009

NGC 4329 is an elliptical galaxy located 144 million light-years away in the constellation Corvus. The galaxy was discovered by astronomer John Herschel on March 9, 1828. NGC 4329 is host a supermassive black hole with an estimated mass of 3.1×10^{8} solar masses. NGC 4329 is a member of a group of 5 galaxies known as [T2015] nest 100478. NGC 4329 is the brightest member of this group and the group includes the galaxies IC 785, IC 786, MCG-02-32-006, and LEDA 170189. The redshift of NGC 4329 places it in the within the bounds of the Hydra-Centaurus supercluster.

== See also ==
- List of NGC objects (4001–5000)
