= NGC 7205 =

Galaxy in the constellation Indus

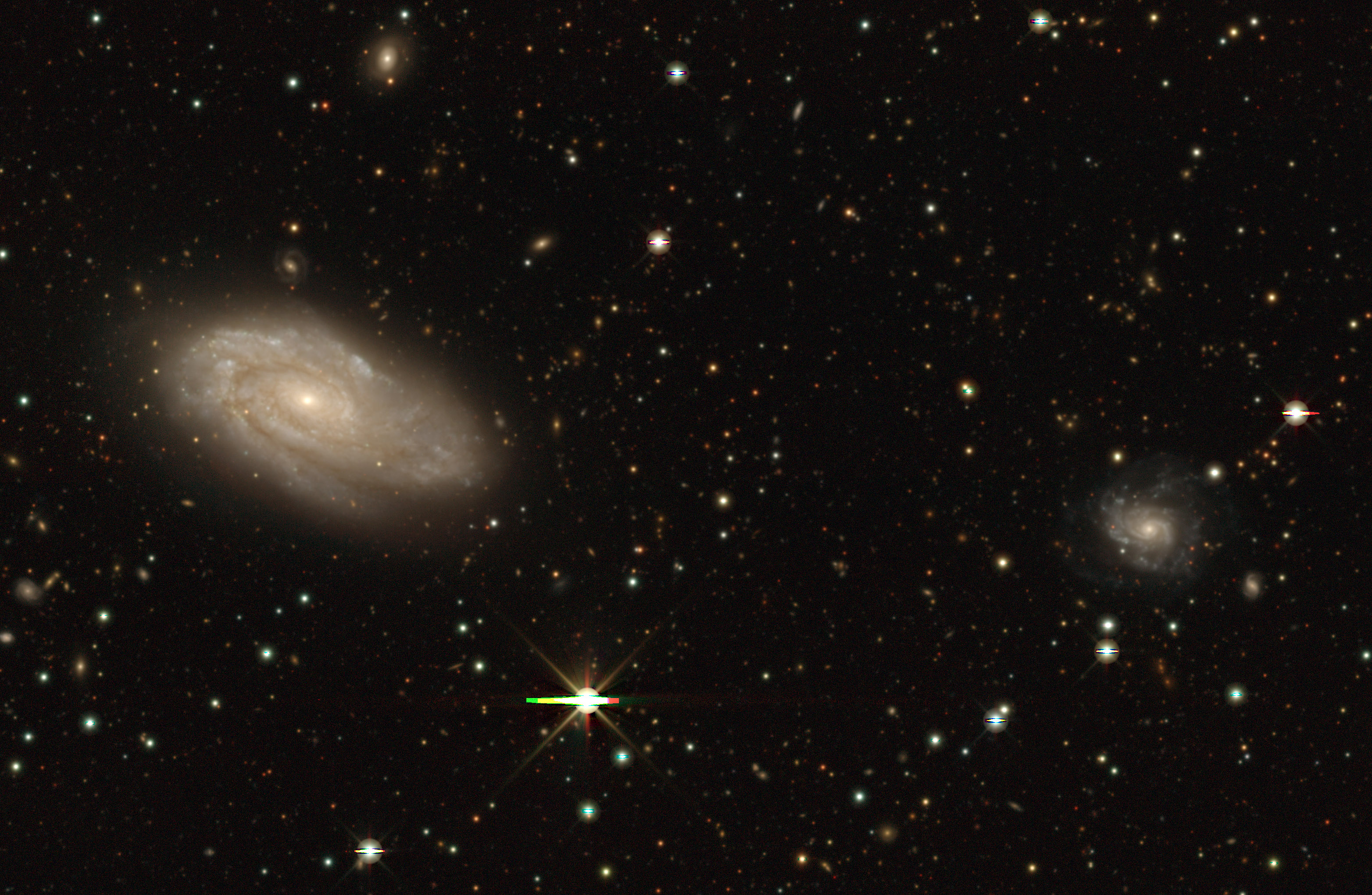
- NGC 7205 (left) by Legacy Surveys

Observation data (J2000 epoch)
- Constellation: Indus
- Right ascension: 22^{h} 08^{m} 34.3225^{s}
- Declination: −57° 26′ 33.354″
- Redshift: 0.005623 ± 0.000019
- Heliocentric radial velocity: 1,686 ± 6 km/s
- Distance: 61.9 ± 6.6 Mly (19.0 ± 2.0 Mpc)
- Apparent magnitude (V): 10.8

Characteristics
- Type: SA(s)bc
- Size: ~67,400 ly (20.65 kpc) (estimated)
- Apparent size (V): 4.1′ × 2.0′

Other designations
- ESO 146- G 009, AM 2205-574, IRAS 22052-5741, PGC 68128

NGC 7205 is a spiral galaxy in the constellation Indus. The galaxy lies about 60 million light years away from Earth based on redshift independent methods, which means, given its apparent dimensions, that NGC 7205 is approximately 70,000 light years across. It was discovered by John Herschel on June 10, 1834.

Although the galaxy is characterised as unbarred, Eskridge found evidence that the galaxy has a weak bar. The galaxy has two spiral arms arranged in a grand design pattern. The arms can be traced for a full revolution, but both arms appear to branch after completing half a revolution. The galaxy is asymmetric. The HII regions at the north and eastern parts of the galaxy are more luminous in H-alpha than the rest. They appear to be complex, being composed from multiple star formation regions. The largest of the HII regions are 3 arcseconds across. In the centre of the galaxy lies a supermassive black hole, whose mass is estimated to be 10^{6.68 ± 0.41} (2 - 12 millions) M_{☉}, based on the pitch angle of the spiral arms.

NGC 7205 forms a non interacting pair with NGC 7205A, lying 8.5 arcminutes away. NGC 7205 is a member of the Telescopium−Grus Cloud.
