= Virgo Supercluster =

Local supercluster home to the Milky Way

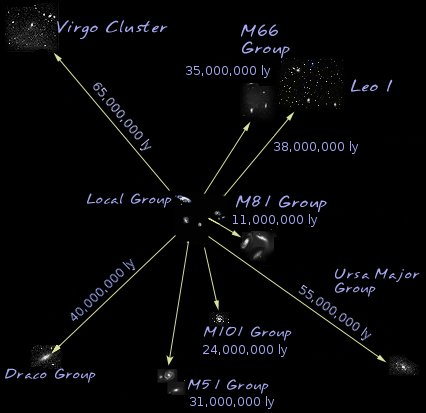
- Distances from the Local Group for selected groups and clusters within the Virgo Supercluster

Observation data (Epoch J2000)
- Constellation(s): Virgo & Coma Berenices (Virgo Cluster)
- Right ascension: 12^{h} 31^{m}
- Declination: +12° 24′
- Number of galaxies: 47,000+
- Parent structure: Virgo–Hydra–Centaurus Supercluster, Centaurus Wall, Laniakea Supercluster
- Major axis: 147 Mly (45 Mpc)
- Minor axis: ≈26.1 Mly (8 Mpc)
- Redshift: Doppler shift
- Distance: 55.62 ± 8.395 Mly (17.053 ± 2.574 Mpc) (Virgo Cluster)
- Binding mass: ~1.48×10^{15} M_{☉}
- Luminosity (specify): 3×10^{12} L_{☉} (total)

Other designations
- Local Supercluster, Virgo Supercluster, LSC, LS, Virgo Extension

The Virgo Supercluster (Virgo SC) or Local Supercluster (LSC or LS), also known as the Virgo Extension, is a supercluster of galaxies containing the Virgo Cluster and Local Group. The latter contains the Milky Way and Andromeda galaxies, among others. The Virgo Supercluster is roughly centered on the Virgo Cluster, with the Local Group located near one edge.

At least 100 galaxy groups and clusters are located within the supercluster diameter of 45 megaparsecs (147 million light-years; 1.39×10^{21} kilometres). The Virgo Supercluster is one of about 10 million superclusters in the observable universe, with the main body of the supercluster, the Virgo Strand, connecting the Hydra-Centaurus and the Perseus–Pisces Superclusters. It is part of the Pisces–Cetus Supercluster Complex, a very large galaxy filament.

A 2014 study indicated that the Virgo Supercluster is only a part of an even greater supercluster centered on the Great Attractor, the Laniakea Supercluster. This thus would subsume the former as a component under Laniakea as the newly defined local supercluster based on the definition for a supercluster as basins of attraction rather than large high-density regions as traditionally accepted. Basins of attraction such as Laniakea were later proposed to be called supercluster cocoons to distinguish them from smaller and traditional superclusters, such as Virgo, as high-density regions of the cosmic web.

== Background ==
Beginning with the first large sample of nebulae published by William and John Herschel in 1863, it was known that there is a marked excess of nebular fields in the constellation Virgo, near the north galactic pole. In the 1950s, French–American astronomer Gérard de Vaucouleurs was the first to argue that this excess represented a large-scale galaxy-like structure, coining the term "Local Supergalaxy" in 1953, which he changed to "Local Supercluster" (LSC) in 1958. Harlow Shapley, in his 1959 book Of Stars and Men, suggested the term Metagalaxy.

Debate went on during the 1960s and 1970s as to whether the Local Supercluster (LS) was actually a structure or a chance alignment of galaxies. The issue was resolved with the large redshift surveys of the late 1970s and early 1980s, which convincingly showed the flattened concentration of galaxies along the supergalactic plane.

== Structure ==
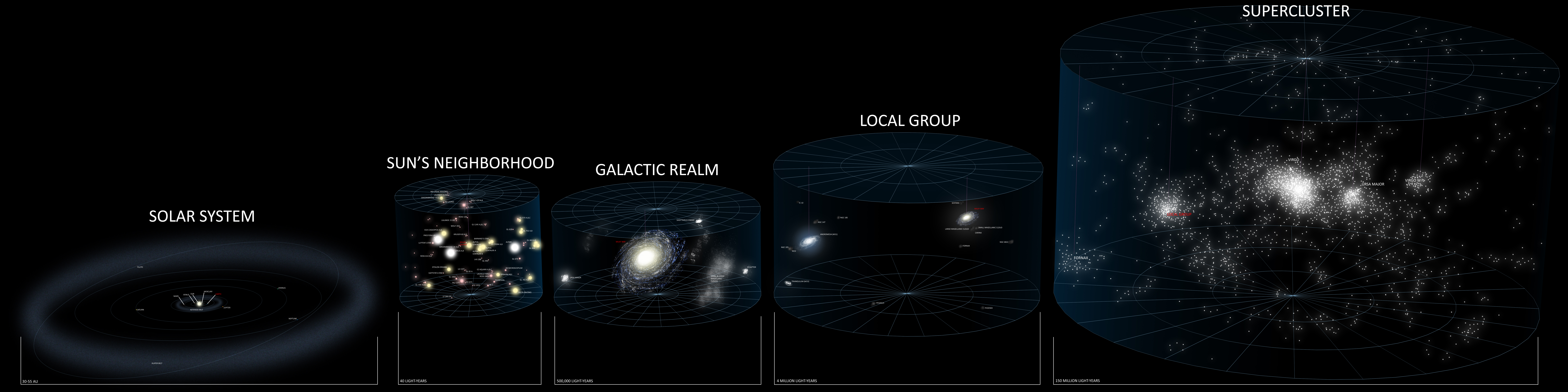
An old diagram showing the location of the Local Group, including the Solar System, within the Virgo Supercluster, revealing its location at the supercluster's outskirts with the Virgo Cluster forming its heart. The Fornax Cluster shown at the left was later revealed to be a separated part of the Southern Supercluster. Both superclusters are part of the greater Laniakea Basin of Attraction (see below).

In 1982, R. Brent Tully presented the conclusions of his research concerning the basic structure of the LS. It consists of two components: an appreciably flattened disk containing two-thirds of the supercluster's luminous galaxies, and a roughly spherical halo containing the remaining third. The disk itself is a thin (~1 Mpc) ellipsoid with a long axis / short axis ratio of at least 6 to 1, and possibly as high as 9 to 1. Data released in June 2003 from the 5-year Two-degree-Field Galaxy Redshift Survey (2dF) has allowed astronomers to compare the LS to other superclusters. The LS represents a typical poor (that is, lacking a high density core) supercluster of rather small size. It has one rich galaxy cluster in the center, surrounded by filaments of galaxies and poor groups.

The Local Group is located on the outskirts of the LS in a small filament extending from the Fornax Cluster to the Virgo Cluster. The Virgo Supercluster's volume is roughly 7,000 times that of the Local Group, or 100 billion times that of the Milky Way.

The main body of the Virgo Supercluster, also known as the Virgo Strand or Virgo concentration, the flattened disk of galaxies, is simply part of a larger galaxy filament known as the Centaurus–Virgo–PP Filament. This filament emanates from the Centaurus Cluster through the Virgo Cluster and continues through the Ursa Major Cluster (The Ursa Major Cluster, which is part of the Ursa Major Cloud, also forms a connection with the Canes Venatici-Camelopardalis Cloud), all the way to the Perseus–Pisces Supercluster. The Virgo Strand consists of two branches, an upper branch consisting of the main body of the supercluster though the Virgo Southern Extension, the Virgo and the Ursa Major Clusters, and a lower branch consisting of the Crater and Leo Clouds. The rest of remaining third of the galaxies in Virgo Supercluster, including the Milky Way, lie outside the Virgo Strand.

== Galaxy distribution ==
The number density of galaxies in the LS falls off with the square of the distance from its center near the Virgo Cluster, suggesting that this cluster is not randomly located. Overall, the vast majority of the luminous galaxies (less than absolute magnitude −13) are concentrated in a small number of clouds (groups of galaxy clusters). Ninety-eight percent can be found in the following 11 clouds, given in decreasing order of number of luminous galaxies: Canes Venatici, Virgo Cluster, Virgo II (southern extension), Leo II, Virgo III, Crater (NGC 3672), Leo I, Leo Minor (NGC 2841), Draco (NGC 5907), Antlia (NGC 2997), and NGC 5643.

Of the luminous galaxies located in the disk, one-third are in the Virgo Cluster, with the other two-thirds located outside of the cluster.

The luminous galaxies in the halo are concentrated in a small number of clouds (94% in 7 clouds). This distribution indicates that "most of the volume of the supergalactic plane is a great void." A helpful analogy that matches the observed distribution is that of soap bubbles. Flattish clusters and superclusters are found at the intersection of bubbles, which are large, roughly spherical (on the order of 20–60 Mpc in diameter) voids in space. Long filamentary structures seem to predominate. An example of this is the Hydra–Centaurus Supercluster, the nearest supercluster to the Virgo Supercluster, which starts at a distance of roughly 30 Mpc and extends to 60 Mpc.

Below is a table of known supercluster members.

Known Supercluster members
Cluster name	Brightest member
Local Group	-
Virgo Cluster	Messier 49
Sculptor Group	NGC 253
IC 342/Maffei Group	IC 342/Dwingeloo 1
M 81 Group	M 81
Canes I Group	M 94
Canes II Group	M 106
NGC 5128 Group	Centaurus A
Leo I Group	M 96
Leo II Groups	-

== Cosmology ==
=== Large-scale dynamics ===
Since the late 1980s it has been apparent that not only the Local Group, but all matter out to a distance of at least 50 Mpc is experiencing a bulk flow on the order of 600 km/s in the direction of the Norma Cluster (Abell 3627). Lynden-Bell et al. (1988) dubbed the cause of this the "Great Attractor". The Great Attractor is now understood to be the center of mass of an even larger structure of galaxy clusters and basin of attraction (BoA), dubbed "Laniakea", which includes the Virgo and Hydra-Centaurus Superclusters (including the Local Group) and several other superclusters and structures. Laniakea has therefore been proposed to be called a supercluster cocoon instead to distinguish the structure from smaller embedded superclusters traditionally defined as high-density regions.

The Great Attractor, together with the entire Laniakea, is found to be moving toward Shapley Supercluster, with center of Shapley Attractor, and may be itself potentially part of this even greater concentration.

=== Dark matter ===
The LS has a total mass M ≈ 10^{15} M_{☉} and a total optical luminosity L ≈ 3×10^{12} L_{☉}. This yields a mass-to-light ratio of about 300 times that of the solar ratio (M_{☉}/L_{☉} = 1), a figure that is consistent with results obtained for other superclusters. By comparison, the mass-to-light ratio for the Milky Way is 63.8 assuming a solar absolute magnitude of 4.83, a Milky Way absolute magnitude of −20.9, and a Milky Way mass of 1.25×10^{12} M_{☉}. These ratios are one of the main arguments in favor of the presence of large amounts of dark matter in the universe; if dark matter did not exist, much smaller mass-to-light ratios would be expected.

== Gallery ==
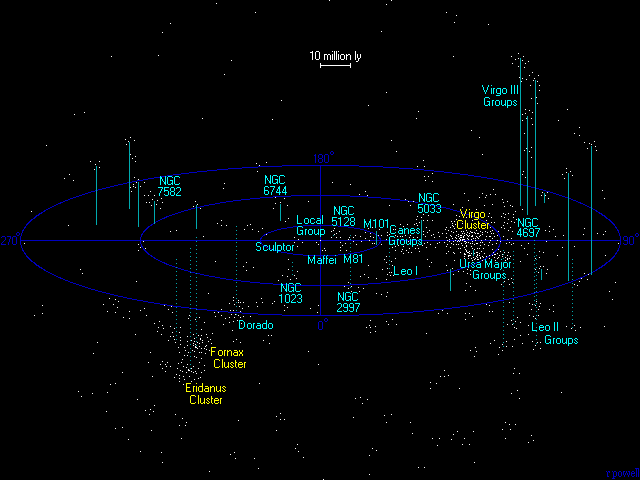
Map of the nearby universe within 100 million light-years from Earth, including a portion of the Southern Supercluster at the bottom left and the Virgo Supercluster on the right in supergalactic coordinates (click on feature names for more information)

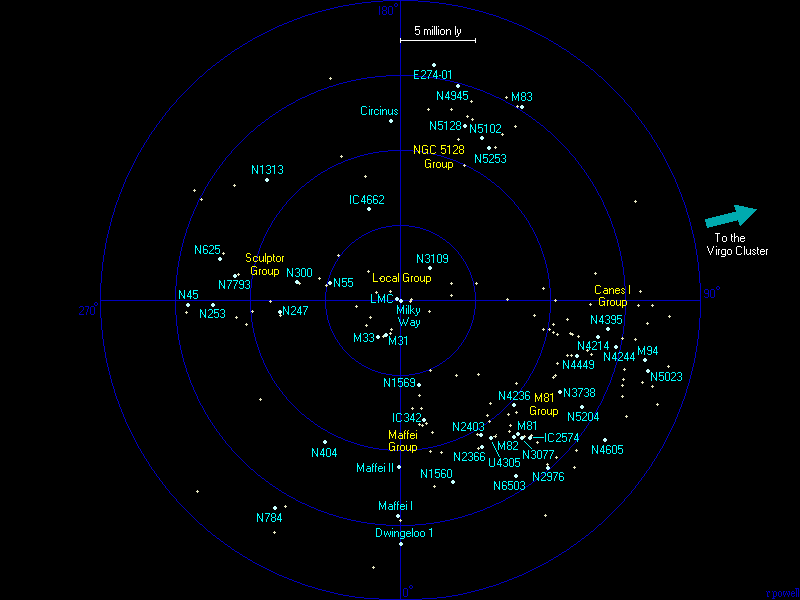
The nearest galaxy groups projected onto the supergalactic plane (click on feature names for more information)

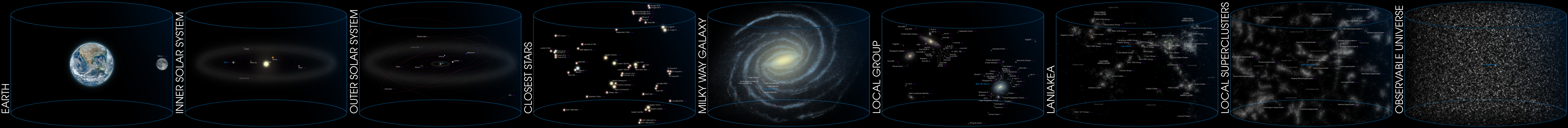
A diagram of Earth's location in the observable universe (alternative image)

== See also ==
- Abell catalogue
- List of Abell clusters
- Local Hole
