= Laniakea Supercluster =

Basin of attraction home to the Milky Way

- A map of the Laniakea and some of its component galaxy superclusters and clusters. Note that other components are missing, such as the Great Attractor and Ophiuchus Cluster.

Observation data (Epoch J2000)
- Constellation(s): Triangulum Australe and Norma (Great Attractor)
- Right ascension: 10^{h} 32^{m} (Great Attractor)
- Declination: −46° 00′ (Great Attractor)
- Number of galaxies: 100,000–150,000
- Parent structure: Pisces–Cetus Supercluster Complex (Shapley Concentration?)
- Major axis: 404 Mly (124 Mpc) (Note: The calculated volume in Dupuy et al. (2021) is 1.9×10^{6} Mpc per cube.)
- Redshift: 0.0708 (center)
- Distance: 250 million ly (77 Mpc) h^{−1}_{67.80 ± 0.077} (Great Attractor) (H_{0} from Planck 2013)
- Binding mass: 1×10^{17} M_{☉}

Other designations
- Laniakea, Laniakea Supercluster, Local Supercluster, Laniakea Complex, Laniakea BoA

The Laniakea Supercluster or Laniakea for short (/ˌlɑːni.əˈkeɪ.ə/; Hawaiian lit. 'immense heaven') is the large-scale structure centered around the Great Attractor that is home to the Milky Way and approximately 100,000 other nearby galaxies. It was originally defined in September 2014 as a galaxy supercluster, when a group of astronomers, including R. Brent Tully of the University of Hawaiʻi at Mānoa, Hélène Courtois of the University of Lyon, Yehuda Hoffman of the Hebrew University of Jerusalem, and Daniel Pomarède of CEA Université Paris-Saclay published a new way of defining superclusters according to the relative velocities of galaxies as basins of attraction. The new definition of the Local Supercluster subsumes the then prior defined Virgo and Hydra-Centaurus Supercluster as appendages, the former being the historical local supercluster.

Follow-up studies suggest that the Laniakea is not gravitationally bound. It will disperse rather than continue to maintain itself as an overdensity relative to surrounding areas. In addition, some papers favored the traditional definition of superclusters as high-density regions of the cosmic web; basins of attraction including Laniakea were therefore proposed to be called "supercluster cocoons" (or "cocoons" for short), containing smaller traditional superclusters, which evolve inside their parent cocoon.

Laniakea is the inner part of the local superstructure, also known as Pisces–Cetus Supercluster Complex. Both are among the largest known cosmic structures in the observable universe. Latest observations of basins of attraction suggested a basin of attraction around Ophiuchus Cluster may be associated with Laniakea, and also have found both are moving toward the Shapley Concentration and may thus be part of this greater structure.

== Name ==
The name Laniākea ([ˈlɐnijaːˈkɛjə]) literally means 'immense heaven' in Hawaiian, from lani 'heaven' and ākea 'spacious, immeasurable'. The name was suggested by Nawaʻa Napoleon, an associate professor of Hawaiian language at Kapiʻolani Community College. The name honors Polynesian navigators, who used knowledge of the sky to navigate the Pacific Ocean.

== Characteristics ==
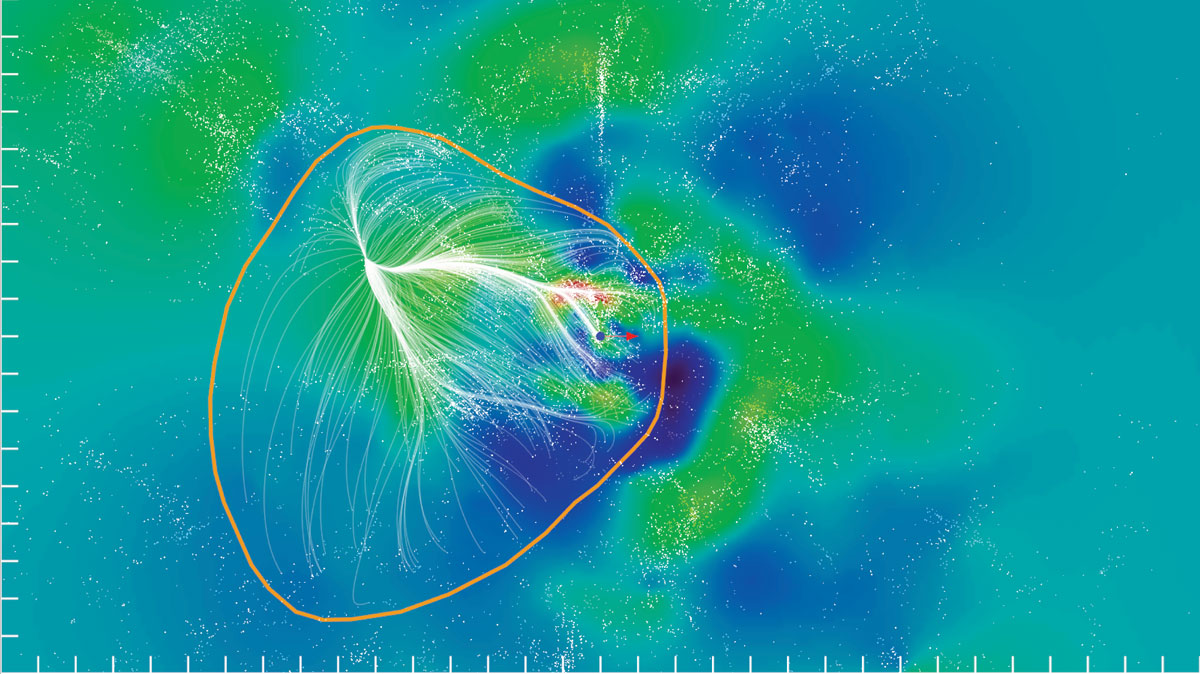
The Laniakea shown in a computer-generated visualization with an orange outline, with white lines inside indicating the motion of galaxies toward its center. The blue dot shows the location of the Milky Way.

A video showing in 3D Laniakea and other nearby superclusters of galaxies

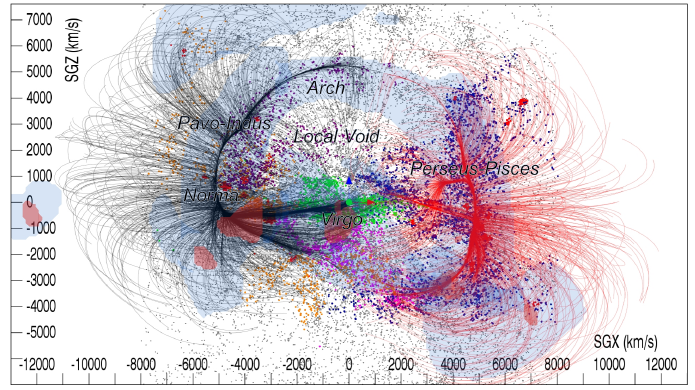
Conglomerate of Laniakea and Perseus–Pisces Superclusters, with the Local Group shown at the center

The Laniakea supercluster encompasses approximately 100,000 galaxies stretched out roughly 120 Mpc (400 million ly). It has the approximate mass of 10^{17} solar masses (M_{☉}), or 100,000 times that of our galaxy, which is almost the same as that of the Horologium Supercluster. It consists of several previously defined subparts, including smaller superclusters based on their traditional definition:

- Centaurus Wall
  - Virgo–Hydra–Centaurus Supercluster
    - Virgo Supercluster, the part in which the Virgo Cluster and the Local Group, including the Milky Way, reside.
    - Hydra–Centaurus Supercluster
      - Antlia Wall, known as Hydra Supercluster
      - Centaurus Supercluster
  - Southern Supercluster Strand or Fornax Wall, including Fornax Cluster (S373), Dorado and Eridanus clouds.
- Ophiuchus Supercluster, (Note: Although not directly stated in Tully et al. (2014), the said paper mentioned "an extension to the Ophiuchus Cluster") including the Ophiuchus Cluster, the site of Ophiuchus Supercluster eruption
- Norma Wall, (Note: Although not mentioned in Tully et al. (2014), the said paper had considered the Laniakea to encompass the Pavo–Indus filament and the Norma Supercluster, including the Norma Cluster, which have been historically known to make part of the Norma Wall) including the Norma Supercluster, which contains the Norma Cluster
  - Pavo–Indus Supercluster
  - the Great Attractor, Laniakea's central gravitational point near Norma
- Several bounding voids
  - Local Void
  - Sculptor Void

The most massive galaxy clusters of the Laniakea are Virgo, Hydra, Centaurus, Abell 3565, Abell 3656, Abell 2870, Abell 3581, Abell 3574, Abell 3521, Fornax, Eridanus, Ophiuchus, and Norma. The entire supercluster cocoon consists of approximately 300 to 500 known galaxy clusters and groups. The real number may be much larger because some of these are traversing the Zone of Avoidance, an area of the sky that is partially obscured by gas and dust from the Milky Way galaxy, making them essentially undetectable.

Superclusters are some of the universe's largest structures and have boundaries that are difficult to define, especially from the inside. Within a given supercluster, most galaxy motions will be directed inward, toward the center of mass. This gravitational focal point, in the case of Laniakea, is called the Great Attractor, and influences the motions of the Local Group of galaxies, where the Milky Way galaxy resides, and all others throughout the supercluster. The same study that confirmed the Laniakea proposed to define a supercluster as basins of attraction, rather than high-density regions such as the Virgo Supercluster. Unlike its constituent then-known superclusters, which would collapse in the far future, Laniakea is, however, not gravitationally bound and is projected to be torn apart by dark energy. Follow-up studies favored the traditional definition of superclusters as high-density regions, with referred to basins of attraction such as Laniakea as "supercluster cocoons" ("cocoons") or "watershed superclusters" ("watersheds"). Because there is no community consensus on an agreed definition of the term supercluster, other studies avoid calling any structure a supercluster, including Laniakea and Shapley, which were referred as simply basins of attraction.

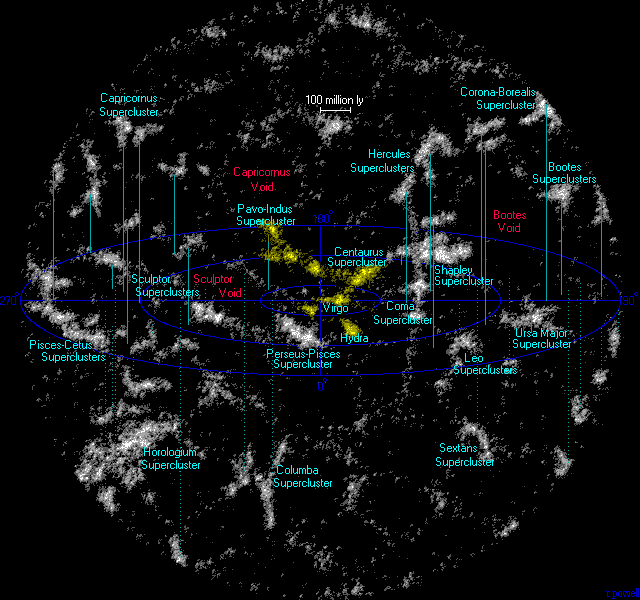
A map of superclusters within the nearby universe, with Laniakea shown in yellow

Although confirmation of the existence of the Laniakea supercluster emerged in 2014, early studies in the 1980s already suggested that several of the then-known superclusters might be connected. For example, South African astronomer Tony Fairall stated in 1988 that redshifts suggested that the Virgo and Hydra–Centaurus superclusters may be connected, with some studies considering both superclusters as a single structural entity, hence called Virgo–Hydra–Centaurus Supercluster. More recent observations using Cosmicflows-4 catalog have shown that a basin of attraction centered on the Ophiuchus Cluster might be associated with Laniakea, forming a "probabilistic Basin of Attraction" ("p-BoA").

== Location ==
The neighboring superclusters to the Laniakea are the Shapley, Hercules, Coma, and Perseus–Pisces Superclusters. The edges of the superclusters and Laniakea were not clearly known at the time of Laniakea's definition. Since then, the study of the edges of superclusters and of structures beyond them has substantially improved. Because the Laniakea, Apus, and Coma superclusters are moving toward the Shapley Supercluster, they may be sub-basins part of this larger basin of attraction.

Laniakea is also a constituent part of a much larger local superstructure that has also been proposed by R. Brent Tully, referred to as the Pisces–Cetus Supercluster Complex, a galaxy filament.

== See also ==
- Dipole repeller – Center of effective repulsion in the large-scale flow of galaxies near the Milky Way
- Illustris project – Computer-simulated universes
