= Nawaʻa Napoleon =

Hawaiian linguist and educator

- David John Nāwaʻakauluaokamehameha Napoleon
- Scientific career
- Fields: Linguistics
- Institutions: Kapiʻolani Community College, University of Hawaiʻi

David John Nāwaʻakauluaokamehameha "Nawa’a" Napoleon is an associate professor of Hawaiian Language and chair of the Department of Languages, Linguistics, and Literature at Kapiʻolani Community College, University of Hawaiʻi. He is best known for suggesting the name of our supercluster, Laniakea.

Napoleon has served as an educator, administrator and leader at Kapiʻolani Community College for more than three decades. He holds a Bachelor of Arts in Hawaiian studies from UH Hilo and a Master of Arts in Hawaiian studies from the University of Hawaiʻi at Mānoa.

== Awards ==
- 2015 "Educator of the Year" award by the Native Hawaiian Education Association.

== See also ==
- Laniakea Supercluster
