= NGC 289 =

Galaxy in the constellation of Sculptor

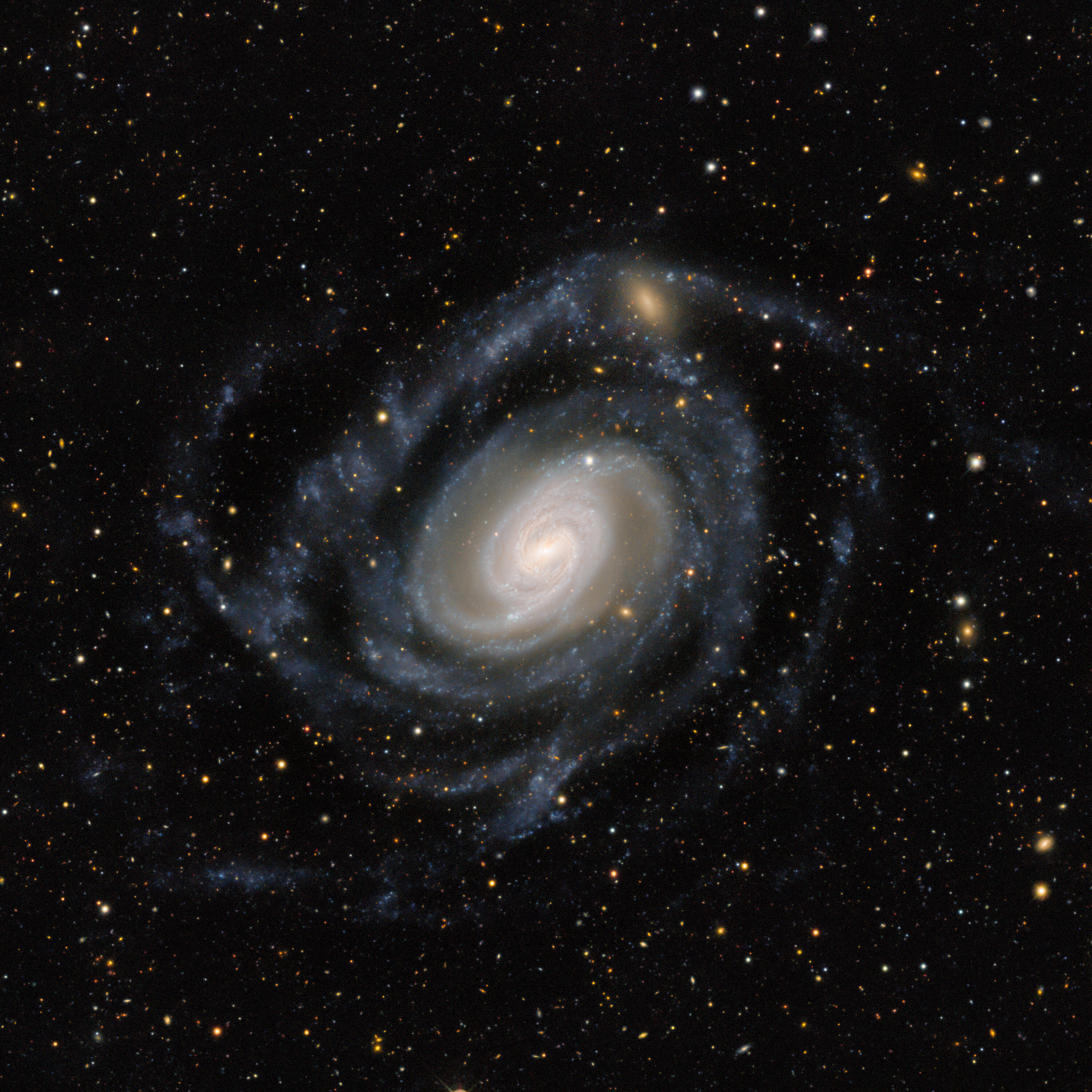
- NGC 289 imaged by the Víctor M. Blanco Telescope

Observation data (J2000 epoch)
- Constellation: Sculptor
- Right ascension: 00^{h} 52^{m} 42.365^{s}
- Declination: −31° 12′ 20.99″
- Redshift: 0.0054
- Heliocentric radial velocity: 1,628 km/s
- Distance: 76.1 Mly (23.33 Mpc)
- Apparent magnitude (V): 11.0
- Apparent magnitude (B): 11.4

Characteristics
- Type: SB(rs)bc
- Apparent size (V): 3.1' x 2.5'

Other designations
- MCG -05-03-010, IRAS 00502-3128, PGC 3089, 2MASSX J00524236-3112209

NGC 289 is a spiral galaxy in the southern constellation of Sculptor, located at a distance of 76 megalight-years from the Milky Way. It was discovered on September 27, 1834, by John Herschel. The compiler of the New General Catalogue, John Louis Emil Dreyer, noted that NGC 289 was "pretty bright, large, extended, between 2 considerably bright stars". The plane of the galaxy is inclined by an angle of 45° to the line of sight from the Earth.

This is a Type II Seyfert galaxy with an active galactic nucleus. A dust lane is seen crossing the nucleus, and there are indications of recent starburst activity nearby. NGC 289 is a giant, gas-rich, low surface brightness galaxy with a small bulge at the nucleus, a small central bar, and two inner spiral arms. These arms split into multiple parts as they extend into the outer disk. The galaxy has a dark matter halo that has an estimated 3.5 times the mass of the gaseous and stellar components. There is a dwarf elliptical companion to the north of the galaxy, designated Arp 1981, that may be having a perturbing influence.

== Gallery ==
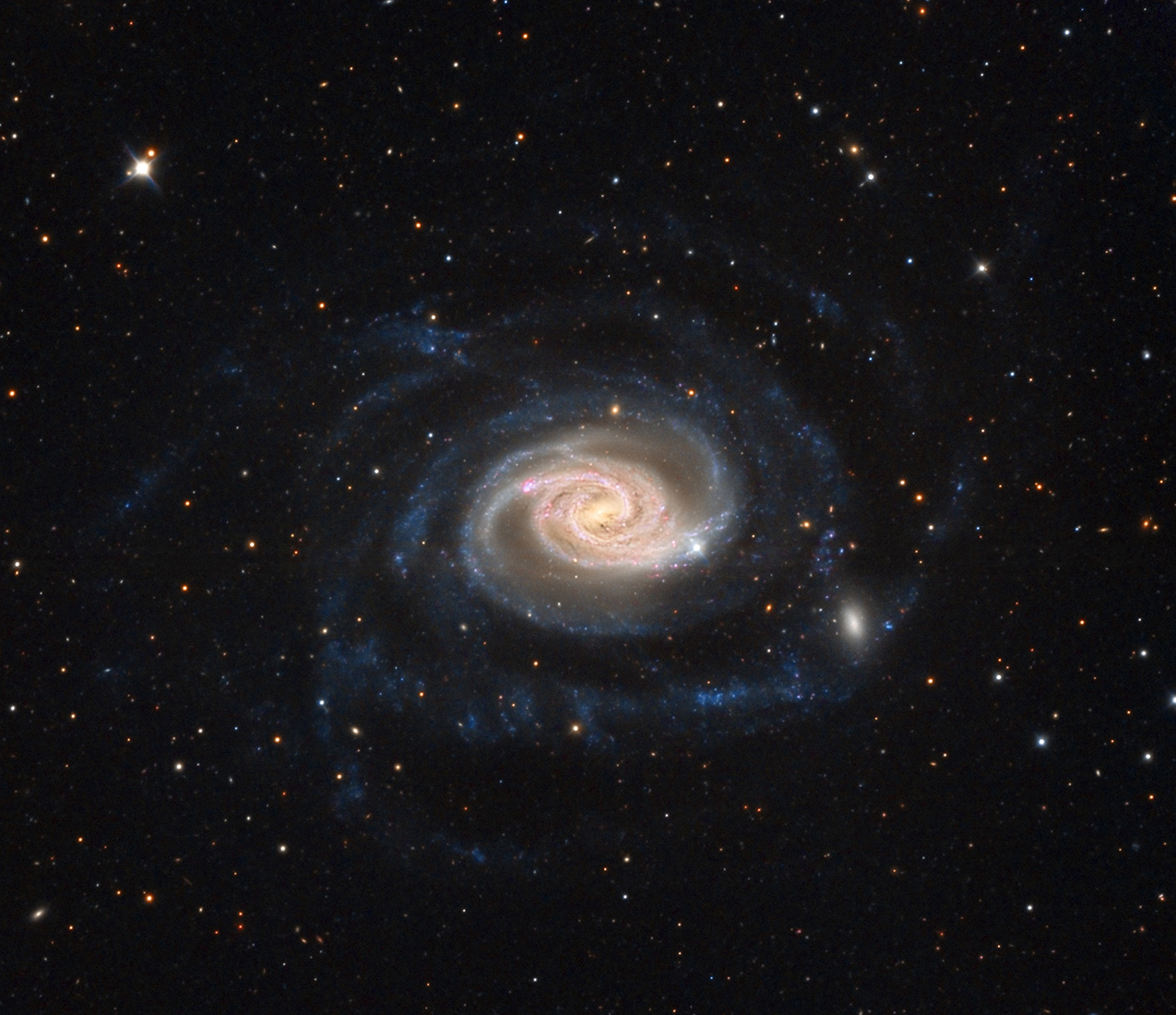
Spiral Galaxy NGC 289 taken at ChileScope Observatory (W76), near Ovalle, Chile. Image courtesy Adam Block.

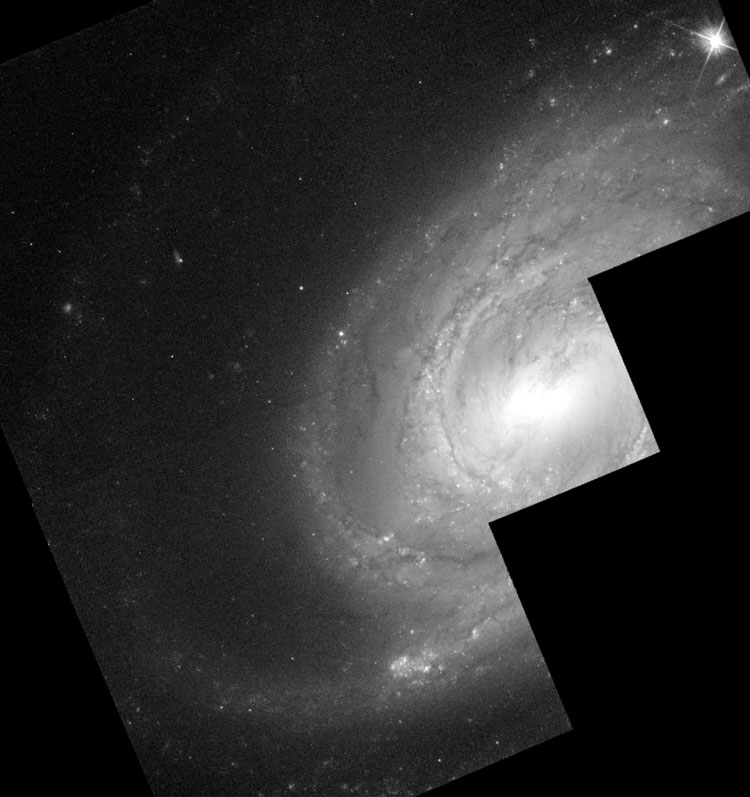
Hubble Space Telescope image of NGC 289
