= Hydra–Centaurus Supercluster =

Galaxy supercluster

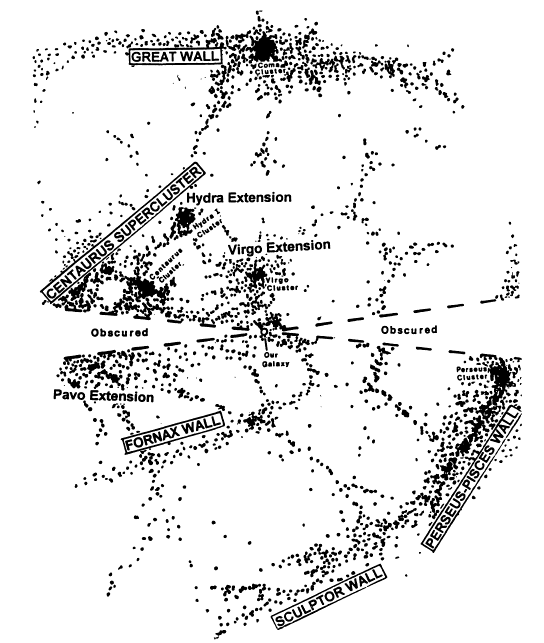
- Distribution of galaxies showing the elements of the Virgo and Hydra–Centaurus Superclusters (assumed as a single structure) on the left

Observation data (Epoch J2000)
- Right ascension: 13^{h} 14^{m} 00.0^{s}
- Declination: −33° 18′ 00″
- Parent structure: Virgo–Hydra–Centaurus Supercluster, Centaurus Wall, Laniakea Supercluster
- Redshift: 0.016000 (4,797 km/s)
- Distance: ~39–69.4 Mpc (127–226 Mly)
- Binding mass: ~4.3×10^{15} M_{☉}

Other designations
- Cen-Hya Supercluster, Hydra-Cen Supercluster, Hydra-Centaurus Supercluster, SCl 128

The Hydra–Centaurus Supercluster (SCl 128), or the Hydra and Centaurus Superclusters, also known as Hydra–Centaurus concentration, is a supercluster in two parts that is the closest neighbour of the Virgo Supercluster. Its center is located about 39 Mpc (127 Mly) away, with it extending to a maximum distance of around 69 Mpc (225 Mly).

Both Virgo and Hydra–Centaurus superclusters are connected and are sometimes considered a single structure, hence referred to as the Virgo–Hydra–Centaurus Supercluster (or sometimes simply the Centaurus Supercluster). They may reside in a larger Centaurus Wall, which also would contain elements of the Southern Supercluster or Fornax Wall, such as the Fornax Cluster. Based on a different definition of a supercluster, they would be smaller lobes of the even larger Laniakea Supercluster, which is a basin of attraction centered around the Great Attractor, as identified in 2014.

== Physical characteristics ==
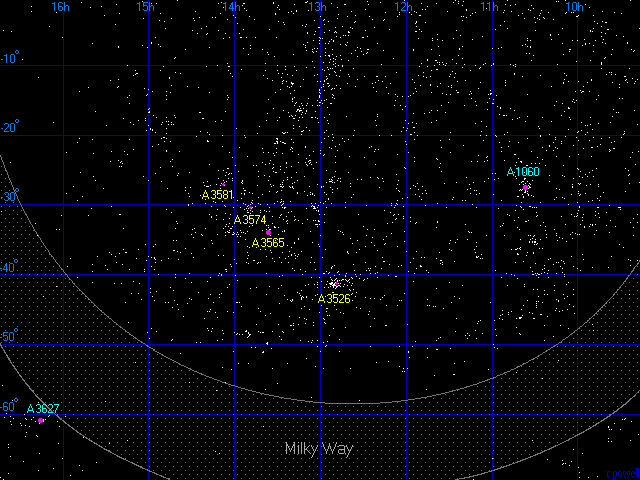
Two-dimensional map of the Centaurus Supercluster

The supercluster includes four large galaxy clusters in the Centaurus part, also known as the "4 clusters'' filament, or ''4 clusters strand'':

- Abell 3537
- Abell 3565
- Abell 3574
- Abell S753

The 4 clusters filament also includes the major Centaurus Cluster (Abell 3526) (For which the supercluster is named for) and extends up to around 260 Mly (80 Mpc) to reach the rich galaxy cluster Abell 3581.

=== Antlia Wall ===
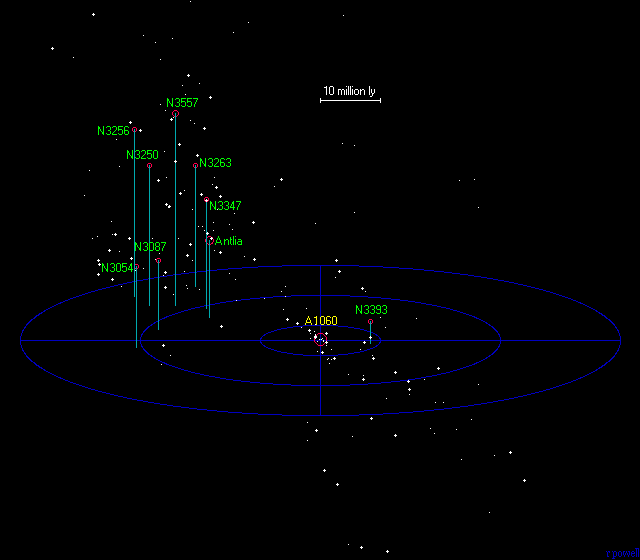
Three-dimensional map of the Hydra Supercluster

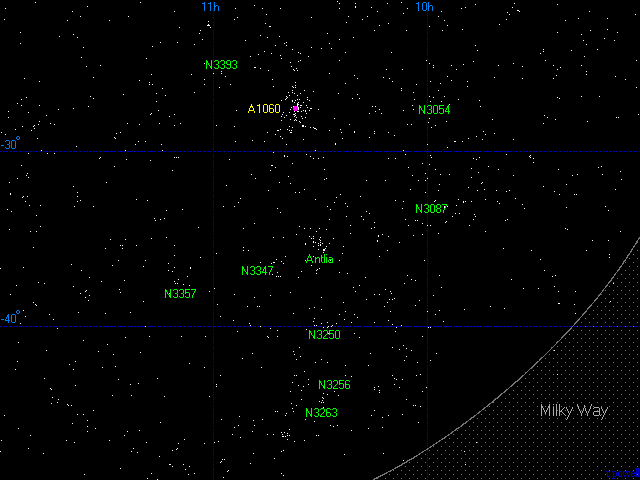
Two-dimensional map of the Hydra Supercluster

The Antlia Wall, also known as the Antlia Strand, Hydra Wall, Hydra-Antlia wall, Hydra-Antlia extension, the Hydra-Antlia filament, or the Hydra and Antlia extensions, is a filament that emerges from the Centaurus Cluster, passes under the Zone of Avoidance (ZOA) as the "Puppis filament", to link up the Lepus Cloud. This filament then passes through a region containing the NGC 1600 Group before crossing the boundary where the gravitional flows of galaxies between the Laniakea and Perseus–Pisces superclusters diverge to link up with the Perseus–Pisces supercluster at a distance of around 420 Mly (130 Mpc) from the Centaurus Cluster. The filament contains two major clusters:

- Hydra Cluster (A1060)
- Antlia Cluster (AS0636)

In 2014, it was revealed that the Antlia Wall, along with the rest of the Hydra–Centaurus Supercluster, is connected to the Perseus–Pisces Supercluster. Later in 2017, Pomarède et.al identified based on the flow of galaxies that the Antlia Wall along with the Lepus Cloud are part of a substantial filament known as the Centaurus–Puppis–PP Filament that extends around 420 Mly (130 Mpc) from the Centaurus Cluster all the way to the Perseus–Pisces supercluster. The Centaurus–Puppis–PP Filament along with the Southern Supercluster Strand which contains the Eridanus-Fornax-Dorado Filament and the Telescopium−Grus Cloud, are part of wall that makes up the front boundary of the Sculptor Void.

Before 2017, it was not known that the Antlia Wall and the Lepus Cloud were part of the same structure, the Centaurus–Puppis–PP Filament. This is because the Centaurus–Puppis–PP Filament goes under the ZOA of the Milky Way, which caused parts of the filament to be obscured by the disk of the galaxy on the sky, resulting in the naming of the different visible pieces of filament.

==== Other clusters ====
Apart from the central clusters, which are 150 to 200 million light years away, several smaller clusters belong to the group.

Within the proximity of this supercluster lies the Great Attractor, dominated by the Norma Cluster (Abell 3627). This massive cluster of galaxies exerts a large gravitational force, causing all matter within 50 Mpc to experience a bulk flow of 600 km/s toward the Norma Cluster.

==== Connection to the Shapley Supercluster ====
The Hydra–Centaurus Supercluster is connected to the Shapley Supercluster by a wall of galaxies known as Front Eastern Wall, that extends to the east and front of the Shapley supercluster at a redshift distance of 10,000-11,000 km/s. This wall of galaxies contains the galaxy clusters Abell 3571, Abell 3572, Abell 3575 and the galaxy group SC1336-314. The galaxy cluster Abell 3570 is located at the southern tip of the wall and Abell 3578 at its northern tip.

== Laniakea ==
A 2014 announcement says that the Centaurus Supercluster (Hydra–Centaurus) is just a lobe in a greater structure defined as a supercluster based on a different definition, Laniakea, which is a basin of attraction centered on the Great Attractor. That structure would also include the Virgo Supercluster, therefore including the Milky Way, where Earth resides.

Follow-up studies still favored the traditional definition of superclusters as high-density regions such as Virgo and Hydra–Centaurus Superclusters, and proposed different terms for basins of attraction such as Laniakea. However, there is still no community consensus on an agreed definition of the term supercluster.

== See also ==
- Abell catalogue
- Large-scale structure of the universe
- List of Abell clusters
