= NGC 7196 =

Galaxy in the constellation Indus

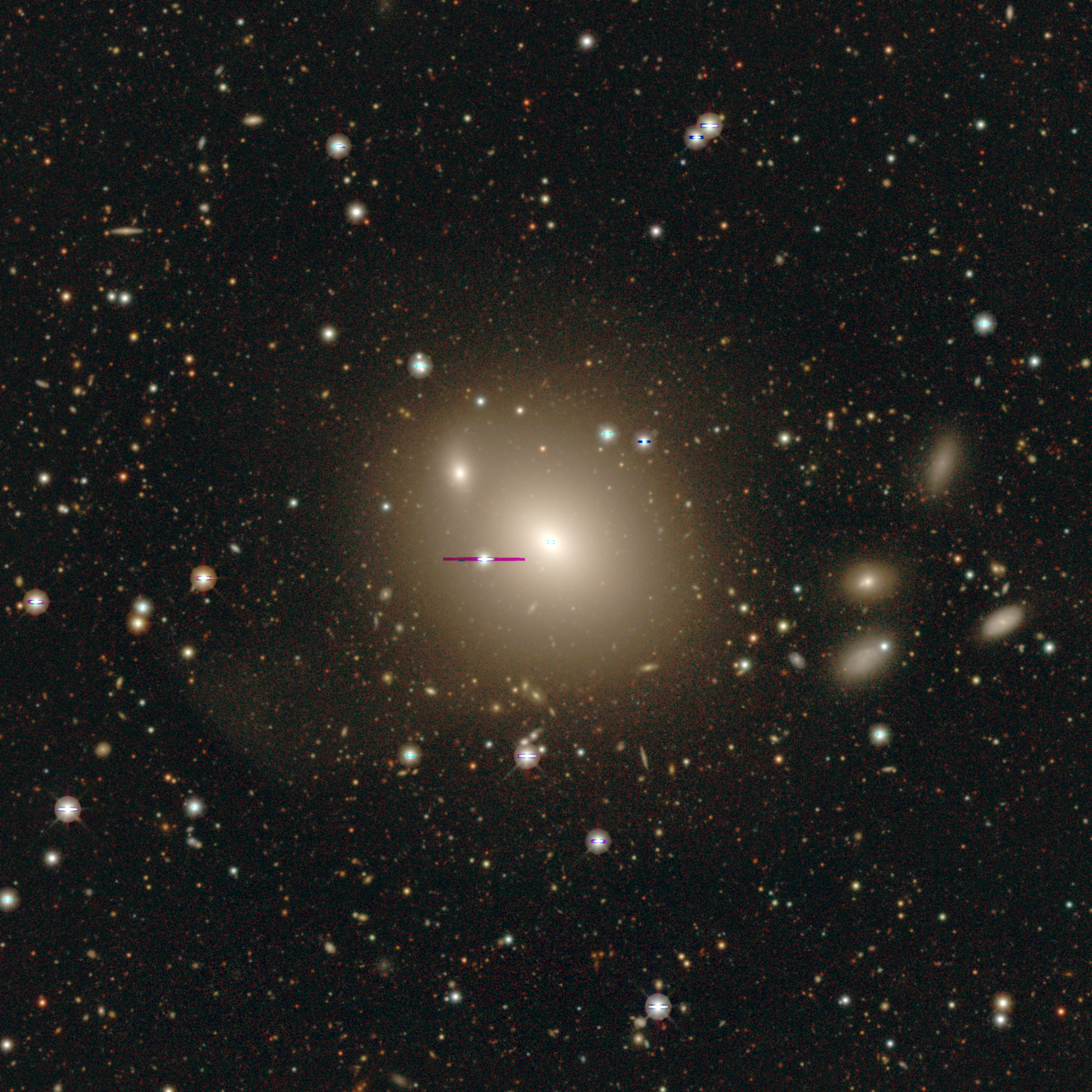
- NGC 7196 imaged by Legacy Surveys

Observation data (J2000 epoch)
- Constellation: Indus
- Right ascension: 22^{h} 05^{m} 54.8^{s}
- Declination: −50° 07′ 10″
- Redshift: 0.009750 ± 0.000063
- Heliocentric radial velocity: 2,923 ± 19 km/s
- Distance: 146 ± 48 Mly (45 ± 15 Mpc)
- Apparent magnitude (V): 11.4

Characteristics
- Type: E:
- Apparent size (V): 2.5′ × 1.8′

Other designations
- ESO 237- G 036, AM 2202-502, PGC 68020

NGC 7196 is an elliptical galaxy registered in the New General Catalogue. It is located in the constellation Indus at a distance of circa 150 million light years. It was discovered by the English astronomer John Herschel in 1834 using a 47.5 cm (18.7 inch) reflector.

NGC 7196 appears slightly distorted, with asymmetric outer isophotes. Asymmetry is also observed near the centre. The inner luminosity pattern resembles that of lenticular galaxies with circumscribing dust lanes, except that the feature is extremely close to the center. A shell has been observed around the galaxy. Shells are generally considered to have formed after the accretion of a smaller galaxy by a massive one. It has weak radio wave emission.

NGC 7196 is the foremost member of a galaxy group known as the NGC 7196 group, which also includes NGC 7200 and some dwarf elliptical and irregular galaxies. In the same galaxy cloud lies NGC 7168. NGC 7196 lies in the foreground of galaxy cluster known as Abell S0989.

== See also ==
- New General Catalogue
