= NGC 864 =

Barred spiral galaxy in Cetus

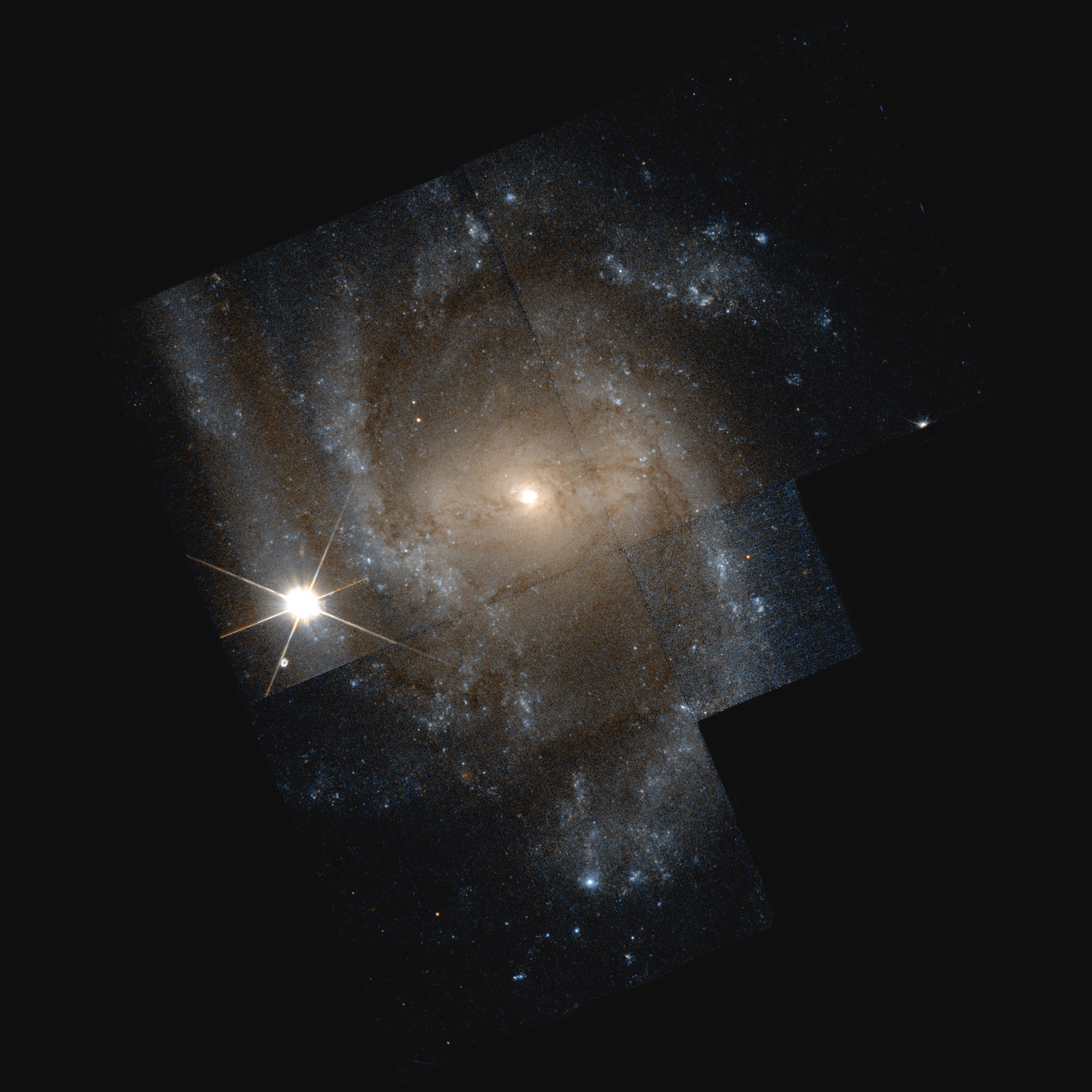

Observation data (J2000 epoch)
- Constellation: Cetus
- Right ascension: 02^{h} 15^{m} 27,64^{s}
- Declination: +06° 00′ 09.4″
- Redshift: +0.005210±0.000004
- Heliocentric radial velocity: 1562 ± 1 km/s
- Distance: 22.0 ± 1.5 (72 ± 5)×10^{6} ly)
- Apparent magnitude (V): 10.9
- Apparent magnitude (B): 11.4

Characteristics
- Type: SAB(rs)c

Other designations
- NGC 864 • UGC 1736 • PGC 8631 • CGCG 413-066 • MCG +01-06-061 • IRAS 02128+0546 • KUG 0211+276 • 2MASX J02152764+0600094 • CN 510

NGC 864 is a star-forming intermediate spiral galaxy located in the constellation Cetus. It's also classified as an isolated galaxy on the AMIGA (Analysis of the Interstellar Medium of Isolated Galaxies) catalogue as CIG 96. Its discovery and first description was realized by William Herschel in October 25th, 1785 and the findings made public through his Catalogue of Nebulae and Clusters of Stars, published in 1786.

Due to its diameter, declination and inclination, NGC 864 was selected in 2012 by a group of astronomers working at the Roque de los Muchachos Observatory as an object for kinematics study. Besides collecting data to help understand NGC 864's morphology, the objective of the project was to develop a method of flux-calibration for the new GHαFaS system on the William Herschel Telescope.

== Morphology ==
Galaxies are the basic building blocks of the Universe and their formation is of great interest in current astrophysical research. A galaxy's morphology is the result of both externally driven (like a galaxy merger) and internal evolution (as in a spiral pattern driven). Using ACAM and GHαFaS to produce high spectral resolution Hα images of NGC 864, and integral-field spectrograph data, astronomers were able to determine its bar presents bright regions of massive star formation at the ends, where two asymmetric arms arise.

NGC 864's outer spiral shows a flocculent pattern, leading some astronomers to classify it as a grand design galaxy.

== Integral HI spectrum asymmetry ==
Due to its isolation, one of the most interesting characteristics of this galaxy is its asymmetry. The asymmetry in galaxies located in high-density areas is often the result of galaxy-galaxy interaction, like in a merger. The origin of asymmetries in isolated galaxies however, is not well understood. Some astronomers suggest it could originate from long-lived dynamical instabilities.

In a study from 2005, astronomers realized an integral HI spectra of NGC 864, producing a detailed analysis of its HI density distribution and velocity field. The data showed the interstellar medium to be symmetric in velocity, but asymmetric in intensity, suggesting the possibility of its asymmetry being the result of an internal dynamical instability unlikely. The researchers speculate NGC 864's asymmetry might have been the result of a minor galaxy companion crossing the equatorial plane just outside the optical disc but still within the extended HI disc, causing the warp we can observe today.

== See also ==
- New General Catalogue
- List of NGC objects
