= Supergalactic coordinate system =

Astronomical coordinate system

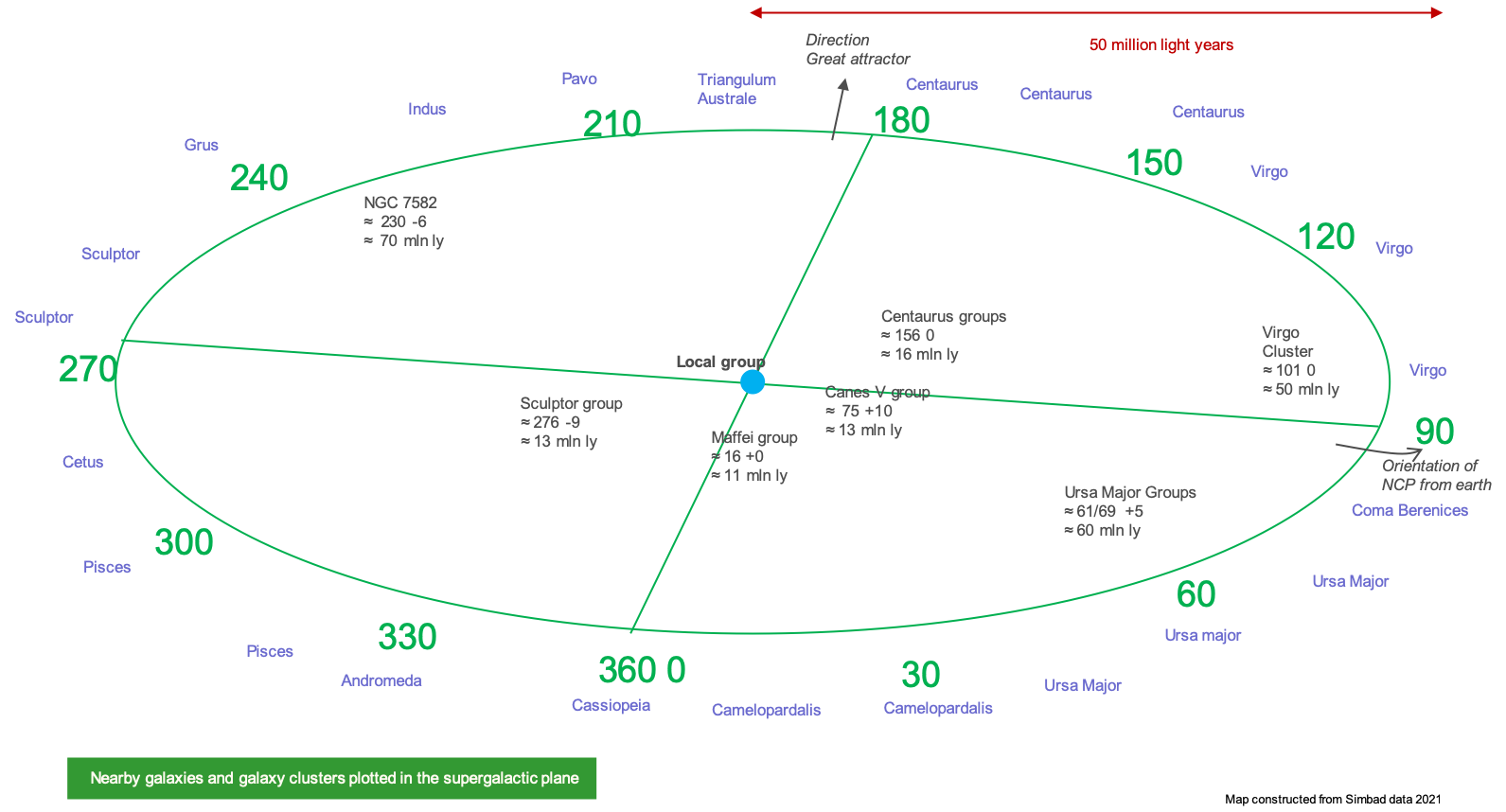
Galaxies and galaxy clusters < 50 Mly away from Earth plotted in the supergalactic plane

The supergalactic coordinate system is a reference frame for the supercluster of galaxies that contains the Milky Way galaxy, referenced to a local relatively flat collection of galaxy clusters used to define the Supergalactic plane.

The supergalactic plane is more or less perpendicular to the plane of the Milky Way; the angle is 83.68°. As viewed from Earth, the plane traces a great circle across the sky through the following constellations:

- Cassiopeia (in the Milky Way galactic plane)
- Camelopardalis
- Ursa Major
- Coma Berenices (near the Milky Way galactic north pole)
- Virgo
- Centaurus
- Circinus (in the galactic plane)
- Triangulum Australe
- Pavo
- Indus
- Grus
- Sculptor (near the galactic south pole)
- Cetus
- Pisces
- Andromeda
- Perseus

== History ==
In the 1950s the astronomer Gérard de Vaucouleurs recognized the existence of a flattened “local supercluster” from the Shapley-Ames Catalog in the environment of the Milky Way. He noticed that when one plots nearby galaxies in 3D, they lie more or less on a plane. A flattened distribution of nebulae had earlier been noted by William Herschel. Vera Rubin had also identified the supergalactic plane in the 1950s, but her data remained unpublished. The plane delineated by various galaxies defined in 1976 the equator of the supergalactic coordinate system de Vaucouleurs developed. In years thereafter with more observation data available de Vaucouleurs' and Rubin's findings about the existence of the plane proved right.

Based on the supergalactic coordinate system of de Vaucouleurs, surveys in recent years determined the positions of nearby galaxy clusters relative to the supergalactic plane. Amongst others the Virgo Cluster, the Norma Cluster (including the Great Attractor), the Coma Cluster, the Perseus–Pisces Supercluster, the Hydra Cluster, the Centaurus Cluster, the Pisces-Cetus Supercluster and the Shapley Concentration were found to be near the supergalactic plane.

== Definition ==
The supergalactic coordinate system is a spherical coordinate system in which the equator lies in the supergalactic plane.

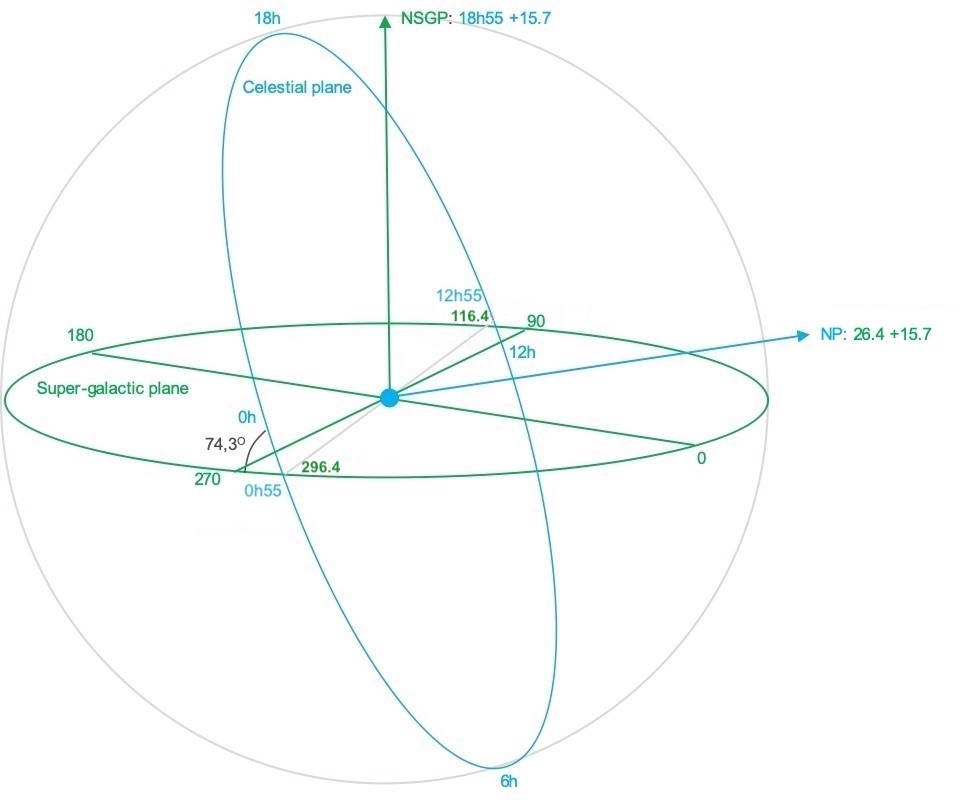
Supergalactic and celestial plane

By convention, supergalactic latitude is usually abbreviated SGB, and supergalactic longitude as SGL, by analogy to b and l conventionally used for galactic coordinates.

- The zero point (SGL = 0°, SGB = 0°) lies in the constellation Cassiopeia, coincides with (l_{x} = 137.37°, b_{x} = 0°) and was chosen for convenience to lie along the line where the supergalactic plane intersects with the galactic plane. In J2000 equatorial coordinates, this is approximately RA = 2.82^{h}, Dec = +59.5°.
- The origin essentially coincides with the Earth, because the supergalactic plane is identified as a plane observed from Earth.
- The north supergalactic pole (SGB = 90°) lies in the constellation Hercules at galactic coordinates (l_{z} = 47.37°, b_{z} = +6.32°), or approximately RA = 18.9^{h}, Dec = +15.7°.

The transformation from a triple of Cartesian supergalactic coordinates to a triple of galactic coordinates is

$$\begin{bmatrix} x \\ y \\ z\end{bmatrix}_\text{gal} =
\begin{bmatrix}
\cos l_x \cos b_x & \sin l_z \cos b_z \sin b_x - \sin b_z \sin l_x \cos b_x & \cos l_z \cos b_z \\
\sin l_x \cos b_x & \sin b_z \cos l_x \cos b_x - \cos l_z \cos b_z \sin b_x & \sin l_z \cos b_z \\
\sin b_x & \cos b_z \cos b_x \sin\left(l_x - l_z\right)                       & \sin b_z
\end{bmatrix}
\begin{bmatrix}x \\ y \\ z\end{bmatrix}_\text{superg}$$

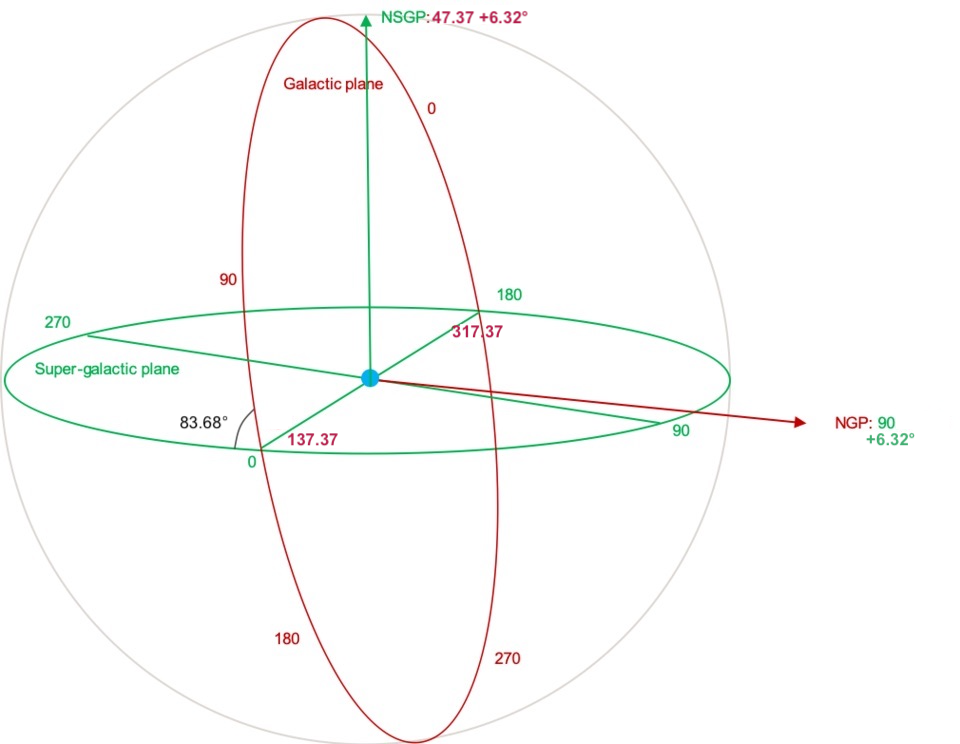
Supergalactic and galactic plane

The left column in this matrix is the image of the origin of the supergalactic system in the galactic system, the right column in this matrix is the image of the north pole of the supergalactic coordinates in the galactic system, and the middle column is the cross product (to complete the right-handed coordinate system).

The corresponding cartesian coordinate system allows points to be specified by coordinates (SGX, SGY, SGZ). In this system the supergalactic z-axis points towards the north supergalactic pole, the supergalactic x-axis points towards the zero point, and the supergalactic y-axis is perpendicular to both.

== See also ==
- Coordinate system
- Celestial coordinate system
