= Supergalactic plane =

Local-universe structure

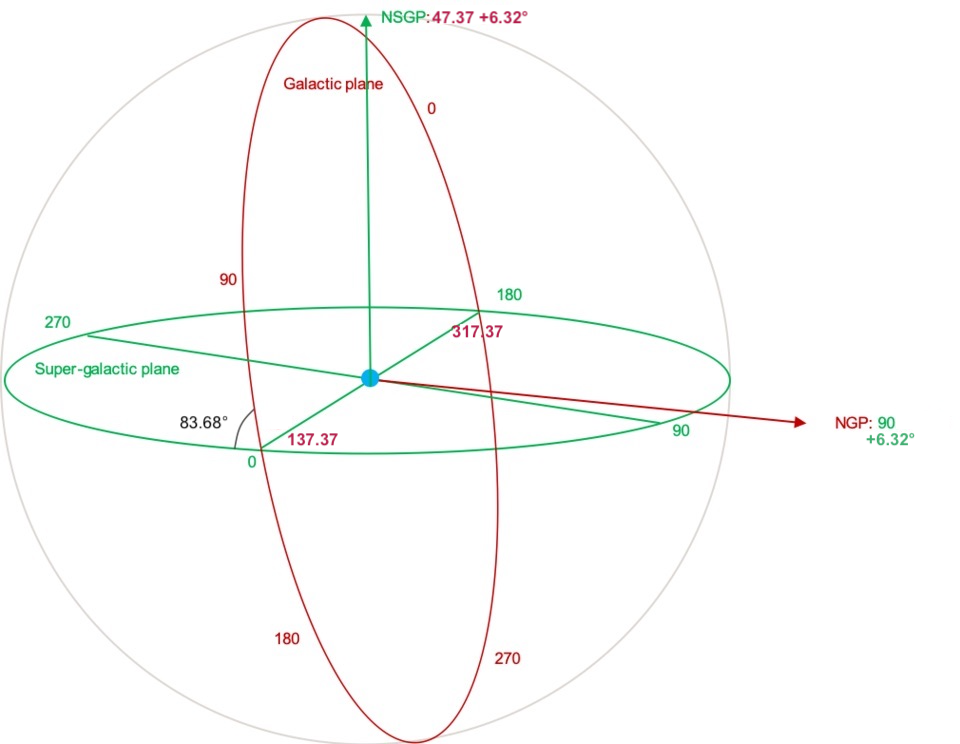
Supergalactic and galactic plane

The Supergalactic plane (SGP) is a plane roughly perpendicular to the Galactic plane of the Milky Way. It represents a planar structure in the local distribution of galaxies. The Milky Way is also located within the Supergalactic Plane.

The distinction of the Supergalactic plane lies in the observations of it being filled with more proportion of one type of galaxies (elliptical galaxy) while the other main type of galaxies (disc galaxy – like our Milky Way with spiral arms) is largely missing from this Supergalactic plane.

== Importance ==
=== Differences in galaxies distribution ===
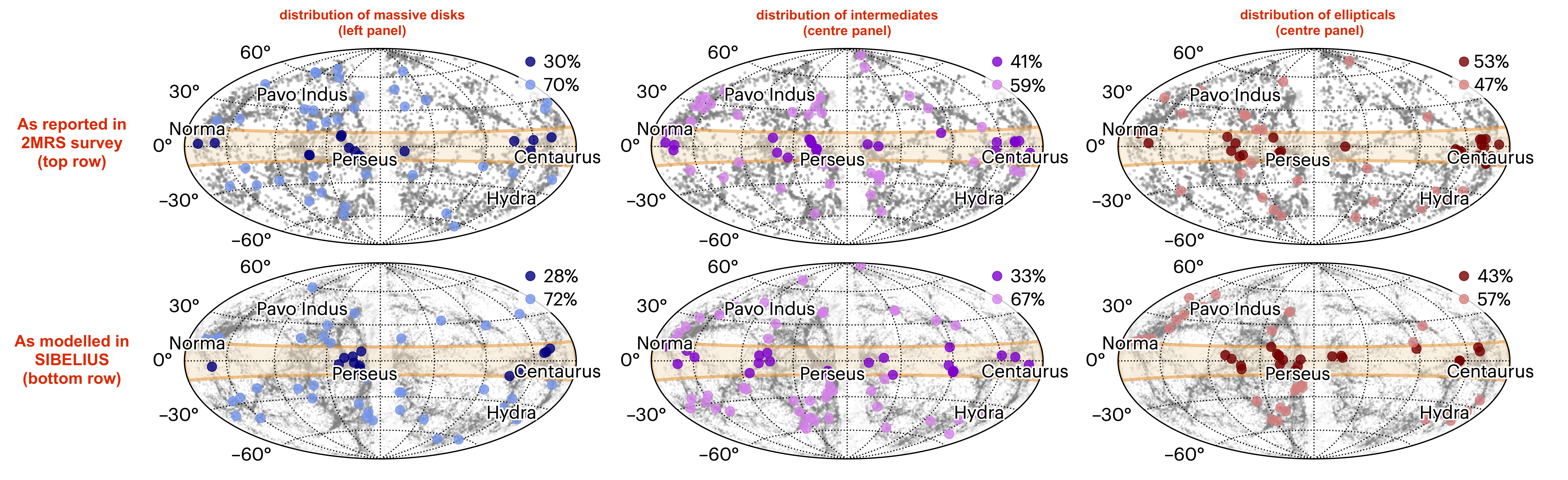
Hammer projection in supergalactic coordinates of the distribution of the most massive disks (left), intermediates (centre) and ellipticals (right) in the redshift range of 0.01 < z < 0.02, as reported in the 2MRS survey (top) and as modelled in SIBELIUS (bottom). The shaded areas correspond to |sin(SGB)| <0.2(−11.5⁰ ≤ SGB ≤ 11.5⁰) around the supergalactic equator. In both the 2MRS data and the SIBELIUS simulation, a significantly higher fraction of massive ellipticals than of massive disks lie close to the supergalactic plane.

Observations of the number of bright galaxies of each type within the supergalactic plane show a excess of elliptical galaxies and a deficit of spiral ones like the Milky Way. Simulations of the development of these galaxies based on the Lambda-CDM model of the Big Bang theory concluded that different distributions of elliptical and disc galaxies is a consequence of interactions among the galaxies. The supergalactic plane has a higher density of galaxies, increasing the chance of interaction and resulting conversion of spiral galaxies into elliptical ones. Outside the Supergalactic Plane, the spiral galaxies retain their spiral structures due to their relative isolation.

== Extent and Orientation ==
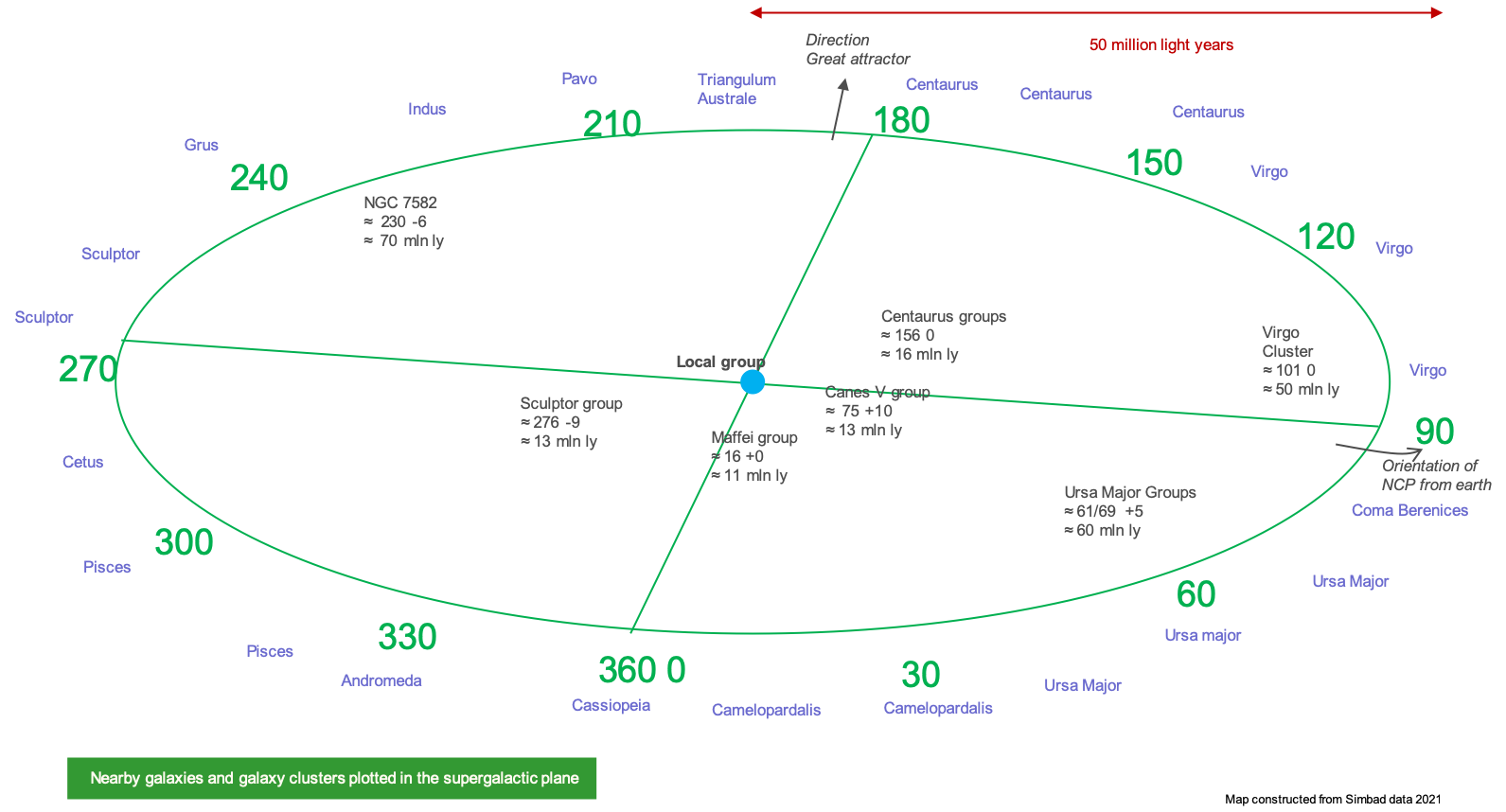
Galaxies and galaxy clusters < 50 Mly away from Earth plotted in the supergalactic plane

The orientation of this plane depends on the radius at which galaxies are being sampled.

The SGP is observed and considered to be a somewhat uniform or homogenous plane largely upto 40 h^{−1} Mpc (or about 57 Mpc if dimensionless hubble constant, h is considered = 0.7, or which equals approx 90 Mly) which implies roughly the size of the Local Volume of galaxies. However, the planar structure is observed to be more like a dumbbell at radius of 50 h^{−1} Mpc where the Great Attractor and Perseus–Pisces superclusters take precedence.

For the sake of comparison, the Local Group of galaxies which includes our Milky Way and also the Andromeda Galaxy is about 5 Mpc in diameter.

== See also ==
- Supergalactic coordinate system
- Galactic plane
