= Richard R. Fisher =

American astrophysicist

Richard R. Fisher is an American astrophysicist who worked in academia and at NASA. He retired in 2012.

Fisher received his BA with honors from Grinnell College in 1961 and his PhD in astrogeophysics from University of Colorado in 1965. In May 2019 he was awarded the degree of Doctor of Science by Grinnell College. He was an assistant professor at University of Hawaii from 1965 to 1971, a staff scientist and then section head at the Sacramento Peak Observatory from 1971 to 1976, and worked at the National Center for Atmospheric Research from 1975 to 1991. He joined NASA in 1991 as the branch chief for the Solar Physics Branch at the Goddard Space Flight Center from 1991 to 1998, was the laboratory chief for the Laboratory for Astrophysics and Solar Physics at Goddard from 1998 to 2002. He was a primary investigator on the Spartan and other satellite projects that were launched from several Space Shuttle missions STS-56, STS-64, STS-69, STS-87, and STS-95, which measured solar wind and other solar emissions, and he was responsible for coordinating the work of Spartan with the European Solar and Heliospheric Observatory.

From 2002 until his retirement in 2012, he was the director of the Sun-Earth Connections Division, deputy director of the Earth–Sun Systems Division and then director of the Heliophysics Division at NASA headquarters in Washington, D.C. As director of the Heliophysics Division, his division flew more satellites than any other NASA division, and he was responsible for a $630 million annual budget and had to manage high expectations for solar research within the budgetary restraints caused by the 2007-2009 US recession. He was responsible for the development and launch of the Solar Dynamics Observatory in 2010, which Fisher said "would do for heliophysics what the Hubble Space Telescope has done for astrophysics in general", and the first images from which were widely hailed in the media.

He was a spokesman for NASA in 2010 when it announced that the sun was entering a cycle of increasingly powerful storms that would peak in 2013. He also announced the release of NASA's second smart phone app, the 3D sun, which allowed people to monitor the sun in realtime.

He was the recipient of a Presidential Rank Award in the Senior Executive Service in 2007 and was presented with NASA's Distinguished Service Medal in 2011.

It was said of him in 2014 that "If it's solar astronomy at NASA, it's Dick Fisher".
