= R. Brent Tully =

American astronomer (born 1943)

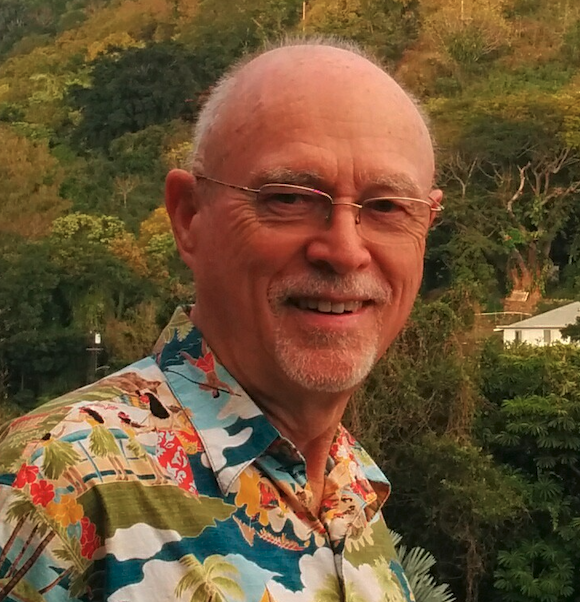
- Born: Richard Brent Tully; March 9, 1943; Toronto, Ontario, Canada
- Education: University of British Columbia (BS); University of Maryland (PhD)
- Known for: Tully–Fisher relation; discovery of the South Pole Wall; Laniakea Supercluster
- Awards: Gruber Prize in Cosmology
- Scientific career
- Fields: Astronomy; Cosmology
- Workplaces: Institute for Astronomy at the University of Hawaiʻi at Mānoa
- Thesis: The Kinematics and Dynamics of M51. III. The Spiral Structure (1972)

Richard Brent Tully (born March 9, 1943) is a Canadian-born American astronomer and cosmologist. He is known for his work on the large-scale structure of the universe, the distances to galaxies, and the mapping of cosmic flows. Tully is Emeritus Astronomer at the Institute for Astronomy at the University of Hawaiʻi at Mānoa in Honolulu, where he has conducted research for more than four decades.

== Early life and education ==
Tully was born in Toronto, Ontario, Canada, and raised in Vancouver, British Columbia. He received a Bachelor’s degree from the University of British Columbia and a Ph.D. in astronomy from the University of Maryland in 1972. After completing his doctorate, he spent two years as a postdoctoral researcher in Marseille, France before joining the faculty at the Institute for Astronomy in Hawaiʻi in 1975.

Tully’s PhD dissertation in 1972 involved construction of an imaging Fabry-Perot interferometer and the first observations at optical wavelengths of the two-dimensional velocity field of a galaxy, clarifying the source of the spiral structure in Messier 51, the Whirlpool galaxy.

== Career and research ==
Tully’s research focuses on the astrophysics of galaxies, the large-scale structure of the cosmos, and the distance scale of the universe.

=== Tully–Fisher Relation ===
In 1977, with colleague J. Richard Fisher, Tully published what became known as the Tully–Fisher relation, an empirical correlation between the rotational velocity of a spiral galaxy and its luminosity. This relation allows astronomers to estimate a galaxy’s distance by comparing its intrinsic brightness to its observed brightness, and it remains a fundamental tool in extragalactic astronomy.

=== Galaxy Mapping and Catalogs ===
In 1988 Tully published The Nearby Galaxies Catalog and the Nearby Galaxies Atlas, which provided three-dimensional positions for thousands of galaxies in the local universe. These works were among the first comprehensive efforts to depict the distribution of galaxies in space. Subsequent distance catalogs published by Tully and collaborators now include measurements for 55,000 galaxies, the largest assembly of directly measured galaxy distances available. Tully curates his own catalogs and others extracted from the literature in the publicly accessible Extragalactic Distance Database.

=== Cosmicflows and Large-Scale Structure ===
Tully has played a leading role in the Cosmicflows program, which compiles galaxy distances and peculiar velocities (motions relative to cosmic expansion). Data from this program have been used to map the flows of galaxies and the distribution of matter, including dark matter, within a volume of hundreds of millions of light-years around Earth.

Tully and collaborators identified and named the Laniakea Supercluster, the vast supercluster of which the Milky Way is a part, and contributed to the discovery of the South Pole Wall, a large filament of galaxies in the nearby universe.

== Scientific contributions ==
Since 1982, Tully’s work has provided insights into the large-scale web-like structure of the universe, characterized by filaments of galaxies and superclusters separated by vast voids. His studies of the local universe have contributed to broader understanding of how gravitational interaction and dark matter shape cosmic structure.

Building on his foundational work in galaxy distances, Tully led successive phases of the Cosmicflows project, an international collaboration aimed at compiling accurate galaxy distances and peculiar velocities.

He has participated in the determination of precision distances based on the magnitudes of stars at the tip of the red giant branch in over 500 nearby galaxies with Hubble Space Telescope and is continuing observations with James Webb Space Telescope.

Cosmicflows‑2 assembled measurements for over 8,000 galaxies using multiple independent methods including the Tully–Fisher relation, Cepheid variables, surface brightness fluctuations, and Type Ia supernovae providing a calibrated distance scale for studying cosmic expansion and motions. Cosmicflows‑3 expanded the dataset to nearly 18,000 galaxies by incorporating additional measurements, such as infrared photometry from the Spitzer Space Telescope and fundamental plane distances, enabling more detailed analyses of local cosmic flows, voids, and walls. Cosmicflows‑4 further increased the compilation to more than 55,000 galaxies, employing eight distinct distance measurement techniques, including photometric, kinematic, and supernova indicators, creating one of the most comprehensive three‑dimensional datasets of extragalactic distances to date. The dataset has been instrumental in mapping galaxy motions and the gravitational influence of large-scale structures across the nearby universe.

== Honors and awards ==
- Gruber Prize in Cosmology (2014), shared with Jaan Einasto, Kenneth Freeman, and Sidney van den Bergh, for contributions to Near Field Cosmology, the study of the nearby universe’s structure.
- Viktor Ambartsumian International Prize (2014).
- Wempe Award from the Leibniz Institute for Astrophysics Potsdam, honoring his work on galaxy structure.
- University of Maryland Distinguished Alumnus Award and research excellence medals from the University of Hawaiʻi.

== Selected Publications ==
- Tully, R. Brent (1974). "The Kinematics and Dynamics of M51. III. The Spiral Structure". The Astrophysical Journal Supplement Series. 27: 449. Bibcode:1974ApJS...27..449T. doi:10.1086/190306. ISSN 0067-0049.
- B., Tully, R.; R., Fisher, J. (1977). "A new method of determining distances to galaxies". Astronomy and Astrophysics. 54: 661. Bibcode:1977A&A....54..661T. ISSN 0004-6361. Archived from the original on 2025-06-27.
- Tully, R. B. (1982). "The Local Supercluster". The Astrophysical Journal. 257: 389. Bibcode:1982ApJ...257..389T. doi:10.1086/159999. ISSN 0004-637X.
- Aaronson, M.; Huchra, J.; Mould, J.; Schechter, P. L.; Tully, R. B. (1982). "The velocity field in the local supercluster". The Astrophysical Journal. 258: 64. Bibcode:1982ApJ...258...64A. doi:10.1086/160053. ISSN 0004-637X.
- Tully, R. B.; Shaya, E. J. (1984). "Infall of galaxies into the Virgo cluster and some cosmological constraints". The Astrophysical Journal. 281: 31. Bibcode:1984ApJ...281...31T. doi:10.1086/162073. ISSN 0004-637X.
- Tully, R. B. (1986). "Alignment of clusters and galaxies on scales up to 0.1 C". The Astrophysical Journal. 303: 25. Bibcode:1986ApJ...303...25T. doi:10.1086/164049. ISSN 0004-637X.
- Tully, R. Brent; Kourkchi, Ehsan; Courtois, Hélène M.; Anand, Gagandeep S.; Blakeslee, John P.; Brout, Dillon; Jaeger, Thomas de; Dupuy, Alexandra; Guinet, Daniel; Howlett, Cullan; Jensen, Joseph B.; Pomarède, Daniel; Rizzi, Luca; Rubin, David; Said, Khaled (2023-02-01). "Cosmicflows-4". The Astrophysical Journal. 944 (1): 94. arXiv:2209.11238. Bibcode:2023ApJ...944...94T. doi:10.3847/1538-4357/ac94d8. ISSN 0004-637X.
- Tully, R. Brent; Fisher, J. Richard (1987). Nearby galaxies atlas (1. publ ed.). Cambridge: Cambridge Univ. Pr. ISBN 978-0-521-30136-7.
- Tully, R. Brent (1988). Nearby galaxies catalog. Cambridge; New York: Cambridge University Press. ISBN 978-0-521-35299-4.
- Tully, R. Brent; Kourkchi, Ehsan; Courtois, Hélène M.; Anand, Gagandeep S.; Blakeslee, John P.; Brout, Dillon; Jaeger, Thomas de; Dupuy, Alexandra; Guinet, Daniel (2022-12-28), "Cosmicflows-4", The Astrophysical Journal, 944 (1): 94, arXiv:2209.11238, Bibcode:2023ApJ...944...94T, doi:10.3847/1538-4357/ac94d8

== See also ==
- Large-scale structure of the cosmos
