= Sculptor Void =

Type of galaxy void

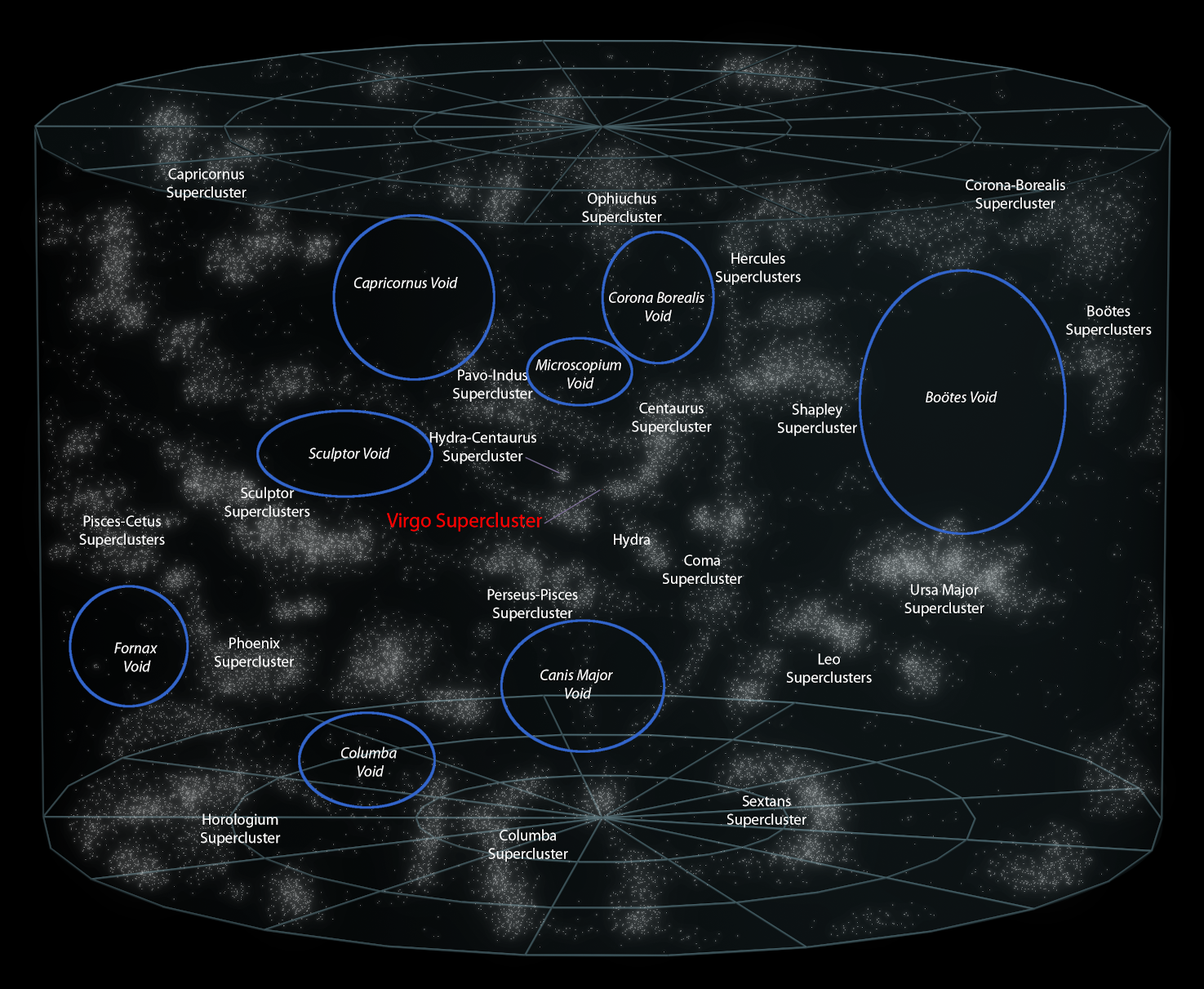
A map of galaxy voids

The Sculptor Void is a large region of relatively low galaxy density located in the direction of the constellation Sculptor. It is one of the cosmic voids that form part of the large-scale structure of the universe, where galaxies, clusters, and filaments surround vast underdense regions.

Cosmic voids are enormous spaces containing significantly fewer galaxies than average. They are typically tens to hundreds of megaparsecs across and arise naturally during the process of structure formation in the universe. Matter gradually flows out of these regions toward surrounding filaments and galaxy clusters, leaving voids comparatively empty.

The Sculptor Void lies in a part of the sky that also contains several nearby galaxy groups, including the Sculptor Group. The region has been studied through galaxy redshift surveys that map the distribution of galaxies in three dimensions, revealing the presence of large underdense regions between filaments and galaxy walls.

Like other voids in the cosmic web, the Sculptor Void is not completely empty. A small number of isolated galaxies and faint dwarf systems may still be present within the region, although their density is much lower than the cosmic average.

== See also ==
- Large-scale structure of the universe
