= Perseus–Pisces Supercluster =

Galaxy supercluster in the constellations Perseus and Pisces

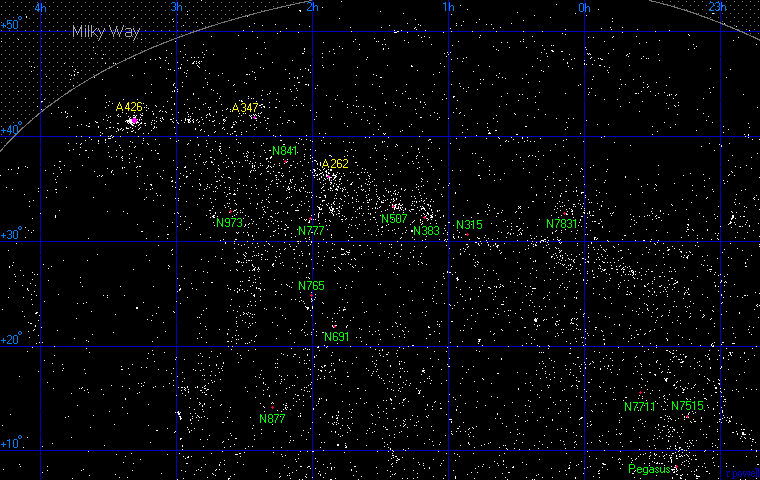
- A map of the Perseus-Pisces Supercluster

Observation data (Epoch )
- Constellation(s): Perseus, Pisces
- Right ascension: 01^{h} 50^{m}
- Declination: +36° 00′
- Distance: 76.7 Mpc (250 Mly)

Other designations
- SCl 40, Perseus–Pisces Chain, Perseus–Pisces Wall, Perseus–Pisces Complex, Perseus–Pisces Filament

The Perseus–Pisces Supercluster (SCl 40) or Perseus–Pisces Filament is one of the largest known structures in the universe. Even at a distance of 250 million light-years, this chain of galaxy clusters extends more than 40° across the northern winter sky. The Perseus–Pisces Supercluster is one of two dominant concentrations of galaxies (the other being the Laniakea Supercluster) in the nearby universe (within 300 million light-years). This supercluster also borders a prominent void, the Taurus Void, and is part of the Perseus–Pegasus Filament, which stretches for roughly a billion light years.

== Clusters ==
The main clusters of the Perseus–Pisces Supercluster are Abell 262, Abell 347, and Abell 426. The clusters in the Pisces region (SCL 24) are Abell 76, Abell 119, Abell 147, Abell 160, Abell 193, Abell 168 and Abell 195.

== See also ==
- Abell catalogue
- Large-scale structure of the universe
- List of Abell clusters
