= Daniel Pomarède =

French astrophysicist

- Born: October 3, 1971 (age 55)
- Education: Ph.D in particle physics and cosmology
- Known for: Laniakea Supercluster, Ho'oleilana, South Pole Wall, Dipole Repeller
- Scientific career
- Fields: Astrophysics
- Workplaces: CEA Paris-Saclay University

Daniel Pomarède (born October 3, 1971) is a staff scientist at the Institute of Research into the Fundamental Laws of the Universe, CEA Paris-Saclay University. He co-discovered Laniakea, our home supercluster of galaxies, and Ho'oleilana, a spherical shell-like structure 1 billion light-years in diameter found in the distribution of galaxies, possibly the remnant of a Baryon Acoustic Oscillation. Specialized in data visualization and cosmography, a branch of cosmology dedicated to mapping the Universe, he also co-authored the discoveries of the Dipole Repeller and of the Cold Spot Repeller, two large influential cosmic voids, and the discovery of the South Pole Wall, a large-scale structure located in the direction of the south celestial pole beyond the southern frontiers of Laniakea.

Daniel Pomarède is science editor of Galaxy Science Fiction and If (magazine).

== Biography ==
Daniel Pomarède graduated from the Interuniversity Magister degree in Physics of the Ecole Normale Supérieure de Paris and Paris Universities (1991–1994), training in diverse research projects: experimental atomic physics in the group led by Marie-Anne Bouchiat at Kastler–Brossel Laboratory, waveguide optics at the Laser Research Group, University of Manchester, supersymmetry at CEA Theoretical Physics Department in Saclay.

He served overseas as a national service scientific cooperant at Brookhaven National Laboratory in New York and got a Master of Science degree from the University of South Carolina, contributing to the preparation and analysis of nuclear physics experiments on the spin structure of the nucleon.

In 1999, he completed his Ph.D. in particle physics and cosmology at the Laboratoire de Physique Nucléaire des Hautes Energies at Ecole Polytechnique with a thesis on the search for cosmological antimatter in TeV cosmic rays, using the 10m Imaging Atmospheric Cerenkov Telescope at the F.L. Whipple Observatory in Arizona. He then went on postdoctoral positions at CEA Service de Physique des Particules in Saclay and at the Physics Department of the University of Rome, La Sapienza, to work on the preparation of the ATLAS Experiment at CERN. Back in Saclay, he co-founded in 2005 the COAST Computational Astrophysics Program dedicated to supercomputer simulations in astronomy, in the context of which he developed the SDvision Saclay Data Visualization software. As of 2010 he is applying these data visualization and analysis techniques in the field of cosmography.

== Career ==
=== Research work ===
Daniel Pomarède co-authored several papers in the field of cosmography, the mapping of large-scale matter distribution and kinematics of the observable universe, with the following most significant discoveries:

- Discovery of the Laniakea Supercluster (2014). This structure was discovered in the velocity field inferred from the Cosmicflows-2 catalogue of peculiar velocities and distances of galaxies, where flowlines within a three-dimensional basin of attraction of typical size 160 Mpc converge on a single attractor (the Great Attractor). The volume enclosing this basin of attraction draws the frontiers of the supercluster within which is located in the Milky Way. The structure is named Laniakea, association of the Hawaiian terms Lani, heaven, and Akea, immense, to honor the Polynesian navigators and astronomers who used stars and oceanic currents to guide themselves in the immensity of the Pacific Ocean. This discovery makes the cover of Nature, September 4, 2014 edition and is accompanied by a news article, a News & Views article, an editorial, and a Nature Video
- Discovery of the Dipole Repeller (2017). The visualization and analysis of cosmic flows revealed that the velocity field diverges from a region, presumably a large void, that is antialigned with the motion of the Milky Way galaxy at 630 km/s (which causes a dipole in the temperature distribution of the Cosmic Microwave Background radiation). Matter flowing from underdense to overdense regions, such an underdense region of the Universe act as effective repeller, though the only fundamental force in action is gravitation, an attractive force. The influence of this repeller (push) on our motion is found to be comparable in amplitude to that of the Shapley Supercluster (pull). This discovery was published in the newly created Nature Astronomy journal.
- Discovery of the Cold Spot Repeller (2017). The analysis of the more extensive Cosmicflows-3 catalogue of galaxies revealed the presence of a major basin of repulsion located in the approximate direction of the Cold Spot observed in the map of the Cosmic microwave background temperature fluctuations. It has been hypothetized that this cold spot might be caused by large voids, or supervoids. The discovery of the repeller provides increased evidence of a substantial void or succession of lesser voids, in the Cold Spot directions.
- Discovery of the South Pole Wall (2020). The South Pole Wall is a large scale structure observed in the direction of the south celestial pole. With its heart located in the constellation Chamaeleon, this filament embraces the southernmost frontiers of the Laniakea supercluster. It is roughly the same size as the Sloan Great Wall, at half the distance.
- Discovery of Ho'oleilana (2023), a spherical shell-like structure 1 billion light-years in diameter, observed in the distribution of relatively nearby galaxies. This structure is interpreted as the fossil of a Baryon Acoustic Oscillation, produced in the primordial plasma.

== Public work ==
=== Videos ===
Cosmography studies published in scientific journals offer maps not only in the form of standard figures, but also in the form of extensive videos and interactive visualizations. Intended primarily for the specialists in the field of cosmology, these video maps turned out to be of interest to the general public.

A collection of such products developed by Pomarède and fellow co-authors aggregated approximately one million views on platforms such as Vimeo, YouTube and Sketchfab:

- "Cosmography of the Local Universe" is a 17 minutes long video exploring the structure of the nearby universe with a particular emphasis on the Great Attractor region, using the data from the Cosmicflows-1 catalogue of galaxies. Discover Magazine called it "The Most Amazing Map You’ll See Today (No Matter What Day It Is)"; "New Science of Cosmography Reveals 3-D Map of the Local Universe" (MIT Technology Review); "Spectacular Cosmographic Maps Chart Galaxies and Superclusters in Local Universe" (Wired); "This video is a trip – through the known universe" (Los Angeles Times); "Astronomers create stunning 3D space maps of Earth’s nearest galaxies" (METRO); "Cosmic Cartography: Here Is Your (Local) Universe" (Scientific American).
- The discovery of Laniakea is described in a Nature Video "Laniakea: Our home supercluster" which collected 7.9 million views . This video uses elements from "Cosmography of the Local Universe" and from the video "The Laniakea Supercluster of galaxies" Laniakea: Our Supercluster of Galaxies that is part of the scientific article.
- "Action Dynamics of the Local Supercluster" Action Dynamics of the Local Supercluster - Download Free 3D model by Daniel Pomarède (@pomarede) [0981969] is presumably the first 4D interactive visualization ever included in a scientific journal article. Published in the Astrophysical Journal Action Dynamics of the Local Supercluster, this interactive animation shows the fully nonlinear gravitationally induced trajectories of a nearly complete set of galaxies, groups, and clusters in the Local Supercluster constructed in a Numerical Action Method (NAM) model constrained by data from the Cosmicflows survey and various distance indicators, with a time evolution running from the past 13.25 billion years to present.
- ‘The Cosmic V-Web" The Cosmic V-Web offers both an 11 minutes-long video and a 3D interactive visualization of a map of the Cosmic Web inferred from the analysis of the velocity field, published in The Astrophysical Journal The Cosmic V-Web.
- "Cosmicflows-3: Cosmography of the Local Void" Cosmicflows-3: Cosmography of the Local Void is an 11 minutes long video map of the Local Void, a large underdense region of the Universe, on the outskirts of which is located our galaxy the Milky Way, and of its relation with other cosmic voids and major overdense neighbors, published in The Astrophysical Journal Cosmicflows-3: Cosmography of the Local Void
- "The Cold-Spot Repeller" The Cold-Spot Repeller - Download Free 3D model by Daniel Pomarède (@pomarede) [eab86b4] - Sketchfab is an interactive visualization mapping the gravitational potential field and flow obtained with the Cosmicflows-3 catalog of galaxies peculiar velocities. Published in the Astrophysical Journal Letters Cosmicflows-3: Cold Spot Repeller?, it shows the 3D structure of flow diverging from the Cold Spot Repeller and the Dipole Repeller, and converging dominantly on the Shapley Attractor.

=== Public Conferences ===
- Fleurance Astronomy Festival 2017
- The Mysteries of the 21st century in Saint-Tropez 2019
- The Astronomy Week 2016 in Nantes SAN : Laniakea, notre superamas de galaxies

=== Radio Programs ===
- France Culture, La Méthode Scientifique « Cosmos : les métamorphoses du vide » Cosmos : les métamorphoses du vide
- France Culture, La Méthode Scientifique « Filaments galactiques, un univers en dentelle » Filaments galactiques, un univers en dentelle
- France Inter, La Tête au Carré « Laniakea, un continent de galaxies » Laniakea, un continent de galaxies du 11 septembre 2014 - France Inter
- France Inter, La Tête au Carré, La une de la science Histoire des maladies infectieuses
