= PGC 2456 =

Galaxy in the constellation Cetus

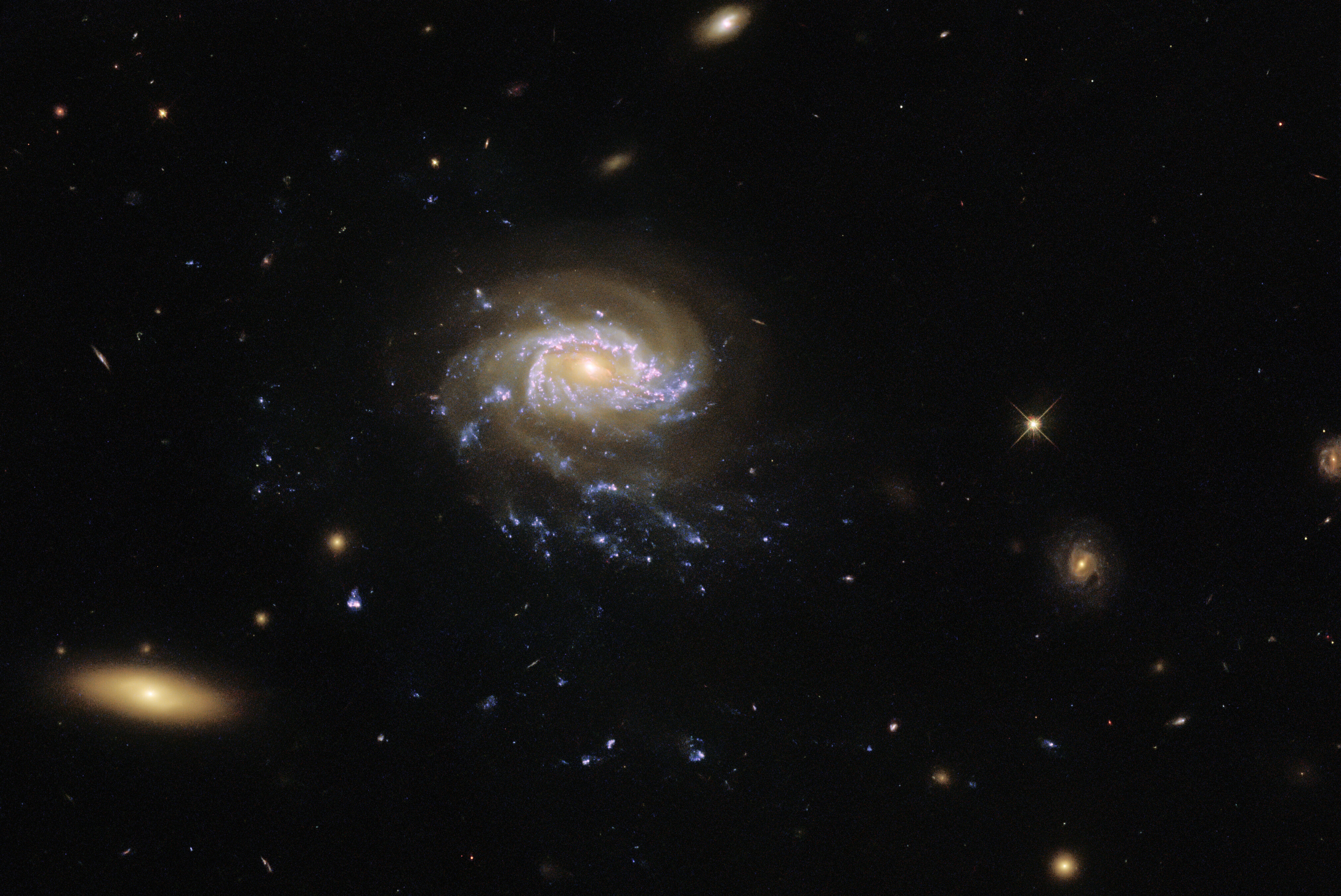
- Hubble Space Telescope of PGC 2456 and its surrounding galaxies PGC 2800504 and 2MASX J00413329-0914569

Observation data (J2000 epoch)
- Constellation: Cetus
- Right ascension: 00h 41m 30.29s
- Declination: -09d 15m 45.85s
- Redshift: 0.044674
- Distance: 617 Mly (189.17 Mpc)
- Group or cluster: Abell 85
- Apparent magnitude (V): 0.10
- Apparent magnitude (B): 0.13

Characteristics
- Type: cD, Sy

Other designations
- PGC 2456, PGC 93189, NVSS J004130-091545, KAZ 364, WINGS J004130.29-091546.0, NSA 127503, 2CXO J001430.3-091546, JO201

PGC 2456 known as KAZ 364 and JO201, is a spiral galaxy located in the constellation of Cetus. It is located 617 million light-years away from the Solar System. A member of Abell 85, PGC 2456 lies 360 kiloparsecs from the brightest cluster galaxy, Holmberg 15A.

PGC 2456 contains an active galactic nucleus. It is a low-excitation radio galaxy, with a stellar mass of 3.6 × 10^{10} M_{☉}.

PGC 2456 is considered a jellyfish galaxy due to the fact the tendrils are seen drifting downwards from its core. It exhibits intensive star formation in its tendrils and is the Ultraviolet-brightest cluster galaxy in Abell 85.

Such jellyfish galaxies are formed when galaxies like PGC 2456, moves through high speeds across the galaxy clusters, causing ram pressure to strip gas. According to studies, researchers estimated PGC 2456 might have lost about 50% of its mass when undergoing ram-pressure stripping.

== See also ==
- PGC 29820
- PGC 1228197
- Jellyfish galaxy
