= PGC 1228197 =

Galaxy located in the constellation Aquarius

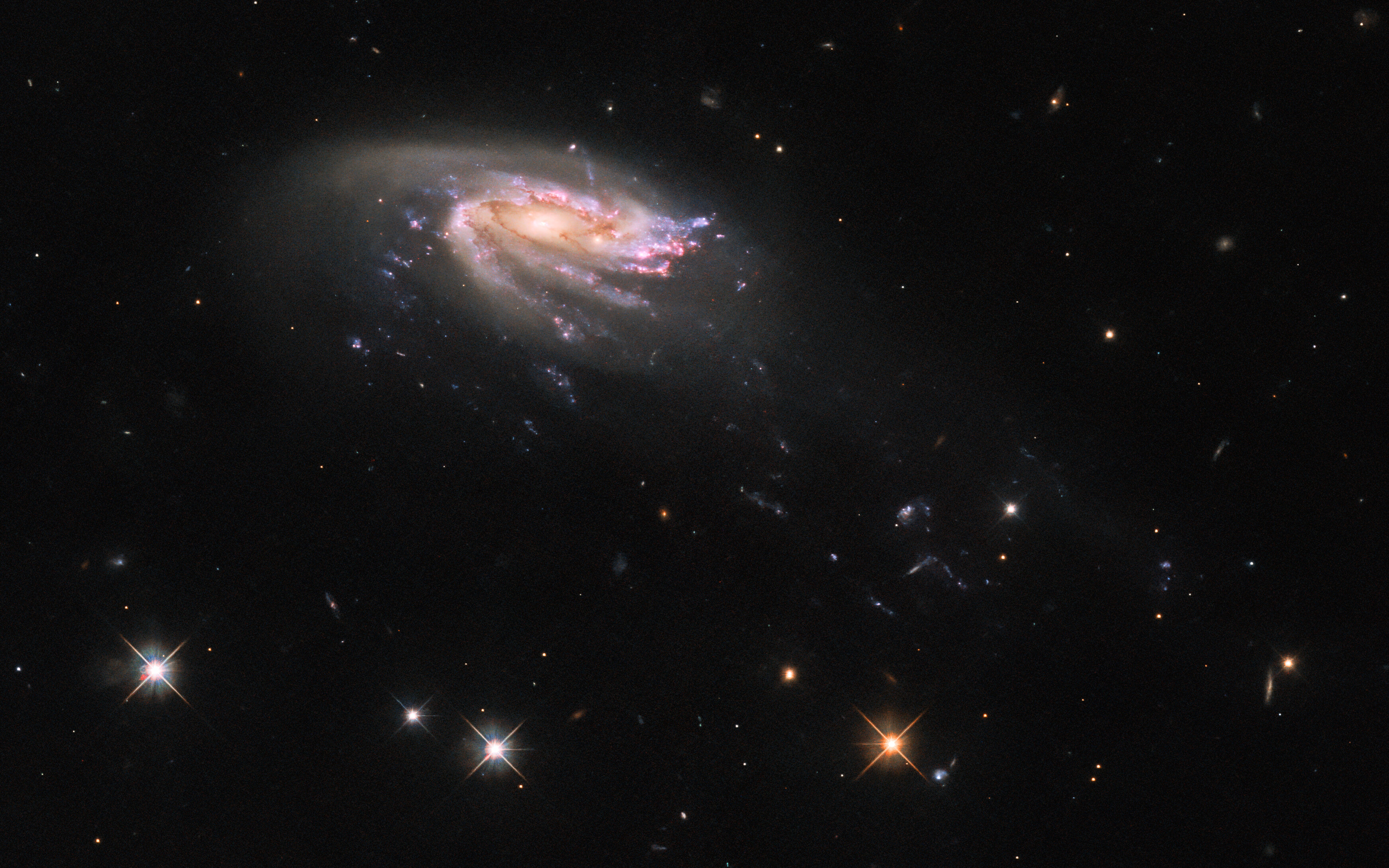
- PGC 1228197, as seen by Hubble Space Telescope

Observation data (J2000 epoch)
- Constellation: Aquarius
- Right ascension: 21h 13m 47.42s
- Declination: +02d 28m 34.90s
- Redshift: 0.050788
- Heliocentric radial velocity: 15,226 km/s
- Distance: 700 Mly (214.62 Mpc)
- Apparent magnitude (V): 0.20
- Apparent magnitude (B): 0.26

Characteristics
- Type: S
- Size: 160,000 ly
- Apparent size (V): 0.45' x 0.23'

Other designations
- LEDA 1228197, 2MASX J21134738+0228347, WINGS J211347.41+022834.9, JO206

PGC 1228197, also known as WINGS J211347.41+022834.9 and JO206, is a large spiral galaxy located 700 million light-years away towards the constellation of Aquarius. The galaxy is estimated to be at least 160,000 light-years in diameter, making it somewhat bigger than the Milky Way. With a radial velocity of 15,226 kilometers per second, it is slowly drifting away.

PGC 1228197 is a member of a poor galaxy cluster called II ZW 108. It has a stellar mass of 8.5 × 10^{10} M_{○}.

PGC 1228197 is classified as a jellyfish galaxy. It has a lengthy tail that is ≥90 kpc wide, with ionized gas stripped from the galaxy. The galaxy is surrounded by its own magnetized intracluster medium drape.

Such process is caused when it interacts with other galaxies causing it to run into intracluster medium. The galaxy then undergoes a process of ram-pressure where its gas is stripped, forming long galactic tendrils of stars. Because matter is accreted into its supermassive black hole, its active galactic nucleus is trigged.

== See also ==
- IC 4141
- PGC 29820
- PGC 65543
- ESO 137-001
