= IC 5337 =

Galaxy in the constellation Pegasus

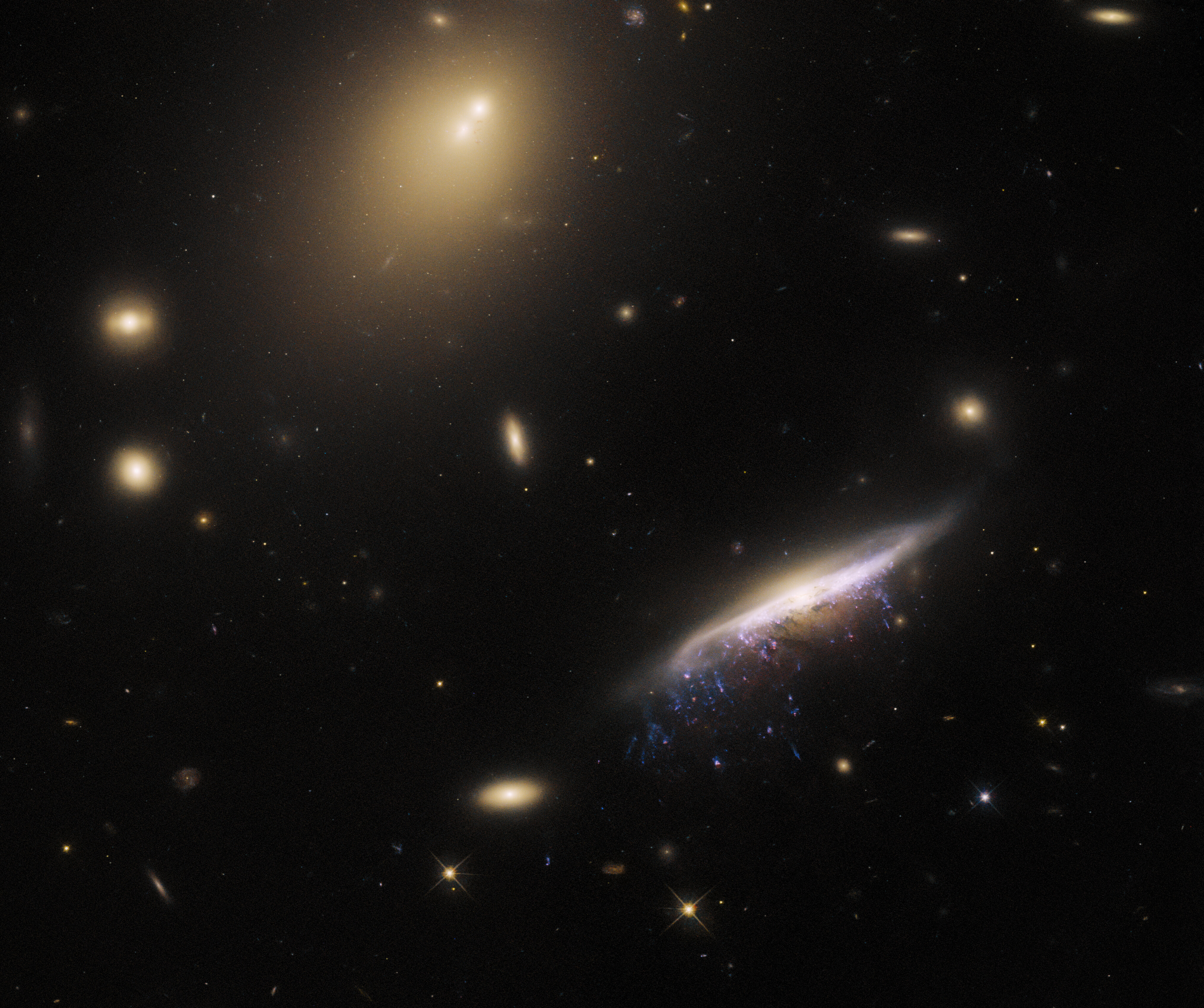
- Hubble Space Telescope image of IC 5337 (lower right) and IC 5338 (upper left)

Observation data (J2000 epoch)
- Constellation: Pegasus
- Right ascension: 23h^{h} 36^{m} 25.03^{s}
- Declination: +21° 09′ 01.98″
- Redshift: 0.054988
- Heliocentric radial velocity: 16,485 km/s
- Distance: 800 Mly (245.2 Mpc)
- Group or cluster: Abell 2626
- Apparent magnitude (V): 0.17
- Apparent magnitude (B): 0.23

Characteristics
- Type: S0, S?
- Size: 175,000 ly (estimated)
- Apparent size (V): 0.8' x 0.1'

Other designations
- PGC 71875, MCG +03-60-012, AGC 330572, 2MASX J23362506+2109028, LEDA 71875, Z455-25, JW100

IC 5337 or JW100, is a spiral galaxy located 800 million light-years away from the Solar System in the constellation of Pegasus.

It was discovered by French astronomer, Stephane Javelle on November 25, 1897 and is probably gravitationally bound to IC 5338, the brightest cluster galaxy in Abell 2626. According to SIMBAD, IC 5337 is considered an emission-line galaxy.

IC 5337 is a jellyfish galaxy, mainly due to ram pressure. Star-forming gas are thrown about, as the galaxy penetrates through the thin gas layer and causing them to drip from the galaxy's disc, giving it its unique appearance of a cosmic jellyfish. It has a stellar mass of 3.2 × 10^{11} M_{☉} and contains an active galactic nucleus likely trigged by accretion of matter into its supermassive black hole.

In addition, IC 5337 also shows an X-ray source.

== See also ==
- IC 4141
- PGC 2456
- Jellyfish galaxy
