= Galaxy harassment =

Galaxies undergoing high speed collisions with other galaxies

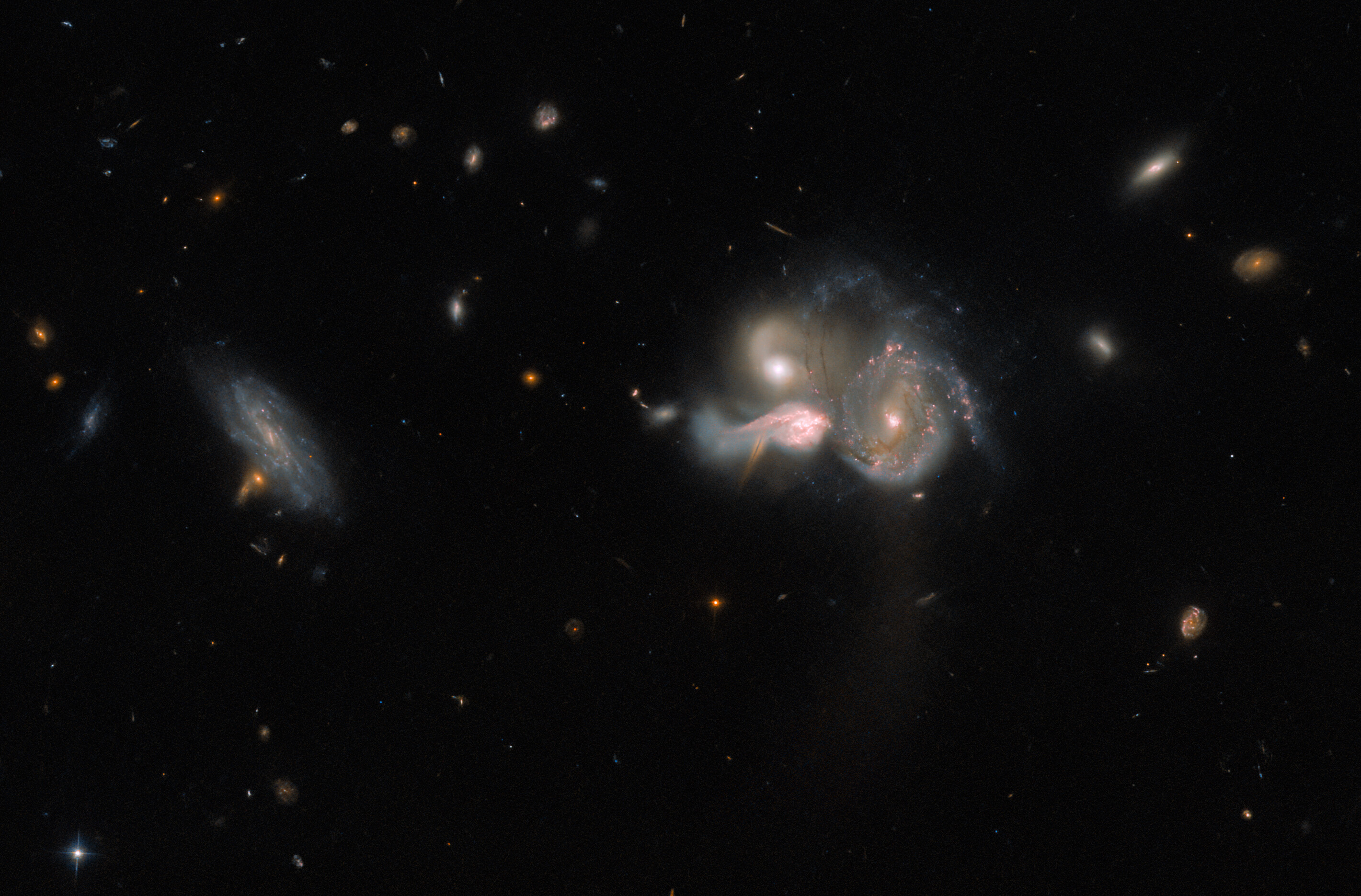
A trio of galaxies known as SDSSCGB 10188. Galaxies that get harassed undergo many collisions with other galaxies.

Galaxy harassment is a form of galaxy interaction in which one or more galaxies interact with each frequently, or are influenced by external gravitational forces of a large galaxy cluster without a direct collision, usually in the form of a flyby. The processes of galaxy harassment can change the morphology of the galaxy, including the triggering of starbursts or morphological changes in the galaxy's structure. Galaxy harassment is different from galactic mergers, where galaxies directly collide and subsequently merge into a singular large galaxy, leaving behind detectable streams of debris. These debris streams could also provide fuel for quasars in host galaxies.

== Effects ==
The mechanisms of galaxy harassment are not significant towards the outskirts of the galaxy cluster due to the smaller number of galaxies that exist. However, towards the center of the cluster, galaxy harassment becomes a significant process altering the morphology of a galaxy. In fact, galaxy harassment drives the morphological evolution of galaxies in clusters. Galaxies towards the outskirts of the galaxy cluster that experience harassment tend to lose only <6% of the total stellar mass while galaxies towards the center of the cluster can lose up to 50% of their total stellar mass. The inclination of a disk galaxy can reduce the mass loss of a galaxy, yet amplify the thickening of the galaxies disk.

An example of the effects of galaxy harassment can be seen when comparing distant galaxy clusters past redshift distance z=0.4 to modern galaxy cluster we can see. Galaxy protoclusters at high distances are filled with small spiral galaxies showing signs of multiple phases of starburst activity but over time, galaxy harassment has transformed many of them into spheroidal galaxies.

=== Globular clusters ===
Galaxy harassment can also affect the globular clusters (GCs) surrounding galaxies. They are strongly affected by the remaining dark matter left after a harassment. Only when dark matter around the galaxy falls to 15% do globular clusters start to get stripped and quickly separate from galaxies. When dark matter falls to just <3%, the galaxy is close to disruption.

== Examples ==
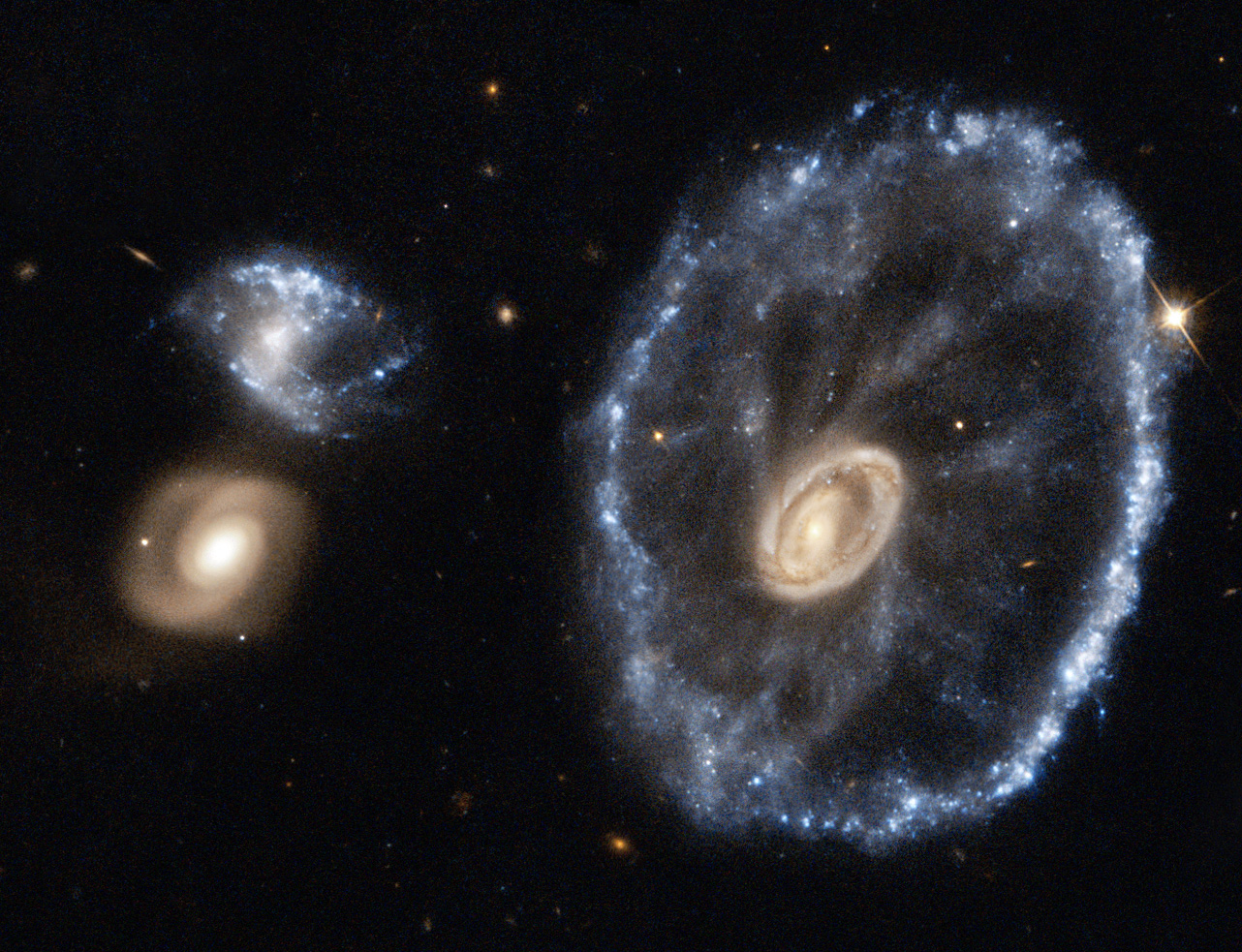
An example of a harassed galaxy, the Cartwheel galaxy.

There are several examples of galaxies that have experienced galaxy harassment. One example is NGC 4254, also known as Messier 99. It is a spiral galaxy located in the Virgo cluster that is believed to have been harassed by another galaxy. This caused the galaxy to experience turbulence and alter the fine scale structure of the galaxies interstellar medium (ISM) suggesting that harassment effects more than just the morphology of the galaxy.

Another example of a galaxy that was harassed is the Cartwheel galaxy, a lenticular galaxy with a noticeable ring around it, making it also a ring galaxy. Its features were formed from a high speed collision with another smaller galaxy transforming it from a Milky Way like galaxy to its current shape.

== See also ==
- Comet Galaxy, a galaxy being stripped by the tidal forces of Abell 2667
- Interacting galaxy
- Ram pressure, gravitational force by larger structures
- Tadpole Galaxy, a galaxy with a visible debris stream
- Tidal stripping, gravitational process where matter is pulled from a galaxy
