= NGC 4500 =

Galaxy in the constellation Ursa Major

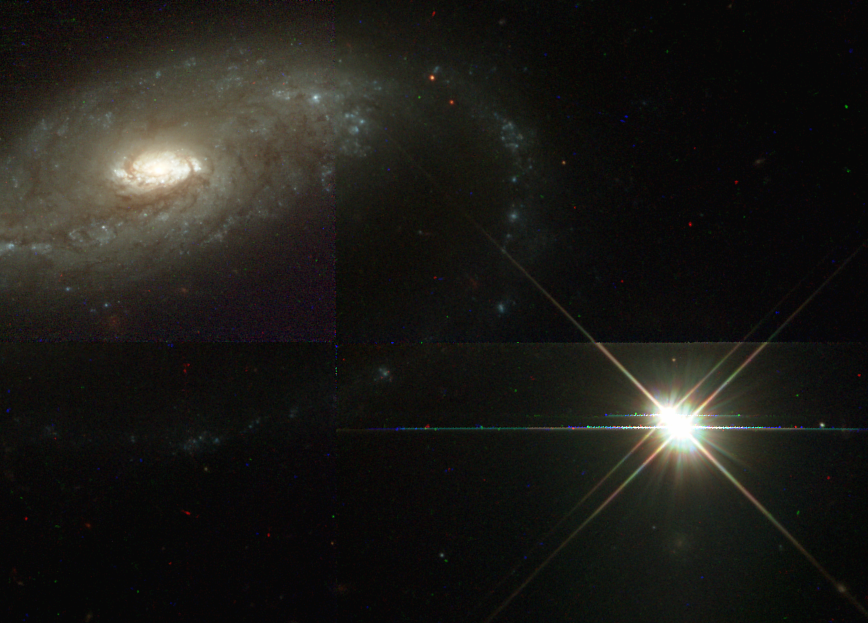
- HST image of NGC 4500 (upper left)

Observation data (J2000 epoch)
- Constellation: Ursa Major
- Right ascension: 12^{h} 31^{m} 22.15431^{s}
- Declination: +57° 57′ 52.6226″
- Redshift: 0.0110
- Heliocentric radial velocity: 3280 km/s
- Distance: 157.5 Mly (48.30 Mpc)
- Apparent magnitude (V): 12.52
- Apparent magnitude (B): 13.12

Characteristics
- Type: SB(s)a

Other designations
- UGC 7667, MCG +10-18-062, Mrk 213, PGC 41436

NGC 4500 is a barred spiral galaxy in the constellation Ursa Major. The galaxy was discovered on April 17, 1789 by William Herschel. It is a blue compact galaxy.

Its distance from Earth is approximately 50 million parsecs.

== See also ==
- List of galaxies
- Comet Galaxy
