= PGC 29820 =

Galaxy located in the constellation Sextans

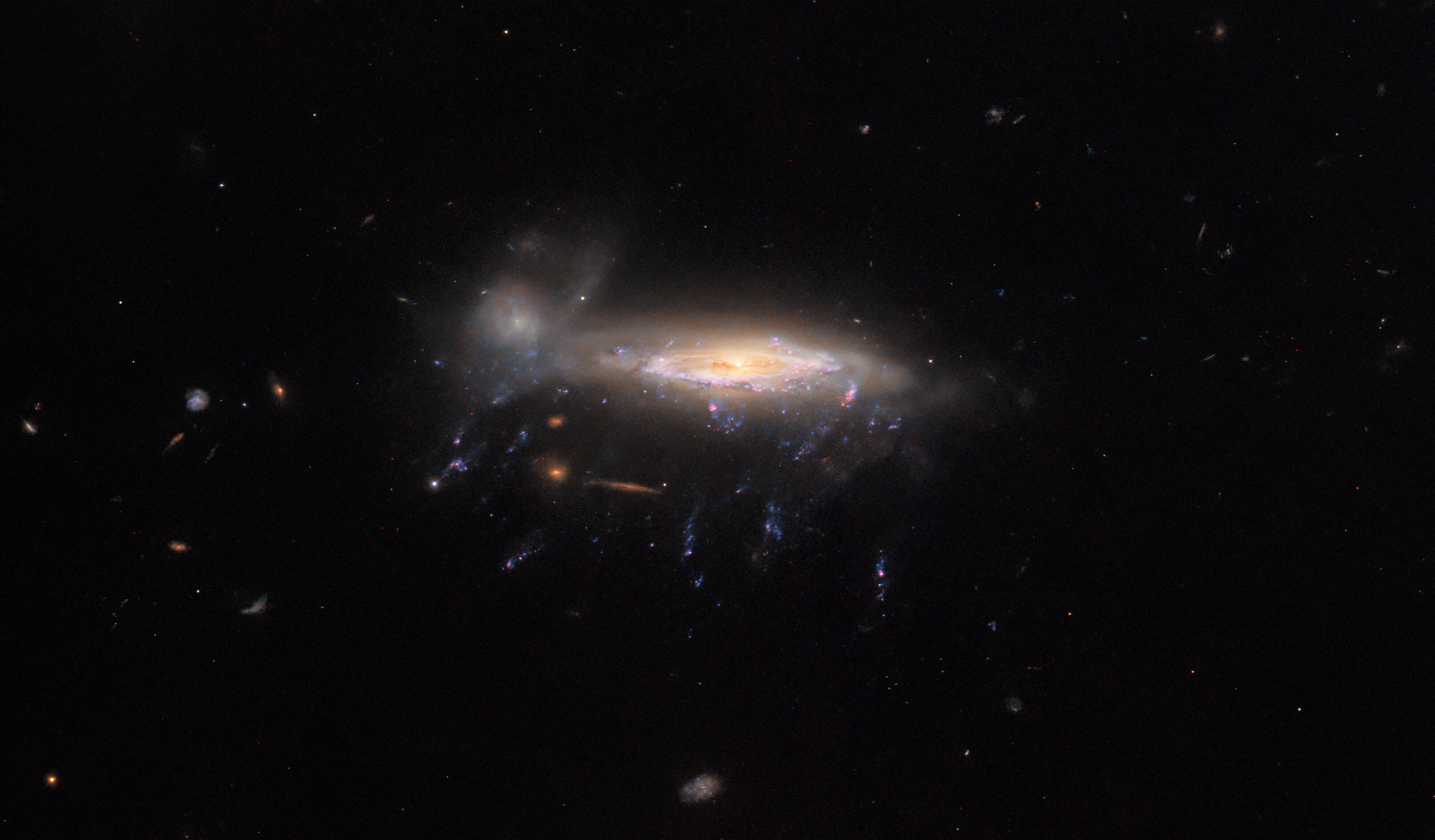
- PGC 29820 imaged by the Hubble Space Telescope

Observation data (J2000 epoch)
- Constellation: Sextans
- Right ascension: 10h 13m 46.82s
- Declination: -00d 54m 51.0s
- Redshift: 0.04244
- Heliocentric radial velocity: 12,723 km/s
- Distance: 600 Mly (183.96 Mpc)
- Group or cluster: Abell 957
- Apparent magnitude (V): 0.11
- Apparent magnitude (B): 0.15

Characteristics
- Type: Sb(f), Seyfert 2
- Size: 120,000 ly

Other designations
- LEDA 29820, CGCG 008-077, 2dFGRS N288Z210, AGC 500048, NVSS J101346-005449, JO204

PGC 29820 (known as JO204) is a spiral galaxy 600 million light-years from the Solar System, in the constellation Sextans. The galaxy is about 120,000 light-years in diameter and is a member of Abell 957, a low-mass galaxy cluster. The first known reference to this galaxy is from volume I of the Catalogue of Galaxies and of Clusters of Galaxies compiled by Fritz Zwicky in 1961, where it was listed as CGCG 008-077.

== Characteristics ==
PGC 29820 is classified a massive galaxy with a stellar mass of M_{*} =4 × 10^{10} M. It contains an active galactic nucleus with double-peaked narrow lines. Moreover, it is also a Seyfert 2 galaxy.

PGC 29820 is classified a jellyfish galaxy. According to Gullieuszik, the galaxy is currently in a first phrase of infalling into the cluster where it is subjected to ram pressure by the intracluster medium.

Because dense gas is compressed, it eventually collapses to form new stars in both the galaxy's tail and its disk. According to researchers, the stars inside the tail, has a star formation rate of 0.22 M_{○} yr^{1} which began during the last 500 million years.

In additional, PGC 29820 shows a large presence of molecular gas making up H_{2} mass of 8.3 billion M_{○}. Looking at ratio of total molecular hydrogen mass and stellar mass, it is estimated as 0.42.

== See also ==
- IC 4141
- PGC 65543
- PGC 1228197
- ESO 137-001
