= Shapley Supercluster =

Supercluster in the constellation Centaurus

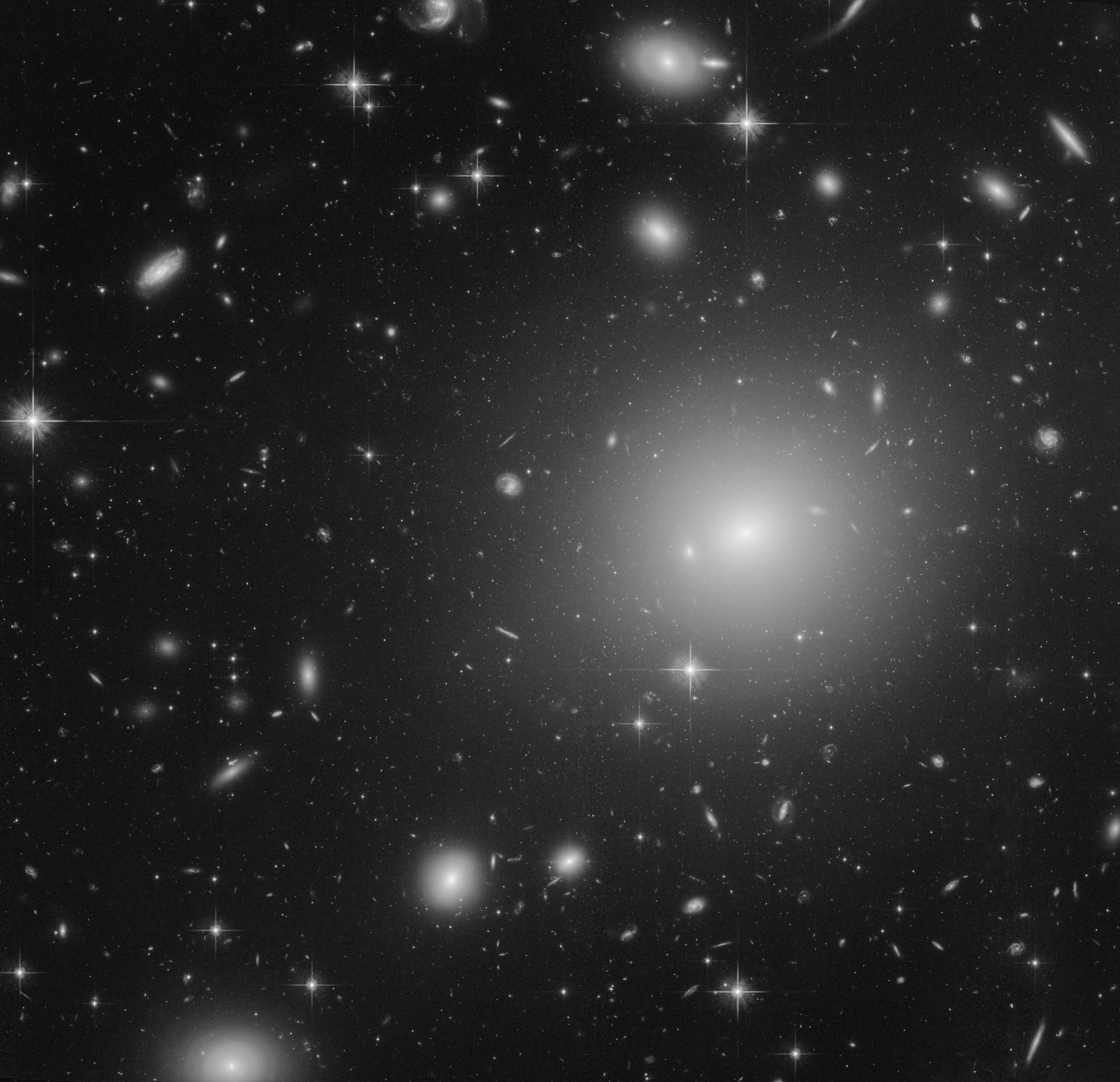
- Galaxies in the Shapley Supercluster

Observation data (Epoch J2000)
- Constellation: Centaurus
- Right ascension: 13^{h} 25^{m}
- Declination: −30° 0′ 0″
- Major axis: 625 Mly (191.5 Mpc) (Note: The calculated volume in Valade et al. (2024) is 7.02×10^{6} Mpc per cube.) (978 Mly (300.0 Mpc)?) (Note: The calculated volume in Dupuy et al. (2021) is 27.0×10^{6} Mpc per cube.)
- Distance: 200 Mpc (652 Mly)

Other designations
- Shapley Supercluster, Shapley Concentration, SCl 124, Shapley BoA, Shapley basin of attraction, Shapley–Centaurus CL, [KK95] 578, Shapley Supercl, [EET94] SCG 80, [ZZS93] 26

The Shapley Supercluster or Shapley Concentration (SCl 124) is one of the largest concentrations of galaxies in the observable universe that forms a bound, gravitationally interacting unit, thereby pulling itself together instead of expanding with the universe. It appears as a striking overdensity in the distribution of galaxies in the constellation of Centaurus. Its center is located roughly 650 million light-years away (z=0.046).

Latest observations suggest Shapley Concentration may contain the Laniakea Supercluster (which in turn contains the Local Group, including the Milky Way) along with a few other nearby superclusters that are moving towards the structure.

== History ==
In 1930, Harlow Shapley and his colleagues at the Harvard College Observatory started a survey of galaxies in the southern sky, using photographic plates obtained at the 24-inch Bruce telescope at Bloemfontein, South Africa. By 1932, Shapley reported the discovery of 76,000 galaxies brighter than 18th apparent magnitude in a third of the southern sky, based on galaxy counts from his plates. Some of this data was later published as part of the Harvard galaxy counts, intended to map galactic obscuration and to find the space density of galaxies.

In this catalog, Shapley could see most of the 'Coma-Virgo cloud' (now known to be a superposition of the Coma Supercluster and the Virgo Supercluster), but found a 'cloud' in the constellation of Centaurus to be the most striking concentration of galaxies. He found it particularly interesting because of its "great linear dimension, the numerous population and distinctly elongated form". This can be identified with what we now know as the core of the Shapley Supercluster. Shapley estimated the distance to this cloud to be 14 times that to the Virgo Cluster, from the average diameters of the galaxies. This would place the Shapley Supercluster at a distance of 231 Mpc, based on the current estimate of the distance to Virgo.

In recent times, the Shapley Supercluster was named by Somak Raychaudhury, from a survey of galaxies from UK Schmidt Telescope Sky survey plates, using the Automated Plate Measuring Facility (APM) at the University of Cambridge in England. In this paper, the supercluster was named after Harlow Shapley, in recognition of his pioneering survey of galaxies in which this concentration of galaxies was first seen. Around the same time, Roberto Scaramella and co-workers had also noticed the Shapley Supercluster in the Abell catalogue of clusters of galaxies: they had named it the Alpha concentration.

== Structure ==
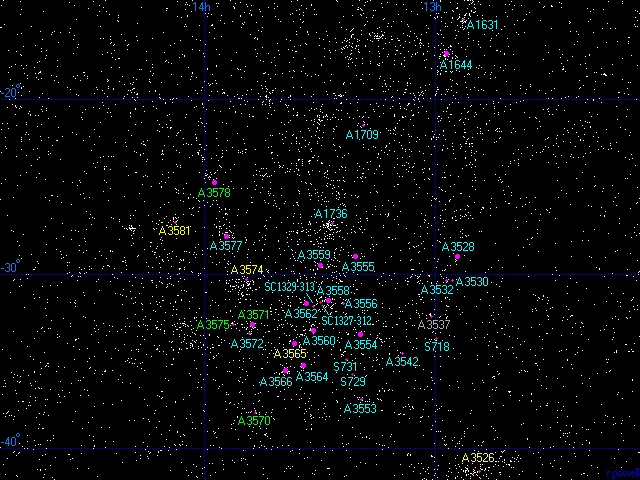
A map of the Shapley Supercluster

The Shapley Supercluster (SCC) is described as a miniature universe that extends over 260 square megaparsecs (Mpc^{2}) and covers a redshift range from 0.033 to 0.06 (with a mean redshift z = 0.048). Its core region, with the right ascension ranging between 198 and 204 degrees and declination ranging between −34 and −29 degrees, includes 11 clusters and groups (A3552, A3554, A3556, A3558, A3559, A3560, A3562, AS0724, AS0726, SC1327-312, and SC1329-313) with masses in the range M_{500} ≈ (1–6)×10^{14} M_{☉}. Among these, A3558 and A3528 are merging X-ray clusters that form two complex structures in the centre and in the outskirts of SSC. The high-density core of the Shapley supercluster is probably the largest among the collapsing cores of superclusters in the local Universe with a mass around 1.3×10^{16} M_{☉} and a radius of 12.4 Mpc. Another research paper states that the Shapley Supercluster consists 28 galaxy clusters.

In another research paper, Shapley Supercluster is detected to have three concentration areas, which the first concentration known as the central concentration, consists of Abell 3556, Abell 3558, Abell 3560, Abell 3564, and Abell 3566. The second concentration is made up of 3 galaxy clusters which are Abell 3528, Abell 3530, and Abell 3532. The Third concentration, or known as “Front Eastern Wall” is composed of Abell 3571, Abell 3572, and Abell 3575.

=== Connection to the Hydra–Centaurus Supercluster by the Front Eastern Wall ===
The Shapley Supercluster is connected to the Hydra–Centaurus Supercluster by the wall of galaxies known as the Front Eastern Wall, that extends to the east and front of the Shapley supercluster at a redshift distance of 10,000-11,000 km/s. This wall of galaxies contains the galaxy clusters Abell 3571, Abell 3572, Abell 3575 and the galaxy group SC1336-314. The galaxy cluster Abell 3570 is located at the southern tip of the wall and Abell 3578 at its northern tip.

== Current interest ==
The Shapley Supercluster lies very close to the direction in which the Local Group of galaxies (including our galaxy) is moving with respect to the cosmic microwave background (CMB) frame of reference. This has led many to speculate that the Shapley Supercluster may be one of the major causes of our galaxy's peculiar motion—the Great Attractor may be another—and has led to a surge of interest in this supercluster. It has been found that the Great Attractor and all the galaxies in our region of the universe (including our galaxy, the Milky Way) are moving toward the Shapley Supercluster.

In 2017 it was proposed that the movement towards attractors like the Shapley Attractor in the supercluster creates a relative movement away from underdense areas, that may be visualized as a virtual repeller. This approach enables new ways of understanding and modelling variations in galactic movements. The nearest large underdense area has been labelled the dipole repeller.

== See also ==
- Dark flow – Controversial hypothesis in astrophysics
- Large-scale structure of the universe – Concept in cosmology
- Norma Cluster – Galaxy cluster in the constellation Norma
