= Shapley Attractor =

Attractor in the Shapley Supercluster

External media

Images
- Graphics showing 3D model of the Shapley Attractor.

Video
- Video showing 3D model of the Shapley Attractor. (YouTube)
- (Vimeo)

The Shapley Attractor is a massive cluster of galaxies located in Shapley Supercluster, most well known for its high density and gravitational pull. Like the Great Attractor, it is obscured by the Milky Way's galactic plane, lying behind the Zone of Avoidance (ZOA), so that in visible light wavelengths, it is difficult to observe directly.

It is opposed to the Dipole Repeller, in the CMB dipole of local galactic flow. It is thought to be the composite contributions of the Shapley Concentration and the Great Attractor.
