= PGC 65543 =

Galaxy located in the constellation Indus

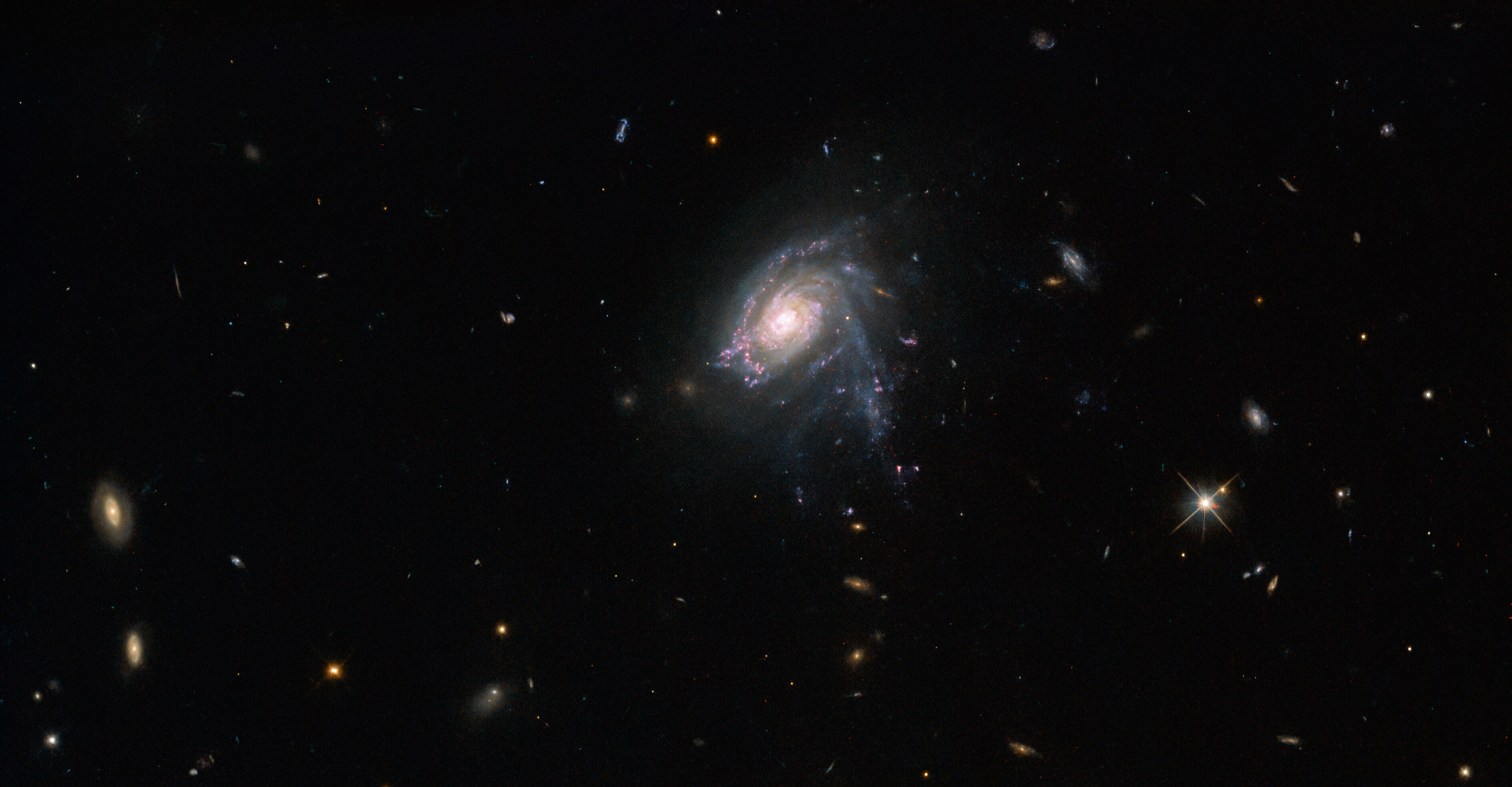
- Hubble Space Telescope image of PGC 65543

Observation data (J2000 epoch)
- Constellation: Indus
- Right ascension: 20h 51m 17.59s
- Declination: -52d 49m 21.50s
- Redshift: 0.047493
- Heliocentric radial velocity: 14,238 km/s
- Distance: 650 Mly (199.2 Mpc)
- Apparent magnitude (V): 0.09
- Apparent magnitude (B): 0.12

Characteristics
- Type: Sa
- Size: 90,000 ly (estimated)
- Apparent size (V): 0.46' x 0.41'

Other designations
- LEDA 65543, 2MASX J20511757-5249221, WINGS J205117.58-524921.5, JO175

PGC 65543 ( known as JO175), is a spiral galaxy, with extensive star forming regions, located in Indus. It is 650 million light-years away from the Solar System and approximately measuring 90,000 light-years in diameter. The tidal interactions from certain galaxies which PGC 65543 is moving towards to, have caused it to get distorted. Its star-forming gas and dust are dynamically stripped by ram-pressure and formed into tendrils that stretch outwards, thus gives an appearance of a jellyfish galaxy.

== See also ==
- PGC 29820
- IC 4141
