= Norma Cluster =

Galaxy cluster in the constellation Norma

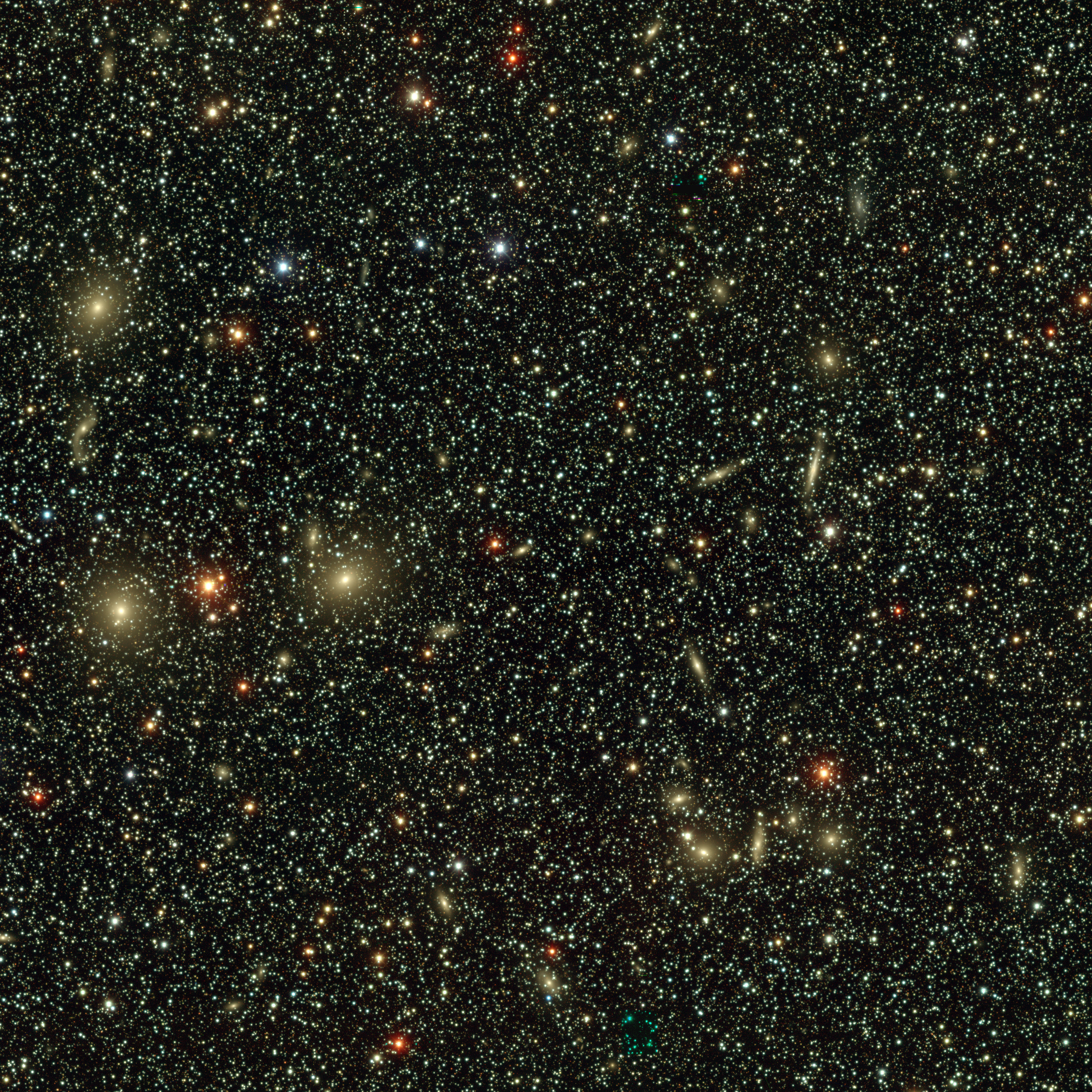
- Centre of Norma Cluster with Milky Way stars in the foreground. Giant galaxies ESO 137-8 and ESO 137-6 are visible to the left.

Observation data (Epoch J2000)
- Constellation(s): Norma, Triangulum Australe
- Right ascension: 16^{h} 14^{m} 22^{s}
- Declination: −60° 52′ 20″
- Parent structure: Norma Wall
- Richness class: 1
- Bautz–Morgan classification: I
- Redshift: 0.005741±0.000010
- Distance: 67.8 Mpc (221.1 Mly) h^{−1}_{0.705}
- Binding mass: 10^{15} M_{☉}
- X-ray flux: 10 mCrab

Other designations
- Abell 3627, ACO 3627

The Norma Cluster (ACO 3627 or Abell 3627) is a rich cluster of galaxies located near the center of the Great Attractor; it is about 68 Mpc (222 Mly) distant. Although it is both nearby and bright, it is difficult to observe because it is located in the Zone of Avoidance, a region near the plane of the Milky Way. Consequently, the cluster is severely obscured by interstellar dust at optical wavelengths. Its mass is estimated to be on the order of 10^{15} solar masses.

ESO 137-001, an example of a jellyfish galaxy, is located in Abell 3627.

== Gallery ==
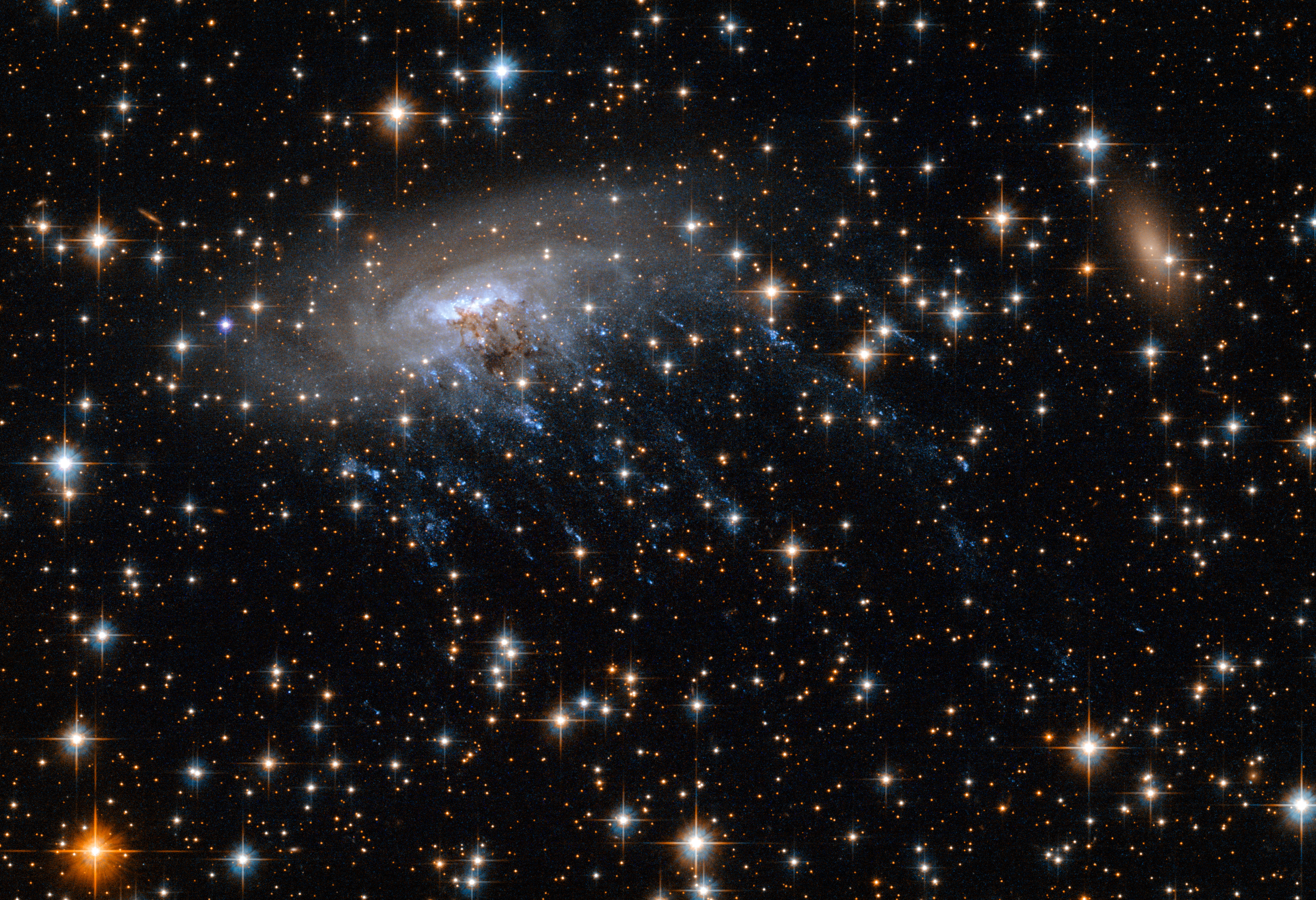
ESO 137-001 located in the Norma cluster

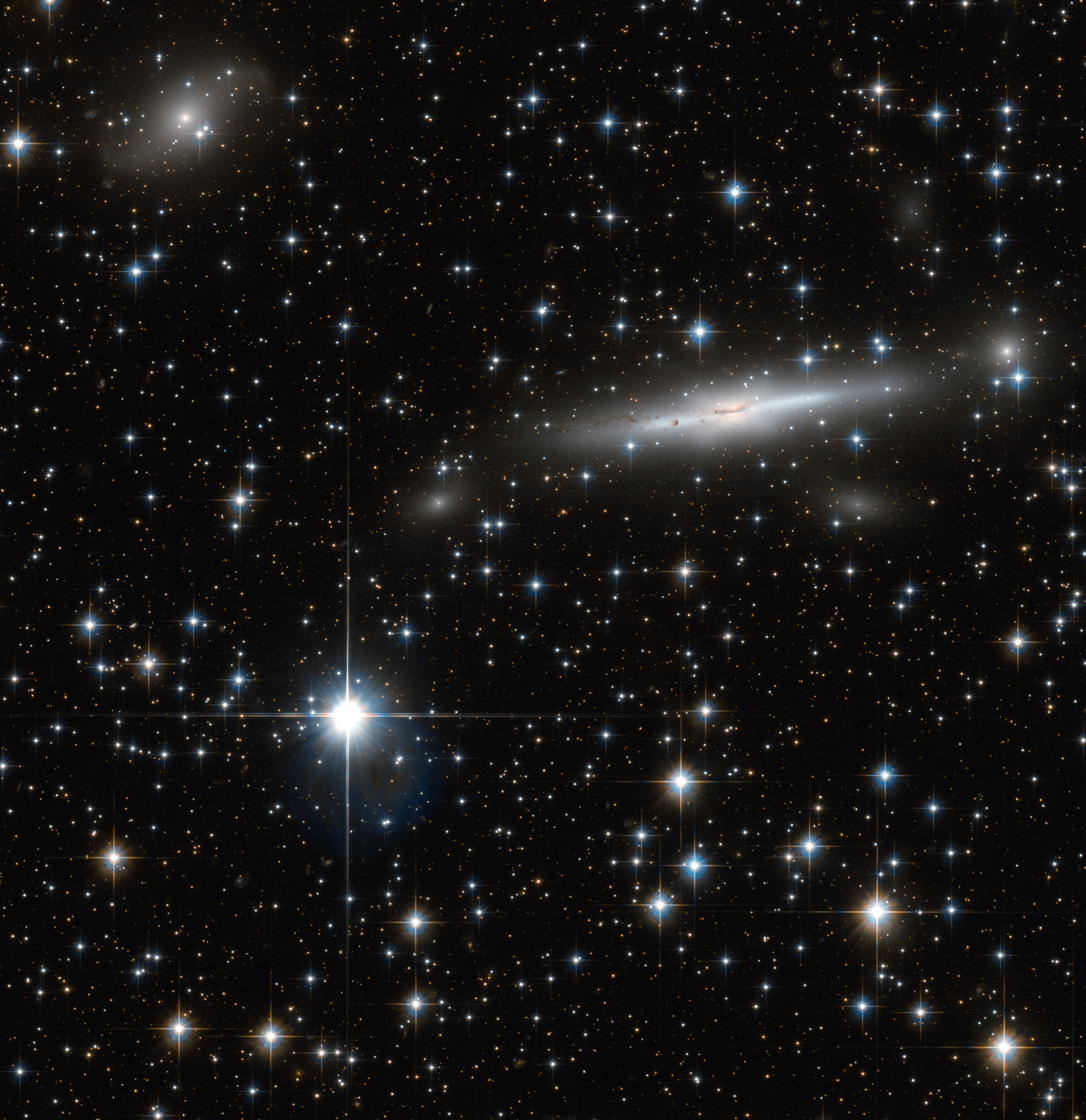
ESO 137-2 located in the Norma cluster

== See also ==
- List of galaxy groups and clusters
- Coma Cluster
- Eridanus Cluster
- Fornax Cluster
- Virgo Cluster
- X-ray astronomy
