= Dipole repeller =

Center of effective repulsion in the large-scale flow of galaxies near the Milky Way

External media

Images
- Graphics showing 3D model of the Dipole repeller.

Video
- Video showing 3D model of the Dipole repeller. (YouTube)
- (Vimeo)

Gravitational attraction induces movement towards more dense areas and at the same time the gravitational repulsion pushes the matter back from an empty zone, according to the 'dipole repeller' model.

The dipole repeller is a center of effective repulsion in the large-scale flow of galaxies in the neighborhood of the Milky Way, first detected in 2017. It is thought to represent a large supervoid, the Dipole Repeller Void.

The dipole repeller is directly opposed to the Shapley Attractor, an over-density of galaxies located in the Shapley Supercluster. The dipole repeller's apparent repulsion is due to matter in the vicinity being pulled towards the Shapley Attractor, along with the Great Attractor. Due to this, the dipole repeller has likely become devoid of matter, causing an apparent repulsion on galaxies between the repeller and the Shapley Attractor.

== Discovery ==
The Local Group of galaxies is moving relative to the cosmic microwave background (CMB) at 631 ± 20 km/s (392 ± 12 mi/s).

There is also a pattern of bulk flow in the motion of neighboring galaxies extending to distances of over 250 Mpc. There is a known overdensity – the Shapley Supercluster – creating an attraction in the flow of galaxies.

The repeller appears to be located at a distance of about 220 Mpc and is anticipated to coincide with a void in galaxy density.

That single center of attraction along with a roughly equal single repeller appear to be the most significant contributors to the CMB dipole.

The authors of the article published in Nature Astronomy in January 2017 argue that the distance velocity measurements of the Dipole Repeller are incompatible with an explanation based solely on an attractive gravitational force. No single observed concentration of matter (gravitationally attractive) can explain the observed velocities and directions of distance from stars and galaxies. Astronomers can therefore observe the presence of an additional force, repulsive and whose nature is not specified, according to these authors.

We show here that repulsion from an underdensity is important and that the dominant influences causing the observed flow are a single attractor — associated with the Shapley concentration — and a single previously unidentified repeller, which contribute roughly equally to the CMB dipole.[...] We conclude that the dipole repeller is not a fictitious structure induced by an ‘edge of the data’ effect, and that subsets of the data, chosen either by distance or galaxy type, uncover a basin of repulsion that ‘pushes’ the Local Group in the direction pointed by the CMB dipole.

One of the authors, Hoffman, told The Guardian:

We show that the Shapley attractor is really pulling, but then almost 180 degrees in the other direction is a region devoid of galaxies, and this region is repelling us. So now we have a pull from one side and a push from the other. It’s a story of love and hate, attraction and repulsion,

Hoffman also told Wired:

In addition to being pulled towards the known Shapley Concentration, we are also being pushed away from the newly discovered Dipole Repeller. Thus it has become apparent that push and pull are of comparable importance at our location.

Hoffman told IFLScience:

After subtracting out the mean expansion of the universe, the net gravitational force of the overdense regions is that of an attraction and that of the under-dense regions is that of repulsion.

The CNRS shared the same position and stated in a press release:

Over the years, the debate has bogged down on the relative importance of these two attractors, as they are not enough to explain our movement, especially since it does not point exactly in the direction of Shapley as it should.[...] The team thus discovered that at the location of our galaxy the repulsive and attractive forces from distant entities are of comparable importance and deduced that the major influences that are at the origin of our movement are the Shapley attractor and a vast region of void (i. e. without visible and invisible matter), previously unidentified, that they named the Dipole Repeller.

The same research team identified in September 2017 a second void with repulsive force: the Cold Spot Repeller.

These voids, which repel by the inverse gravitational force, are among main components of the cosmic "V-Web".

== Controversy about the Dipole Repeller and its 'repulsive force' ==
Nevertheless, the discovery of the Dipole Repeller was commented on by astrophysicists and journalists in the mainstream media without using repulsive force. This is the case of Peter Coles, author of the blog "In the dark", Ethan Siegel in an article published by Forbes, as well as in an article published by Ars Technica.

This is because gravitation is an attractive force, but if there is an underdense region it apparently acts as a gravitational repeller, based on the concept that there may be less attraction in the direction of the underdensity, and the greater attraction due to the higher density in other directions acts to pull objects away from the underdensity; in other words, the apparent repulsion is not an active force, but due simply to the lack of a force counteracting the attraction.

== See also ==
- Cosmic microwave background – Trace radiation from the early universe
- Shapley Supercluster – Supercluster in the constellation Centaurus
- Great Attractor – Region of overdensity of galaxies
- Shapley Attractor – Attractor in the Shapley Supercluster
- Local Void – Vast void adjacent to the Local Group
