= ESO 137-001 =

Galaxy in the constellation Triangulum Australe

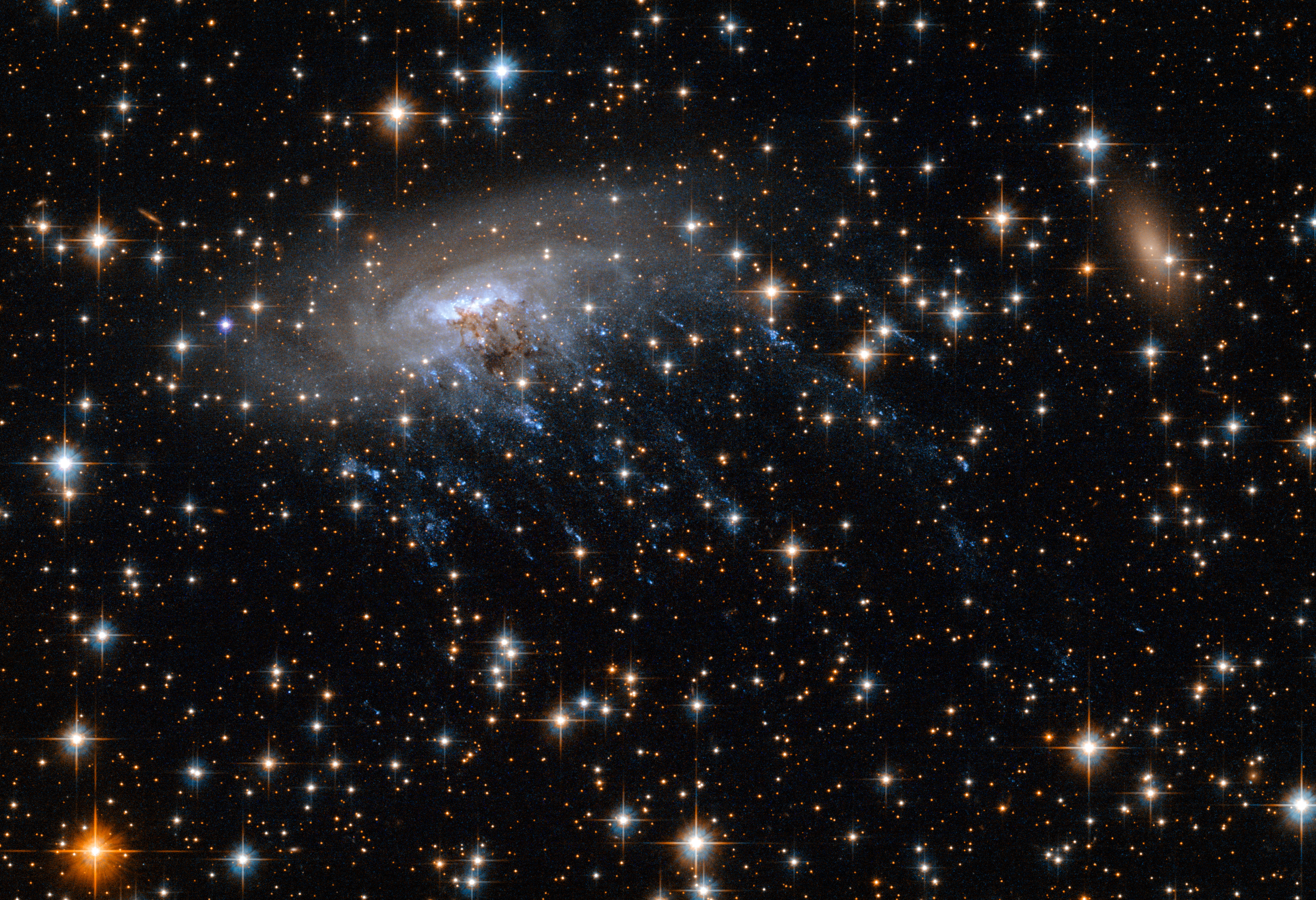
- HST image of ESO 137-001

Observation data (J2000 epoch)
- Constellation: Triangulum Australe
- Right ascension: 16^{h} 13^{m} 27.305^{s}
- Declination: −60° 45′ 50.59″
- Redshift: 0.015565
- Heliocentric radial velocity: 4630 ± 58 km/s
- Distance: 220 million ly

Characteristics
- Type: SBc
- Size: 100,000 ly
- Apparent size (V): 1.23′ × 0.55′
- Notable features: Trail of gas

Other designations
- ESO 137-001, ESO 137-1, ESO-LV 137-0010, PGC 57532

ESO 137-001, also known as the Jellyfish Galaxy, is a barred spiral galaxy located in the constellation Triangulum Australe and in the cluster Abell 3627. As the galaxy moves to the center of the galaxy cluster at 1900 km/s, it is stripped by hot gas, thus creating a 260,000 light-year long tail. This is called ram pressure stripping (RPS). The intergalactic gas in Abell 3627 is at 100 million Kelvin, which causes star formation in the tails. The galaxy has a low amount of Hl regions which combine to a total mass of 3.5x10^8 solar masses, only 10% of which is located in the main disk of ESO 137-001.

== History ==
The galaxy was discovered by Ming Sun in 2005.

== Galaxy's fate ==
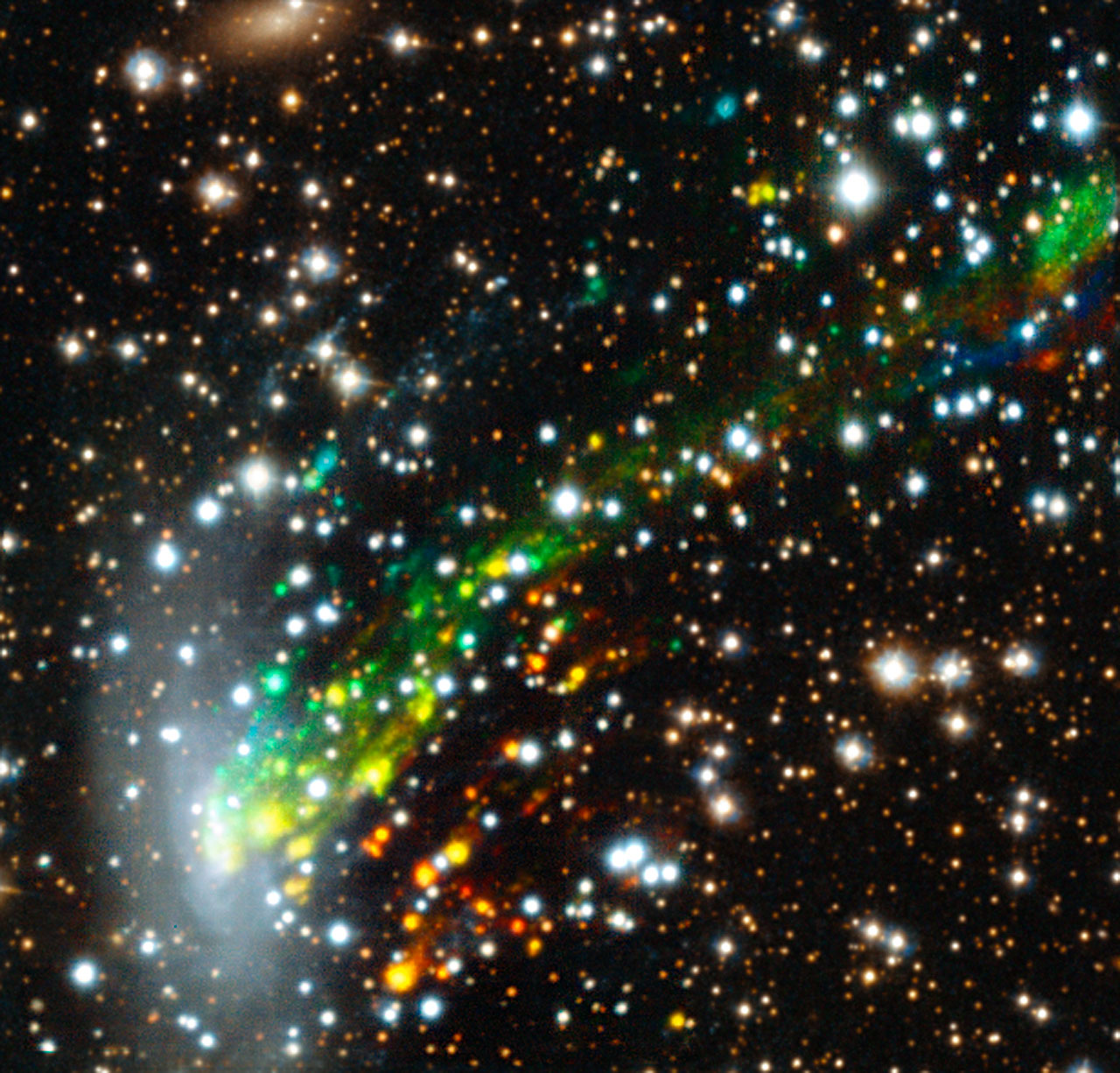
Observations reveal motion of gas as it is ripped out of the galaxy.

The stripping of gas is thought to have a significant effect on the galaxy's development, removing cold gas from the galaxy, shutting down the formation of new stars in the galaxy, and changing the appearance of inner spiral arms and bulges because of the effects of star formation.

== Gallery ==
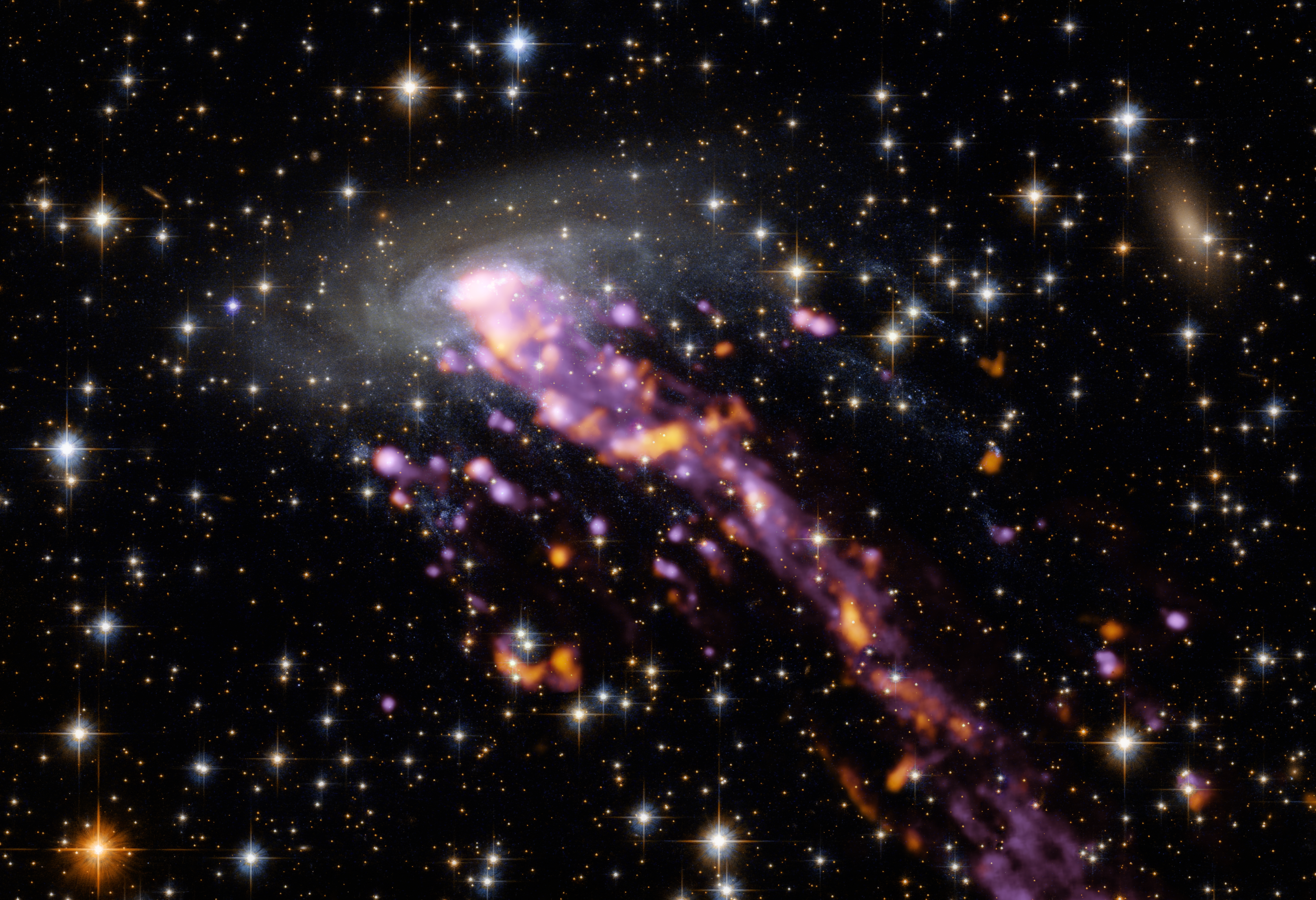
ALMA explores a Cosmic Jellyfish.

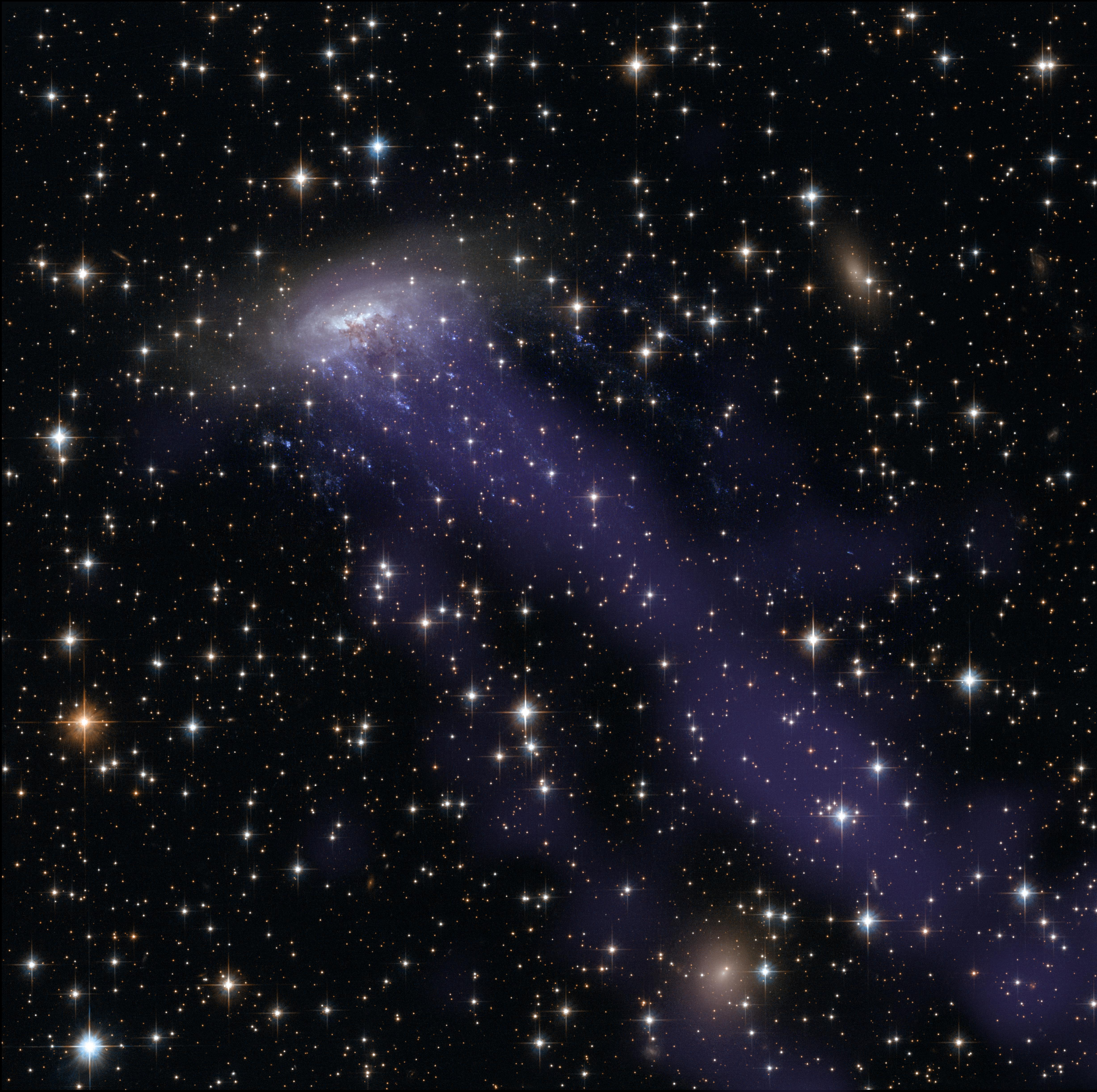
Runaway Galaxy (12952512944)

== See also ==
- Abell 3627
- List of galaxies
- Jellyfish galaxy
