= Jellyfish galaxy =

Type of galaxy that is being stripped of gas due to ram pressure stripping

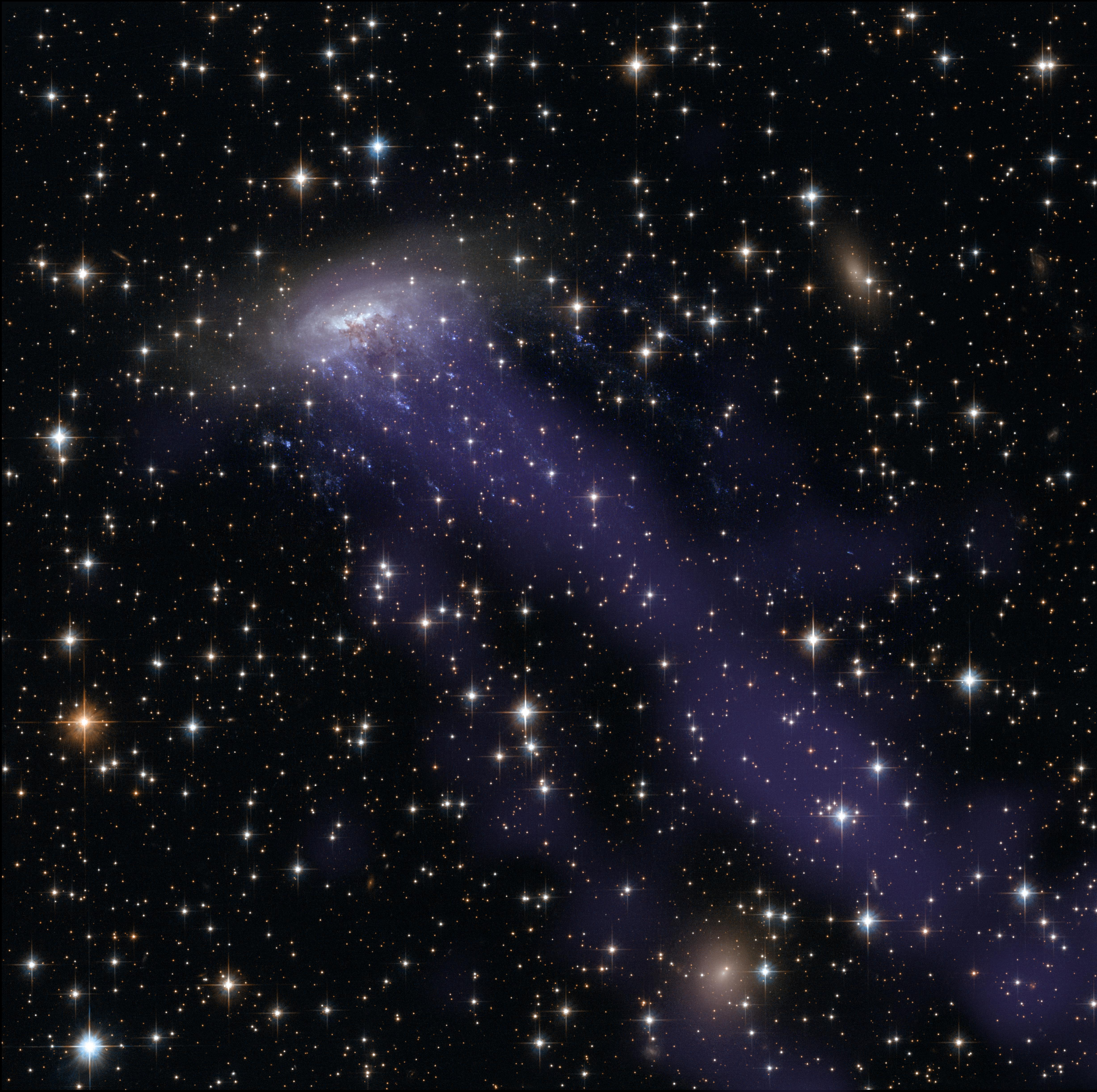
Ram pressure stripping of gas from a galaxy in ESO 137-001.

A jellyfish galaxy is a type of galaxy found in galaxy clusters. They take the appearance of jellyfish with a distinctive tail of gas often with regions of starbursts along it. They are formed when a galaxy located in a galaxy cluster with a dense environment travels through it. The gas in the galaxy is stripped off in a process called ram pressure stripping.

The most distant jellyfish galaxy is currently the candidate galaxy COSMOS2020-635829.

== Formation ==
Clusters of galaxies are known to influence and transform galaxies through interactions with the intracluster medium (ICM). Observed effects include galaxy collisions, galaxy harassment and jellyfish galaxies. Jellyfish galaxies are seen as extreme examples of how a galaxy can change due to the effects of a dense environment inside galaxy clusters.

Jellyfish galaxies form through a process known as ram-pressure stripping (RPS). The pressure exerted on a galaxy is directly proportional to the density of the local gas in the ICM and to the square of the galaxy's velocity with respect to the ICM. The resulting gas being removed from the galaxy's interstellar medium (ISM) occurs in the direction of the galaxy's movement, trailing behind it a distinctive gaseous trail of star-forming regions. This trail and deformation of the galaxies disk gives it the appearance of a jellyfish, hence the name for this type of galaxies. There have been numerous studies that use extensive numerical simulations that predict that gradual stripping should be visible even in galaxy clusters with low-mass. It seems that star formation in these gas tails can only occur when the galaxy is traveling at supersonic motions.

== Characteristics ==
Observational studies of jellyfish galaxies have discovered that these types of galaxies are more likely to host active galactic nuclei (AGN) than other galaxies of similar mass located towards the clusters center. This suggests that there is a link between the effects of ram pressure on a galaxy and the growth of a supermassive black hole (SMBH). This can be caused by the compression of gas in these galaxies which leads to intense episodes of AGN feedback and star formation.

== Examples ==
Jellyfish galaxies have been seen in a number of galaxy clusters including the Hydra Cluster, Abell 2125 (redshift z=0.20; ACO 2125 C153); Abell 2667 (z=0.23; G234144−260358); Abell 2744 (z=0.31; ACO 2744 Central Jellyfish; HLS001427–30234/ACO 2744 F0083; GLX001426–30241 / ACO 2744 F0237 / ACO 2733 CN104; MIP001417–302303 / ACO 2744 F1228; HLS001428–302334; GLX001354–302212 ).

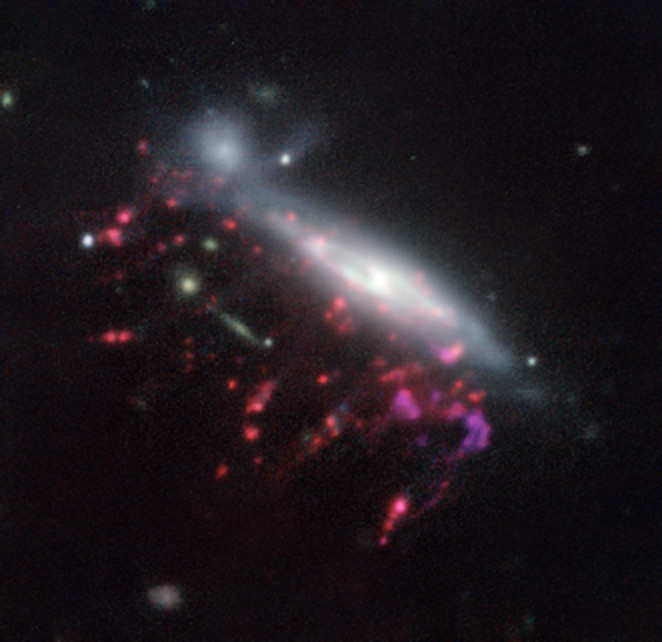
Jellyfish galaxy JO204 taken by ESO's MUSE instrument.

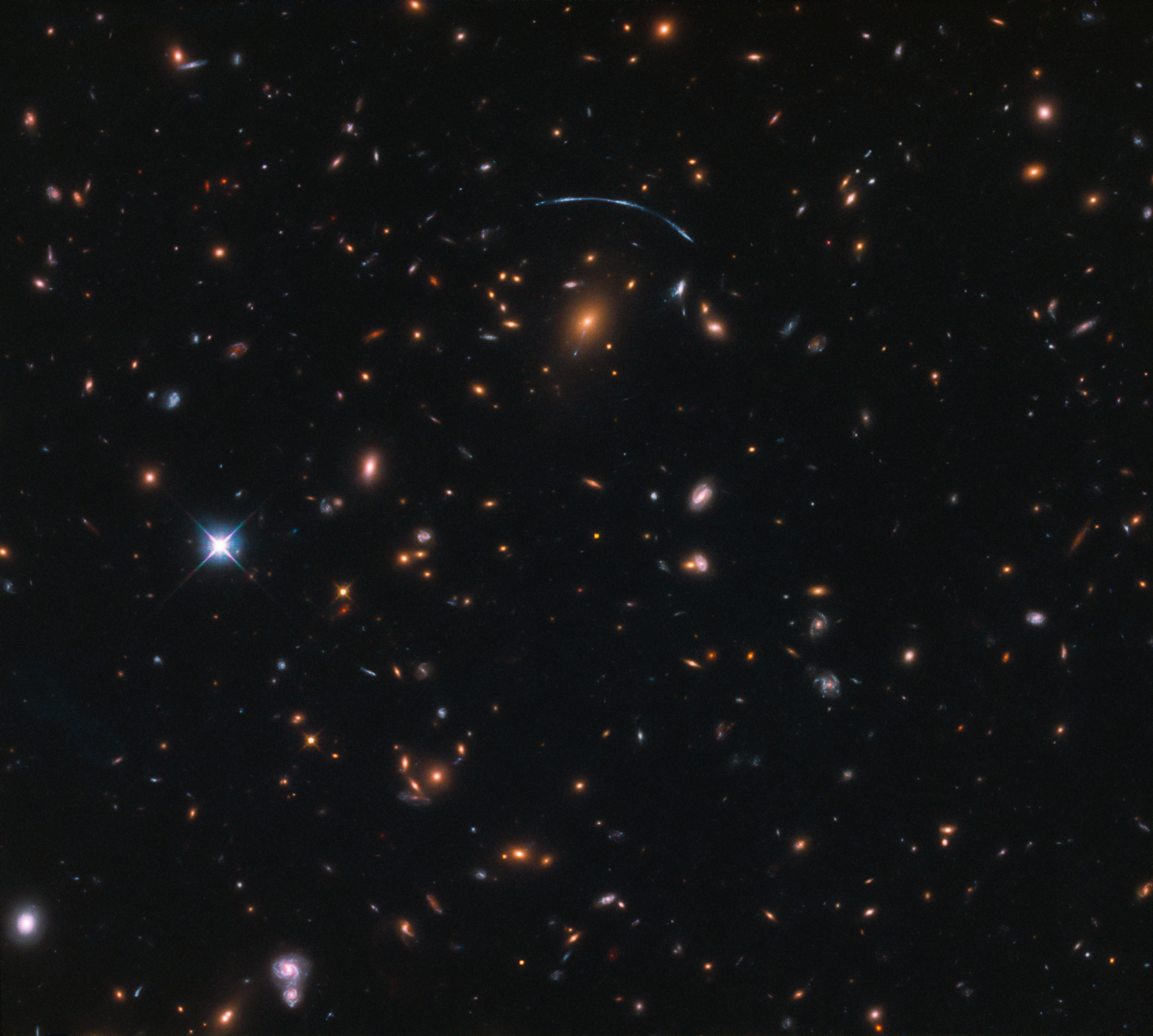
Jellyfish galaxy in SDSS J1110+6459, visible next to the cluster and apparently dripping bright blue material.

NASA/ESA Hubble image of galaxy JW100 with streams of star-forming gas dripping from the disc of the galaxy like streaks of fresh paint. These tendrils of bright gas are formed by ram pressure stripping, and their resemblance to dangling tentacles led astronomers to refer it as a ‘jellyfish’ galaxy.
