= Comet Galaxy =

Galaxy in the constellation Sculptor

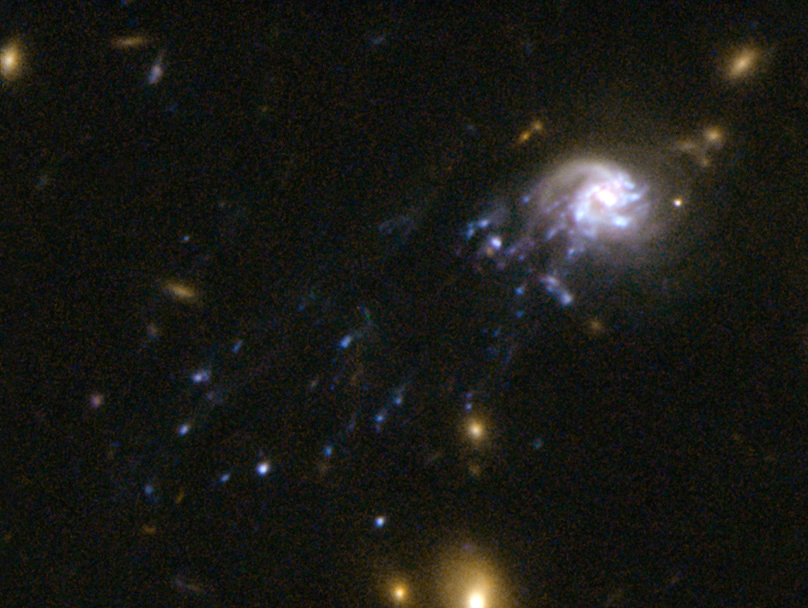
- The Comet Galaxy, as taken by the Hubble Space Telescope

Observation data (J2000 epoch)
- Constellation: Sculptor
- Right ascension: 23^{h} 51^{m} 44.03^{s}
- Declination: −26° 03′ 59.6″
- Redshift: 0.2265
- Heliocentric radial velocity: 67,753±89 km/s
- Galactocentric velocity: 67,778±89 km/s
- Distance: 3,250 ± 227.7 Mly (996.6 ± 69.8 Mpc)h^{−1}_{0.6774} (Comoving); 2.777 Gly (0.8514 Gpc)h^{−1}_{0.6774} (Light-travel)
- Group or cluster: Abell 2667
- Apparent magnitude (B): 18.642

Characteristics
- Type: dIrr
- Mass: 3.8×10^{8} (stellar) M_{☉}
- Size: 170,000 ly × 142,000 ly (52.2 kpc × 43.5 kpc) (Note: Calculated based on minor and major angular diameters and the quoted comoving distance: $$996.6 Mpc * sin(0.18 arcmin) = 52.2 kpc$$ $$996.6 Mpc * sin(0.15 arcmin) = 43.5 kpc$$)
- Apparent size (V): 0.18′ × 0.15′
- Notable features: Stripped stream of bright blue knots and diffuse wisps of young stars

Other designations
- 2dFGRS TGS132Z144, EQ J235144-260358, WISEA J235144.05-260357.9, LEDA 3234374,

The Comet Galaxy (EQ J235144-260358) is a peculiar spiral galaxy located in the galaxy cluster Abell 2667 of the Sculptor constellation. Lying 996.6 megaparsecs (3.3 billion light-years) away from Earth, it has a solar mass of 3.8×10^{8} M_{☉}, greater than the mass of the Milky Way. It was first detected by astronomers on 2 March 2007 with the Hubble Space Telescope, and was nicknamed after its resemblance to a comet with a long tail.

The galaxy is currently traveling through the galactic cluster at 3.6 million km/h (2.17 million mi/h), and thus is being tidally stripped of much of its matter as a result of the cluster's ram pressure.

== Structure ==
The Comet Galaxy is a peculiar galaxy that features an extended stream of interstellar gas, blue knots (or large clumps of matter), and wisps of bright-blue young stars. It is currently traveling through Abell 2667 at 3.6 million km/h (1,000 km/s), and as a result of the gravitational forces of the cluster, much of the galaxy's matter is being stripped out into a long tail, similar to a comet; as a result, one of the galaxy's arms appears flatter then the surrounding arms, while the tail contains numerous bright starburst regions.

Its isophotal diameter is currently unknown. Based off its apparent size of 10.8 arcseconds for the main galaxy, along with the galaxy's distance from Earth, it approximately corresponds to a diameter of 52.2 kiloparsecs (170,000 light-years), thus making it slightly larger than the Andromeda Galaxy.

== Fate ==
Abell 2667, the galaxy cluster in which the Comet Galaxy is flying through

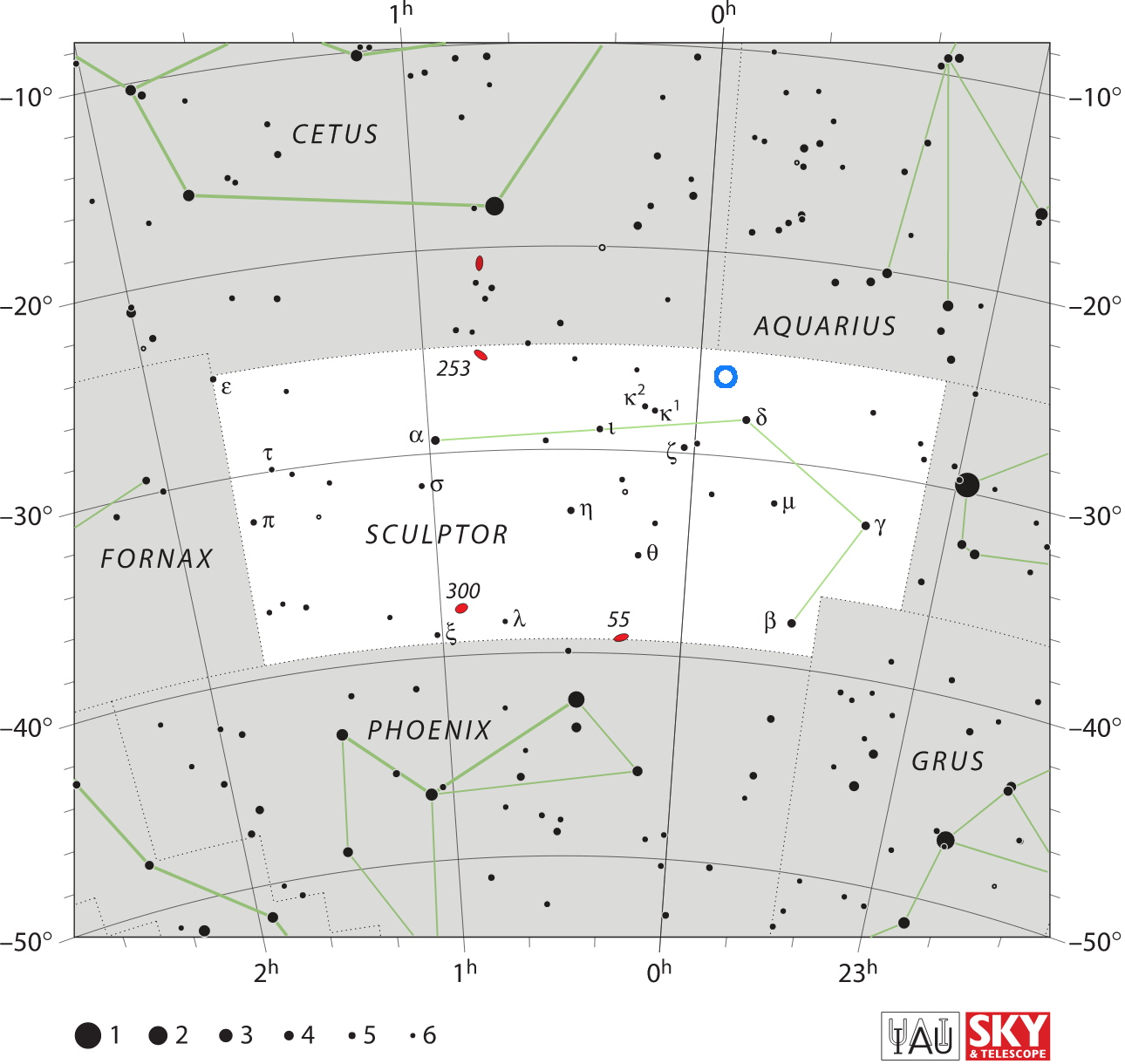
The location of the Comet Galaxy (circled in blue)

The Сomet Galaxy is currently being tidally stripped as a result of the extreme ram pressures exerted by Abell 2667. As the galaxy travels through at 3.6 million km/h (2.17 million mi/h), its gas and stars are stripped away by the tidal forces and charged particles exerted by the cluster. Also contributing to this destructive process is the pressure of the cluster's hot intergalactic gas and plasma, reaching temperatures as high as 100 million degrees. Scientists estimate that the total duration of the transformation process is close to one billion years; the galaxy is seen to be roughly 400 million years into this process. In spite of the galaxy's large mass, the spiral will lose majority of its gas and dust, resulting in a gas-poor lenticular or elliptical galaxy with an older population of red dwarf stars. The finding sheds light on the process by which some gas-rich galaxies might evolve into gas-poor galaxies over billions of years. Observations also reveal one mechanism that may result in intergalactic stars.

== See also ==
- Interacting Galaxy
- Antennae Galaxies (NGC 4038/4039), pair of interacting galaxies
- Condor Galaxy (NGC 6872), spiral galaxy with extremely long spiral arms
- Mice Galaxies (NGC 4676), pair of interacting galaxies with large trails
- Rubin's Galaxy (UGC 2885), giant spiral galaxy
