= Great Attractor =

Region of gravitational attraction in the local universe

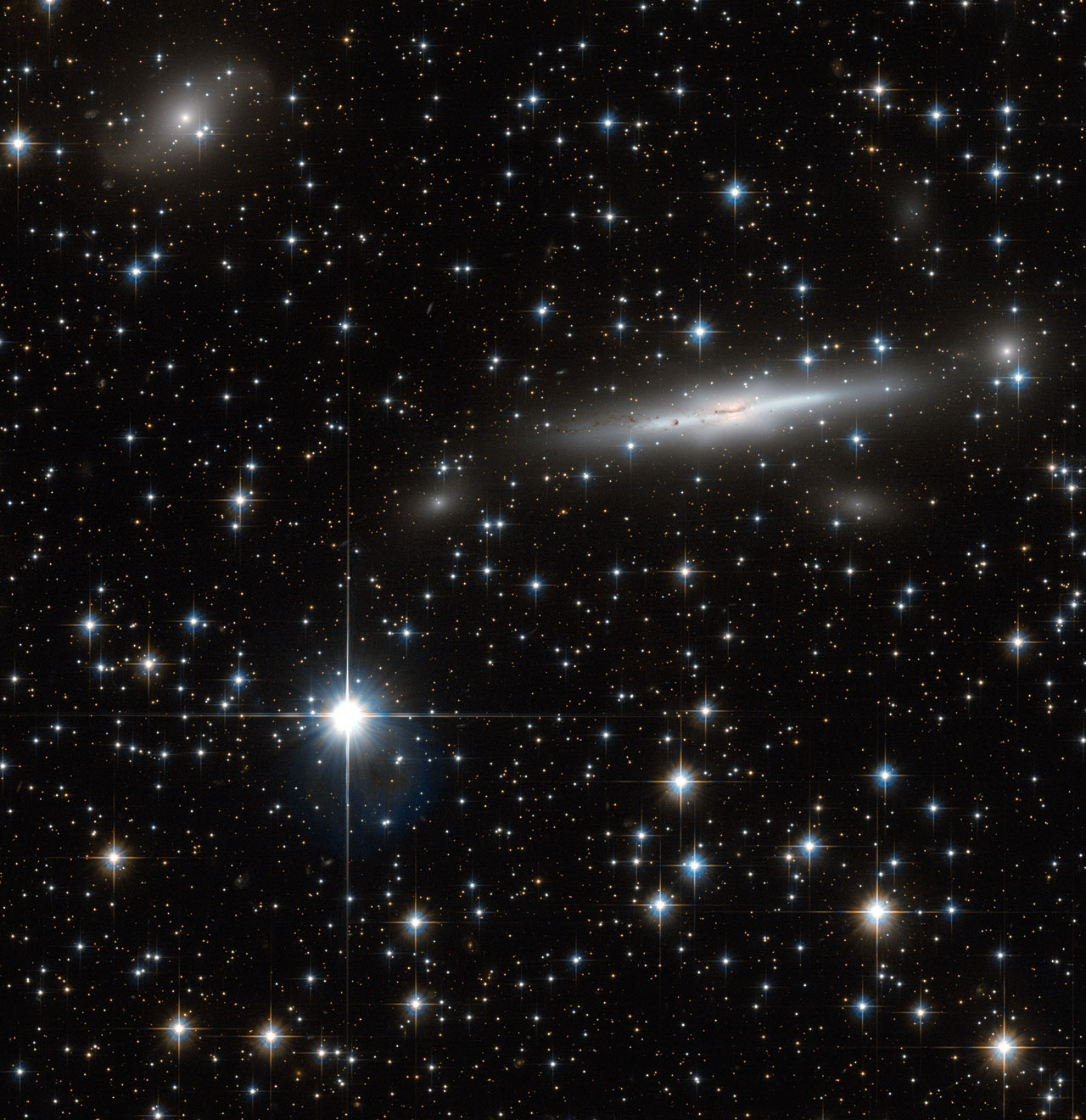
Hubble Space Telescope image showing part of the Norma Cluster, including the galaxy ESO 137-002

The Great Attractor is a region of enhanced gravitational attraction in the local universe. It lies in the general direction of the Norma Cluster and the Hydra–Centaurus Supercluster, approximately 150–250 million light-years from the Milky Way. Its presence was inferred from the peculiar motions of galaxies, which deviate from the motion expected solely from the expansion of the universe.

The term does not refer to a single galaxy, galaxy cluster, or compact astronomical object. Instead, it describes a broad concentration of matter and an associated minimum in the local gravitational-potential and velocity fields. Early models attributed a mass of approximately 10^{16} solar masses (M_{☉}) to the region. Later observations indicated that the motion of nearby galaxies cannot be explained by the Great Attractor region alone and that more distant structures, particularly the Shapley Supercluster, also contribute substantially.

The region is difficult to observe at visible wavelengths because it lies behind the galactic plane of the Milky Way, within the Zone of Avoidance. Dust, gas, and foreground stars obscure many background galaxies in this part of the sky. Astronomers therefore study the area using X-ray, radio, infrared, and neutral-hydrogen observations, which penetrate the obscuring material more effectively than visible light.

The Great Attractor was incorporated into the definition of the Laniakea Supercluster in 2014. Under that definition, Laniakea is a basin of attraction whose galaxy flows converge approximately toward the Norma and Centaurus regions. More recent reconstructions using the larger Cosmicflows-4 catalogue have suggested that Laniakea may not be an independent basin and may instead form part of a substantially larger basin associated with the Shapley concentration.

== Observational basis ==
On sufficiently large scales, galaxies recede from one another in accordance with the Hubble–Lemaître law. Their observed recession velocities, however, also contain local departures from uniform cosmic expansion. These departures are known as peculiar velocities and result mainly from gravitational interactions with nearby concentrations and deficits of matter.

Astronomers estimate a galaxy's peculiar velocity by comparing its independently measured distance with the recession velocity inferred from its redshift. If a galaxy is moving faster or more slowly than expected from the Hubble flow, the difference provides information about the distribution of matter around it.

Galaxies across a region hundreds of millions of light-years wide display coherent peculiar motions in the direction of the Great Attractor. Measured values vary with position and can range from approximately +700 km/s to −700 km/s relative to a model of uniform cosmic expansion. These motions reveal a broad velocity field rather than infall toward a single point.

The motion of the Local Group is also influenced by regions of low density. In 2017, researchers identified a large underdense region called the Dipole Repeller, from which local galaxy flows appear to diverge. The combined gravitational influence of overdense structures in one direction and underdense regions in another contributes to the observed motion of the Milky Way and nearby galaxies.

The Great Attractor region itself participates in a larger-scale flow toward the Shapley concentration. It is therefore not a fixed final destination for the Local Group, but one component of a complex network of filaments, clusters, voids, and gravitational basins.

== History ==
=== Early evidence of large-scale motion ===
Evidence that nearby galaxies were not following a perfectly uniform Hubble flow, such as the Rubin–Ford effect, emerged during the 1970s. Measurements of the cosmic microwave background also revealed a dipole anisotropy, indicating that the Local Group was moving relative to the large-scale cosmic rest frame.

During the 1970s and early 1980s, astronomers developed increasingly accurate methods of estimating galaxy distances independently of redshift. These included the Tully–Fisher relation for spiral galaxies and scaling relations for elliptical galaxies. Such measurements made it possible to distinguish motion caused by cosmic expansion from motion caused by local gravitational fields.

=== Discovery ===
The Great Attractor was identified during the 1980s by a collaboration informally known as the Seven Samurai: David Burstein, Roger Davies, Alan Dressler, Sandra Faber, Donald Lynden-Bell, Roberto Terlevich, and Gary Wegner.

The group studied approximately 400 elliptical galaxies using the Dn–sigma relation, which links the physical size of an elliptical galaxy with the motions of its stars. By comparing distance estimates with observed redshifts, the researchers constructed maps of the galaxies' peculiar velocities.

The resulting pattern showed a coherent stream of galaxies toward a previously unrecognized concentration of mass. Lynden-Bell and his collaborators described this concentration as a new supergalactic center. Dressler coined the name "Great Attractor", which became widely used.

The initial findings raised questions about whether then-current cosmological models could readily produce coherent motions on such large scales. Later surveys, improved distance measurements, and more complete maps of the surrounding universe showed that the observed flow results from several structures rather than from a single isolated concentration.

=== Identification of the Norma region ===
Observations during the 1990s and early 2000s improved knowledge of the structures hidden behind the Milky Way. Infrared surveys identified galaxies whose visible light was obscured by Galactic dust, while radio observations detected the 21-centimeter line emitted by neutral hydrogen. X-ray surveys were particularly important because hot gas within massive galaxy clusters emits strongly at X-ray wavelengths.

These studies identified the Norma Cluster, also known as Abell 3627 or ACO 3627, as one of the principal mass concentrations near the center of the Great Attractor region. The cluster lies approximately 220 million light-years from the Milky Way and is among the nearest particularly massive galaxy clusters.

== Location and visibility ==
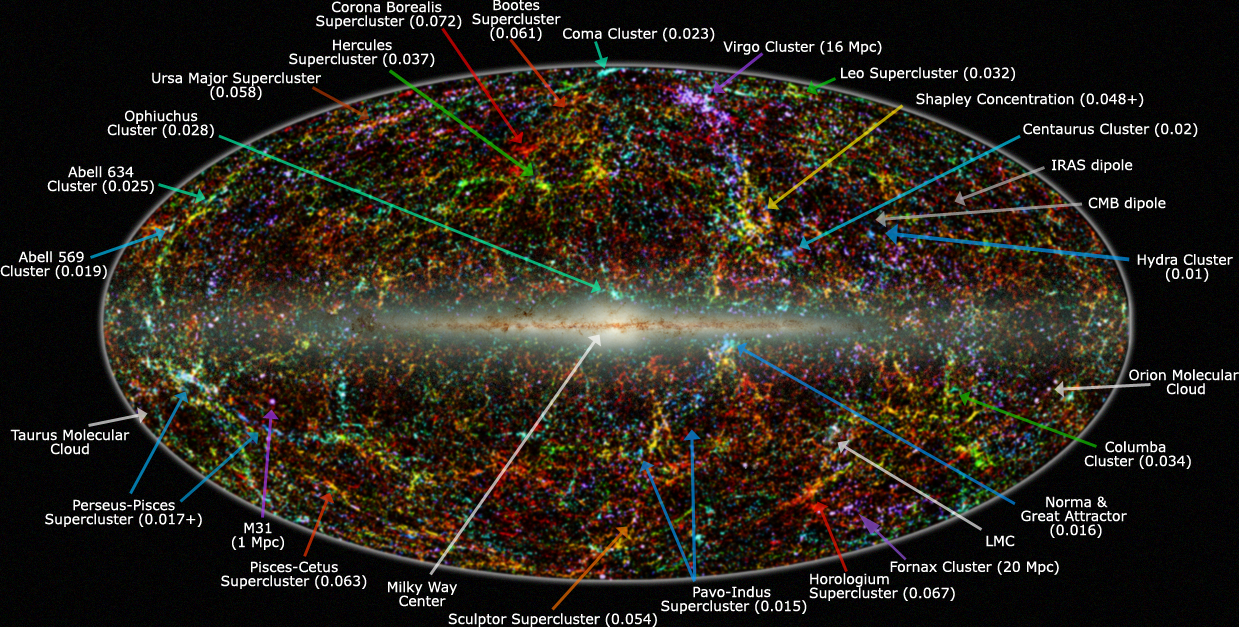
Near-infrared panoramic view of the sky based on the Two Micron All-Sky Survey. The approximate direction of the Great Attractor is indicated by the long blue arrow at lower right.

The Great Attractor lies in the direction of the constellations Norma and Triangulum Australe, near Galactic longitude 307° and Galactic latitude 9°. Distance estimates have varied according to the structures being considered, but the central Norma region lies roughly 150–250 million light-years away.

The region falls partly within the Zone of Avoidance, a band of sky in which extragalactic observations are obstructed by stars, dust, and gas in the Milky Way. The obscuration affects a substantial portion of the extragalactic sky and is strongest near the Galactic center. Broad surveys in the optical, near infra-red, far-infrared, and x-ray spectral ranges have shown that most of the structures behind the Milky Way have been discovered but detailed cosmographic maps require combining these surveys with corrections for the optical extinction caused by the intervening gas.

== Estimated mass and larger-scale influences ==
Early calculations treated the Great Attractor as a relatively localized concentration with a mass on the order of 10^{16} solar masses. The incompleteness of galaxy surveys near the Galactic plane, uncertainties in distance indicators, and assumptions about the distribution of unseen matter made these estimates difficult.

In 1992, researchers argued that part of the inferred infall signal had been amplified by Malmquist bias, a selection effect in which intrinsically brighter objects are overrepresented at greater distances. Correcting for this bias reduced some estimates of the motion directed toward the Great Attractor.

During the early 2000s, the Clusters in the Zone of Avoidance project used X-ray observations to identify massive clusters hidden behind the Milky Way. Its results indicated that the Norma region was much less massive than some early estimates and that a substantial part of the Local Group's motion is produced by more distant structures, especially the Shapley Supercluster.

The relative contributions of nearby and distant structures depend on the scale over which the velocity field is reconstructed. On intermediate scales, flows converge in the Hydra–Centaurus and Great Attractor region; on larger scales, the Shapley concentration becomes increasingly important.

== Norma Wall ==
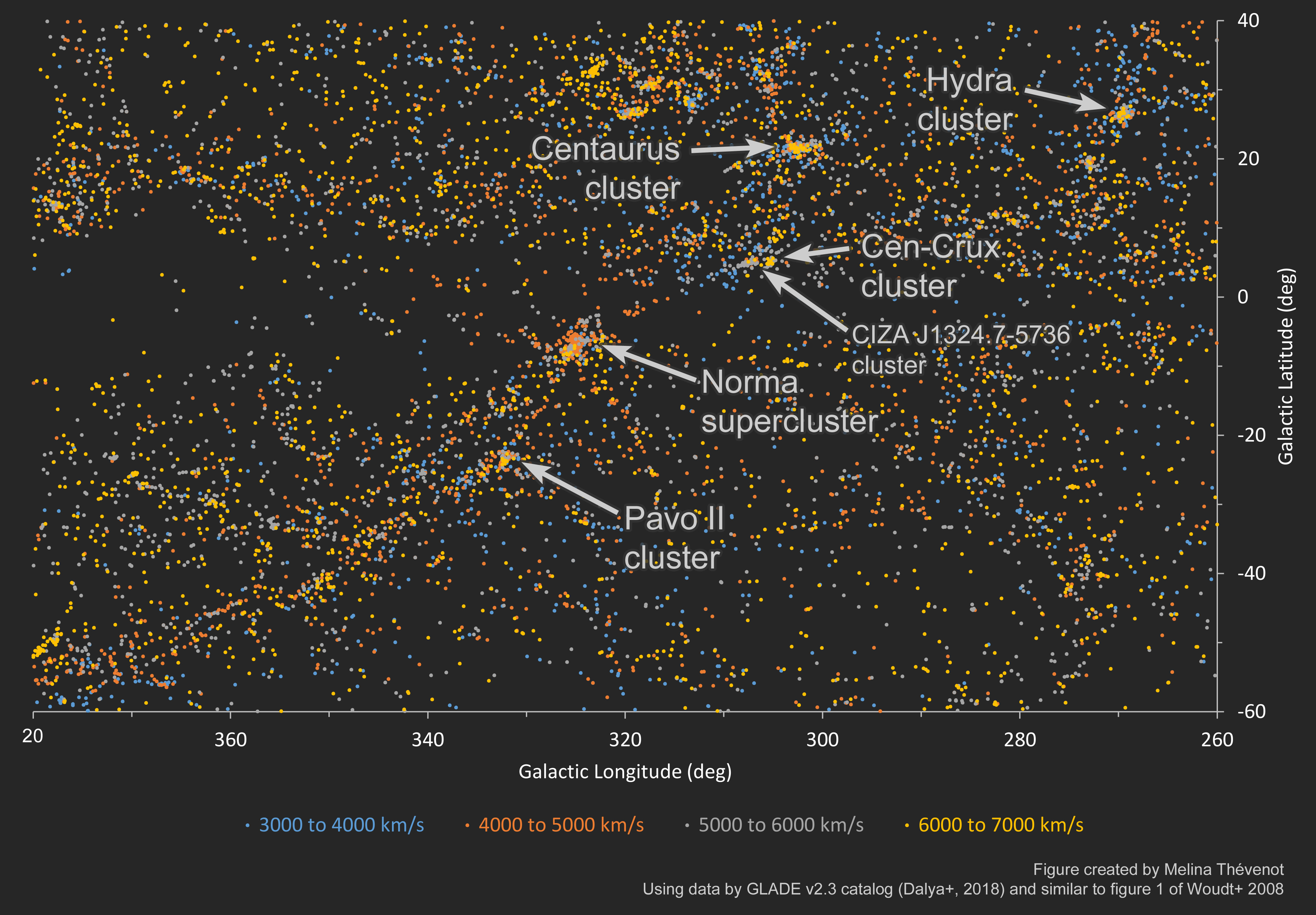
The Great Attractor region, showing the Pavo II, Norma, Centaurus–Crux, and CIZA J1324.7−5736 clusters associated with the Norma Wall

The Norma Wall, also called the Great Attractor Wall, is a large galaxy filament extending across the Great Attractor region.

The structure includes the Pavo II, Norma, Centaurus–Crux, and CIZA J1324.7−5736 clusters. Observations suggest that the wall extends through the constellations Centaurus, Norma, and Vela, crossing an area that is partly hidden by the Milky Way.

The Norma Cluster is the most massive known cluster within the central portion of the wall. Dynamical studies have found that it is a rich and massive cluster whose galaxy velocities and hot intracluster gas make it an important contributor to the gravitational field of the Great Attractor region.

The full dimensions and mass distribution of the Norma Wall remain difficult to determine because a substantial portion lies within the Zone of Avoidance.

== Relationship to the Laniakea Supercluster ==
In 2014, R. Brent Tully and collaborators introduced the name Laniakea for the basin of attraction containing the Milky Way. Instead of defining a supercluster only as a visible overdensity of galaxies, they used reconstructed peculiar-velocity flows to trace a boundary analogous to a terrestrial watershed.

Under this model, galaxy flows within Laniakea converge toward the vicinity of the Norma and Centaurus clusters, near the traditional position of the Great Attractor. The proposed structure spans approximately 500 million light-years and contains the Virgo Supercluster, the Hydra–Centaurus region, the Pavo–Indus Supercluster, and other nearby groups and filaments. Later studies verified that the Laniakea supercluster model is consistent with the structure called the Great Attractor. Later models suggest Laniakea may be part of even larger structures.

== Shapley concentration ==
The Shapley Supercluster lies substantially farther from the Milky Way than the Norma Cluster and contains one of the greatest known concentrations of galaxies in the nearby universe. It is located in approximately the same broad region of the sky as the Great Attractor but at a greater distance.

Studies of the peculiar-velocity field indicate that the Shapley concentration contributes significantly to the motion of the Local Group and the Great Attractor region. The Great Attractor is itself moving generally toward Shapley rather than acting as the ultimate endpoint of all nearby flows.

This relationship helps explain why the mass inferred from the original Great Attractor model appeared insufficient to produce the full observed motion of the Milky Way and nearby galaxies. The Local Group's velocity results from the combined gravitational influence of several concentrations and voids distributed across hundreds of millions of light-years.

== See also ==
- Big Crunch – Hypothetical scenario for the ultimate fate of the universe
- CfA2 Great Wall – Galaxy wall in the constellation Coma
- Cosmic web – Concept in cosmology
- Dark flow – Controversial hypothesis in astrophysics
- Dark matter – Hypothetical invisible cosmic material
- Dipole repeller – Center of effective repulsion in the large-scale flow of galaxies near the Milky Way
- Hercules–Corona Borealis Great Wall – Possible large cosmic structure
- Large-scale structure of the universe – Concept in cosmology
- South Pole Wall – Massive cosmic structure
