= Abell 2667 =

Galaxy cluster in the constellation Sculptor

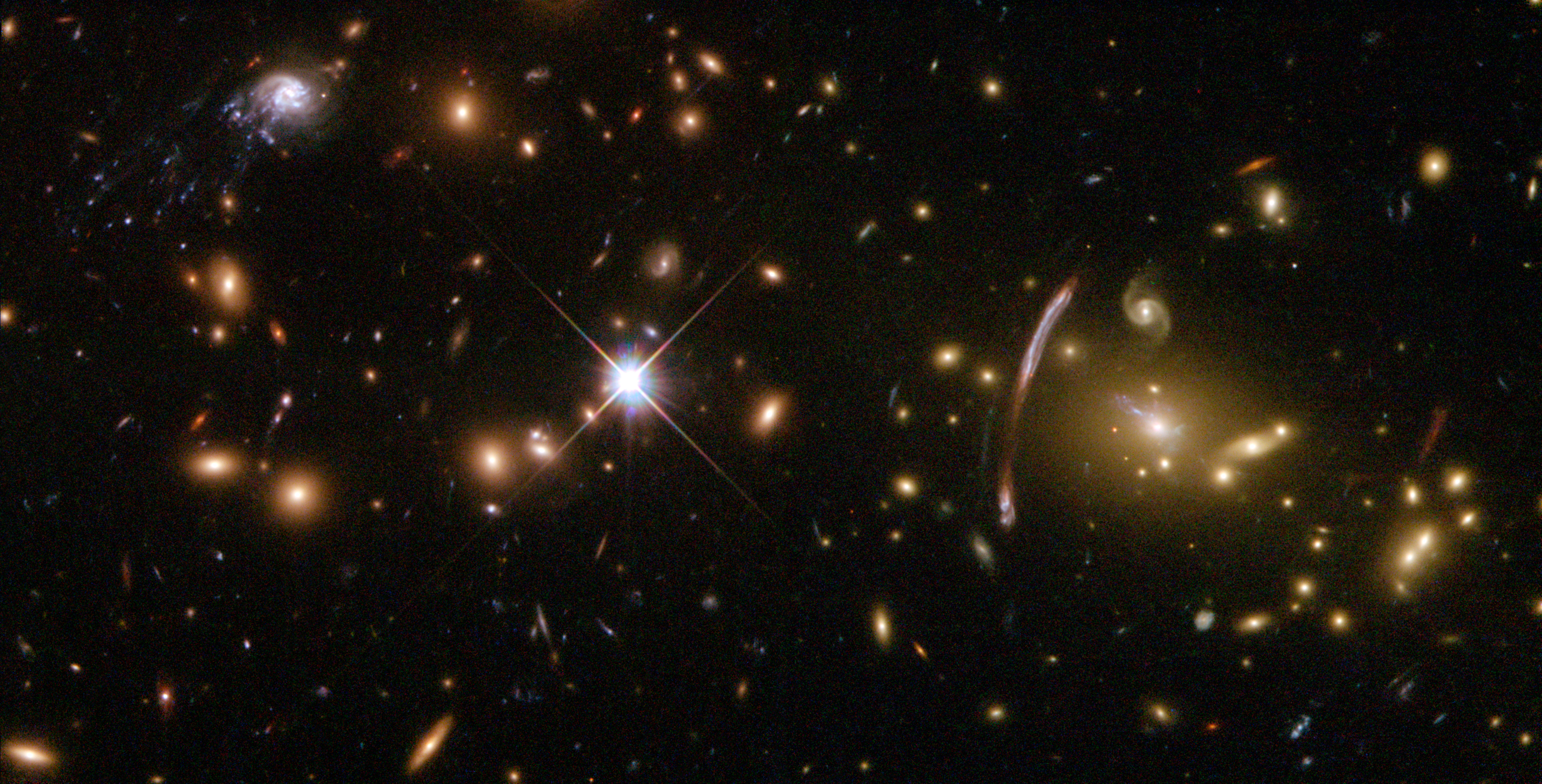
- Hubble Space Telescope view of Abell 2667. Comet Galaxy is top-left (blue).

Observation data (Epoch J2000)
- Constellation: Sculptor
- Right ascension: 23^{h} 51^{m} 42^{s}
- Declination: −26° 00′ 00″
- Richness class: 3
- Bautz–Morgan classification: I
- Redshift: 0.23000
- Distance: 927 Mpc (3,023 Mly) h^{−1}_{0.705}

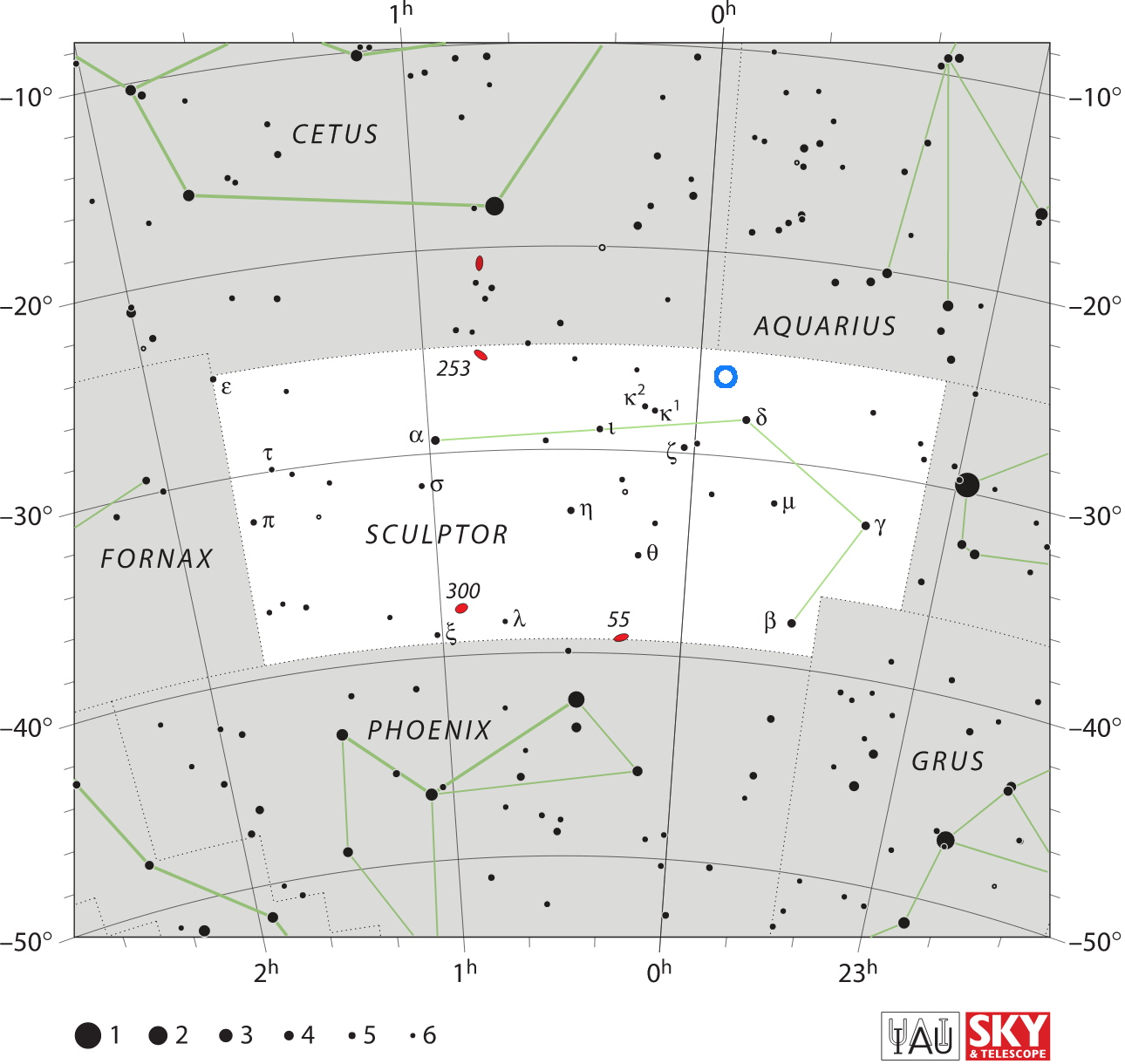
The location of Abell 2667 (circled in blue)

Abell 2667 is a galaxy cluster. It is one of the most luminous galaxy clusters in the X-ray waveband known at a redshift about 0.2 and is a well-known gravitational lens.

Abell 2667 is similar to many other low-redshift and cool-core galaxy clusters in terms of the cooling processes that happen at its center, which consists of a brightest cluster galaxy (BCG) and a supermassive black hole (SMBH).

Abell 2667 acts as an intense gravitational telescope, lensing red-shifted galaxies behind it. Although the warped galaxies may appear to be part of this galaxy cluster, they are in fact significantly more distant.

== Comet Galaxy ==
On 2 March 2007, a team of astronomers reported the detection of the Comet Galaxy in this cluster. This galaxy is being ripped apart by the cluster's gravitational field and harsh environment. The finding sheds light on the mysterious process by which gas-rich spiral-shaped galaxies might evolve into gas-poor irregular or elliptical-shaped galaxies over billions of years.

== See also ==
- Abell catalogue
- List of Abell clusters
- X-ray astronomy
