= NGC 4650 =

Galaxy in the constellation Centaurus

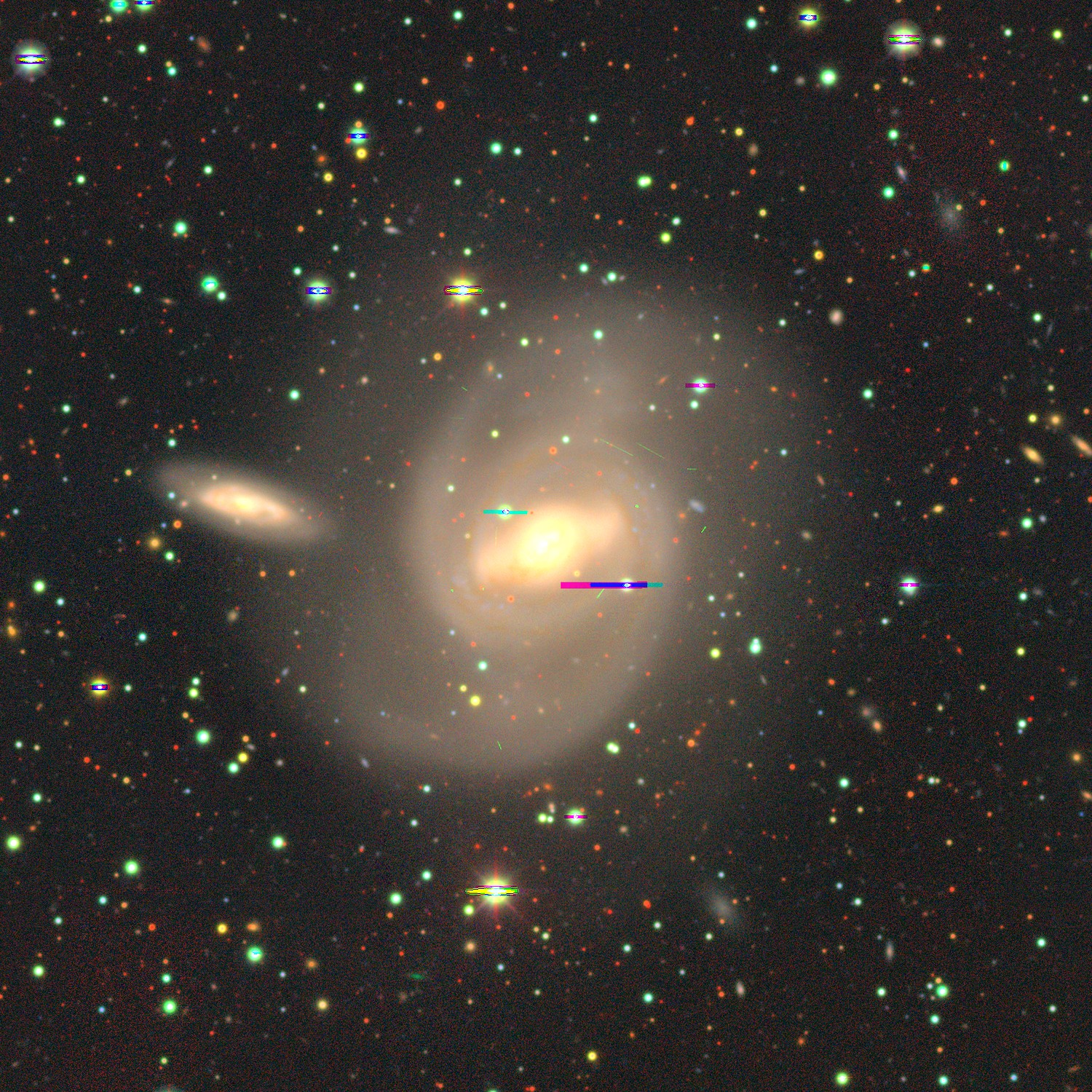
- NGC 4650 (center) and LEDA 42911 (left) imaged by Legacy Surveys

Observation data (J2000 epoch)
- Constellation: Centaurus
- Right ascension: 12^{h} 44^{m} 19.6045^{s}
- Declination: −40° 43′ 54.403″
- Redshift: 0.009850±0.000123
- Heliocentric radial velocity: 2,953±37 km/s
- Distance: 155.8 ± 11.2 Mly (47.77 ± 3.44 Mpc)
- Group or cluster: NGC 4696 group (LGG 298); Centaurus Cluster
- Apparent magnitude (V): 12.6

Characteristics
- Type: SB(rs)a
- Size: ~199,800 ly (61.25 kpc) (estimated)
- Apparent size (V): 3.2′ × 2.8′

Other designations
- ESO 322- G 067, IRAS 12415-4027, 2MASX J12441959-4043546, MCG -07-26-038, PGC 42891

NGC 4650 is a large barred spiral galaxy in the constellation of Centaurus. Its velocity with respect to the cosmic microwave background is 3,239±42 km/s, which corresponds to a Hubble distance of 155.8 ± 11.2 Mly (47.77 ± 3.44 Mpc). Additionally, one non-redshift measurement gives a closer distance of 151.34 Mly (46.400 Mpc). It was discovered by British astronomer John Herschel on 26 June 1834.

NGC 4650 is a Seyfert II galaxy, i.e. it has a quasar-like nucleus with very high surface brightnesses whose spectra reveal strong, high-ionisation emission lines, but unlike quasars, the host galaxy is clearly detectable.

== NGC 4696 group and Centaurus Cluster ==
NGC 4650 belongs to the 79-member NGC 4696 galaxy group (also known as LGG 298). Some of the other members in the group include NGC 4373, NGC 4499, NGC 4507, NGC 4553, NGC 4743, NGC 4744, NGC 4767, NGC 4811, NGC 4812 and NGC 4832. NGC 4650 is also a member of the Centaurus Cluster.

== See also ==
- List of NGC objects (4001–5000)
