= IC 3370 =

Elliptical galaxy in the constellation Centaurus

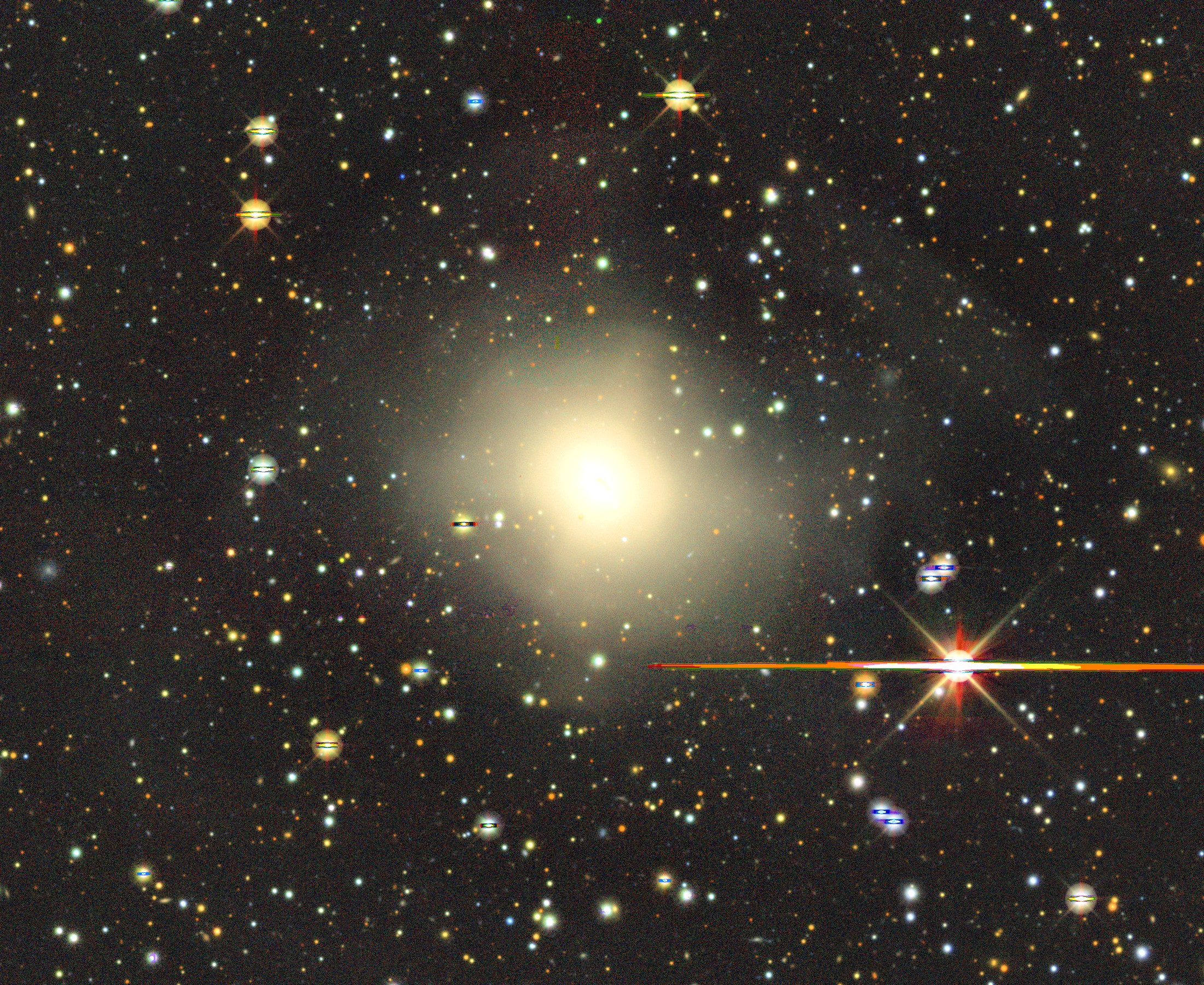
- IC 3370 imaged by Legacy Surveys

Observation data (J2000 epoch)
- Constellation: Centaurus
- Right ascension: 12^{h} 27^{m} 37.3283^{s}
- Declination: −39° 20′ 15.985″
- Redshift: 0.009773 ± 0.000080
- Heliocentric radial velocity: 2,930 km/s
- Distance: 156 Mly (47.61 ± 3.37 Mpc)
- Apparent magnitude (V): 10.9
- Apparent magnitude (B): 11.9

Characteristics
- Type: E2-3
- Size: 68.08 kiloparsecs (222,000 light-years) (diameter; 2MASS K-band total isophote)

Other designations
- AM 1224-390, IRAS F12249-3903, MCG -06-27-029, PGC 40887

IC 3370 is an elliptical galaxy located in the constellation of Centaurus. It is located 156 million light-years from Earth. It was discovered by American astronomer Lewis Swift on 30 January 1898. According to the SIMBAD database, IC 3370 is said to be a LINER galaxy but also a Seyfert type II galaxy. The luminosity of the galaxy is estimated to have a B magnitude of -22.3, similar to other elliptical galaxies.

== Description ==
IC 3370 is classified as an E2-E3 elliptical galaxy with a bright nucleus. The galaxy has a box-shaped appearance similar to LEDA 74886, although some studies classified it as a peculiar lenticular galaxy (S0pec). It has isophotal twisting in its galactic bulge to a significant extent between 0 and 70 arcseconds, indicating the galaxy might have gone through a tidal-encounter or a galaxy merger. There are also dust patches covering most of the nuclear regions in the galaxy with signatures of X-ray isotopes and cylindrical rotation. The inner disk of the galaxy is shown to be rotating at speeds of 100 km s^{−1}. It has a dust lane running through the galaxy's central region.

== NGC 4696 group ==
According to A. M. Garcia, IC 3370 belongs to the 79-member NGC 4696 galaxy group (also known as LGG 298). Some of the other members in the group include NGC 4373, NGC 4499, NGC 4507, NGC 4553, NGC 4743, NGC 4744, NGC 4767, NGC 4811, NGC 4812 and NGC 4832.
