= NGC 4483 =

Galaxy in the constellation of Virgo

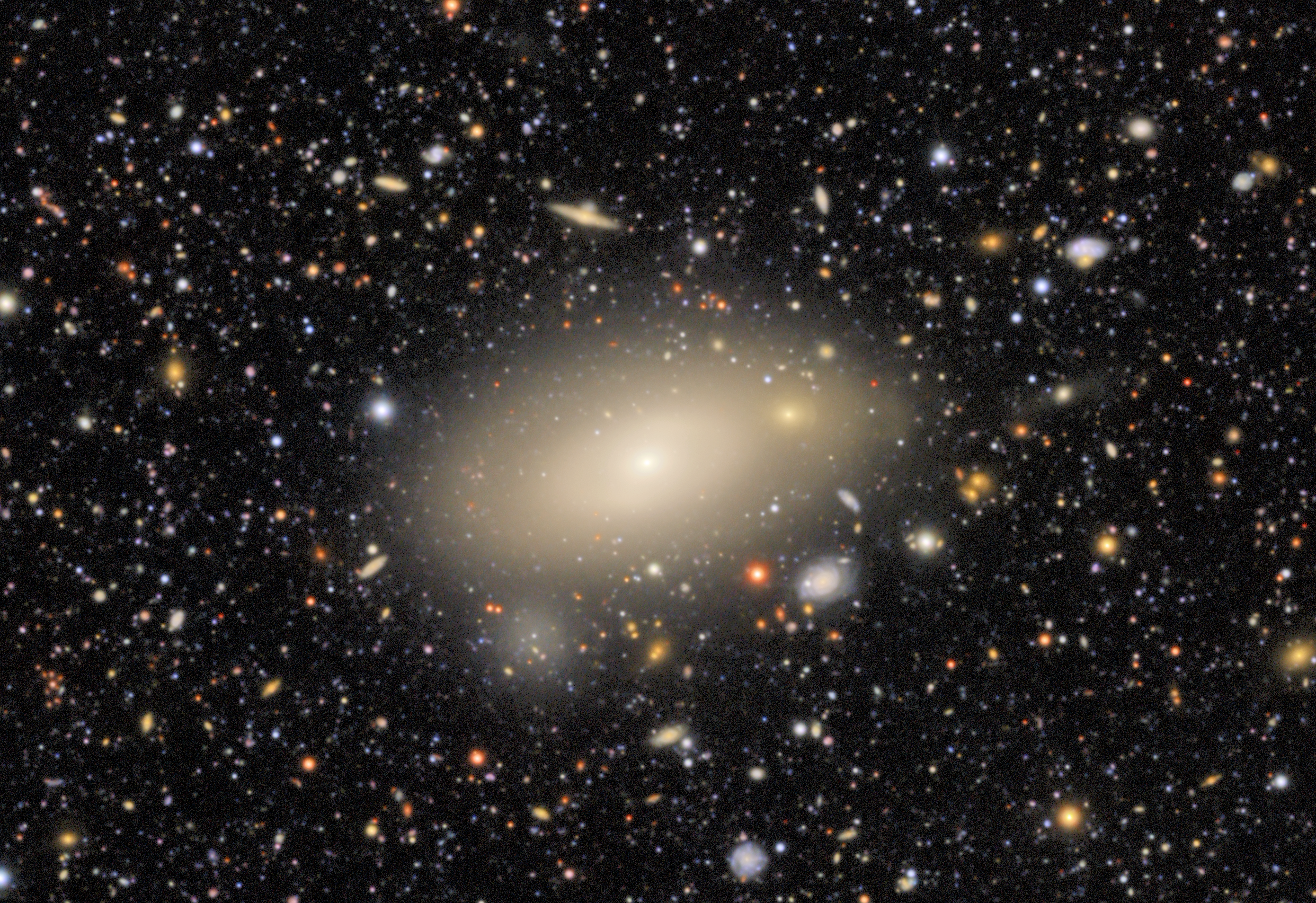
- NGC 4483 imaged by the Vera C. Rubin Observatory

Observation data (J2000 epoch)
- Constellation: Virgo
- Right ascension: 12^{h} 30^{m} 40.6^{s}
- Declination: 09° 00′ 56″
- Redshift: 0.003022/906 km/s
- Distance: 55.4 Mly
- Group or cluster: Virgo Cluster
- Apparent magnitude (V): 12.9

Characteristics
- Type: SB0^+(s)
- Size: ~31,100 ly
- Apparent size (V): 1.74 x 0.92

Other designations
- CGCG 70-136, MCG 2-32-103, PGC 41339, UGC 7649, VCC 1303

NGC 4483 is a dwarf barred lenticular galaxy located about 55 million light-years away in the constellation of Virgo. NGC 4483 is a member of the Virgo Cluster, specifically it is located towards the central region of the cluster. The closest bright galaxy to NGC 4483 is IC 3430.

NGC 4483 was discovered by astronomer Heinrich d'Arrest on March 19, 1865.

== Characteristics ==
NGC 4483 has a stellar mass of 7.5x10^9 solar masses. It is host to a short and weak bar with a radius of 2.1 kiloparsecs.

== See also ==
- List of NGC objects (4001–5000)
- NGC 4340
