= NGC 4622 =

Galaxy in the constellation Centaurus

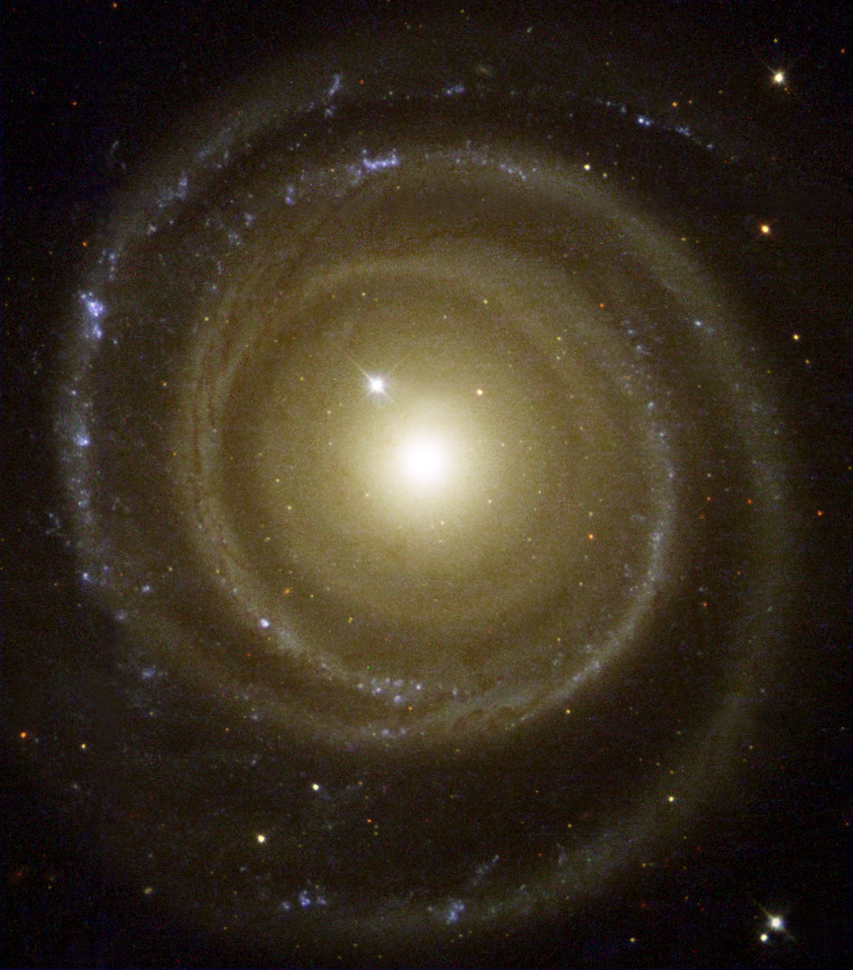
- A Hubble Space Telescope (HST) image of NGC 4622

Observation data (J2000 epoch)
- Constellation: Centaurus
- Right ascension: 12^{h} 42^{m} 37.7^{s}
- Declination: −40° 44′ 35″
- Redshift: 4,367 ± 39 km/s
- Distance: 200 million ly
- Apparent magnitude (V): 12.6

Characteristics
- Type: SA(r)ab
- Apparent size (V): 1′.7 × 1′.6

Other designations
- PGC 42701

NGC 4622, also known as the Backward Galaxy, is a face-on unbarred spiral galaxy with a very prominent ring structure located in the constellation Centaurus. The galaxy is a member of the Centaurus Cluster.

== Spiral structure ==
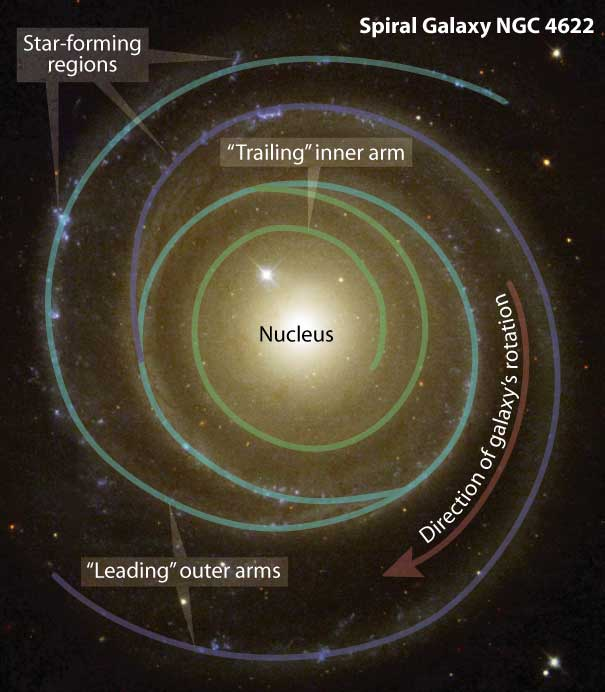
Based only on their shape, one would expect from observations of other spiral galaxies that the outermost spiral arms (blue and blue-green) move by rotating counterclockwise around the center of the galaxy. This is not the case; the outermost spiral arms rotate clockwise, just like the inner spiral arm and the rest of the galaxy's disk. Additionally, the "trailing" inner spiral arm (green) and the "leading" outer spiral arms (blue and blue-green) curl around the galaxy in opposite directions (although both move clockwise around the galaxy's center).

The spiral galaxy NGC 4622 lies approximately 111 million light-years away from Earth in the constellation Centaurus. NGC 4622 is an example of a galaxy with leading spiral arms. Each spiral arm winds away from the center of the galaxy and ends at an outermost tip that "points" in a certain direction (away from the arm). Spiral arms were thought to always trail, meaning that the outermost tip of every spiral arm points away from the direction of the disk's orbital rotation. This is true of the inner spiral arm of NGC 4622 but not of its outer spiral arms. The outer arms of NGC 4622 are instead leading spiral arms, meaning the tips of the spiral arms point towards the direction of disk rotation. This may be the result of a gravitational interaction between NGC 4622 and another galaxy or the result of a merger between NGC 4622 and a smaller object.

NGC 4622 also has a single inner trailing spiral arm. Although it was originally suspected that the inner spiral arm was a leading arm, the observations that established that the outer arms were leading also established that the inner arm was trailing.

These results were met with skepticism in part because they contradicted conventional wisdom with one quote being "so you're the backward astronomers who found the backward galaxy." Astronomical objections centered on the fact that dust reddening and cloud silhouettes were used to determine that the outer arms lead. The galaxy disk is tilted only 19 degrees from face-on making near to far-side effects of dust hard to discern and because clumpy dust clouds might be concentrated on one side of the disk, creating misleading results.

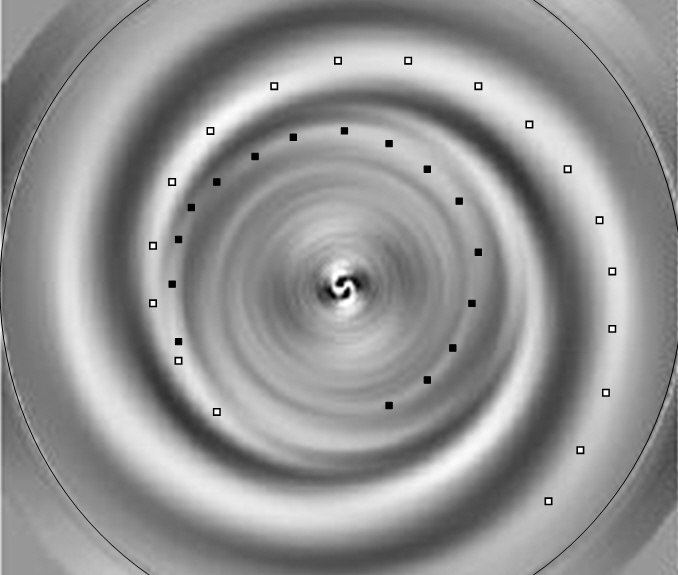
A simulation of the NGC 4622 arm pairs, exhibiting the Fourier transform m = 2

In response, new research determined NGC 4622's spiral arm sense with a method independent of the previous work. The Fourier component method reveals two new weak arms in the inner disk winding opposite the outer strong clockwise pair. Thus the galaxy must have a pair of arms winding in the opposite direction from most galaxies. Analysis of a color-age star formation angle sequence of the Fourier components establishes that the strong outer pair is the leading pair.

A Fourier component image of the arm pairs is shown with one of the pair of arms marked for the newly discovered inner CCW pair (black dots) as well as one of the already known (CW) outer pair (white dots).

== Supernovae ==
Two supernovae have been observed in NGC 4622:

- SN 2001jx (type unknown, mag. 17.5) was captured on an image taken by the Hubble Space Telescope on 25 May 2001. It was discovered by R. Buta and G. G. Byrd of the University of Alabama, as well as T. Freeman of Bevill State Community College. The type of supernova was not determined.
- SN 2019so (Type Ia-91bg-like, mag. 18.535) was discovered by ATLAS on 14 January 2019.

== Group and cluster ==
According to AM Garcia, NGC 4622 is a member of the NGC 4709 group which consists of at least 42 galaxies including NGC 4616, NGC 4622B (also called PGC 42852), NGC 4679 and NGC 4709.

The NGC 4709 group is part of the Centaurus Cluster.

== See also ==
- Messier 64 – a spiral galaxy with its gas disk orbiting opposite the disk of stars
