= NGC 4709 =

Galaxy in the constellation Centaurus

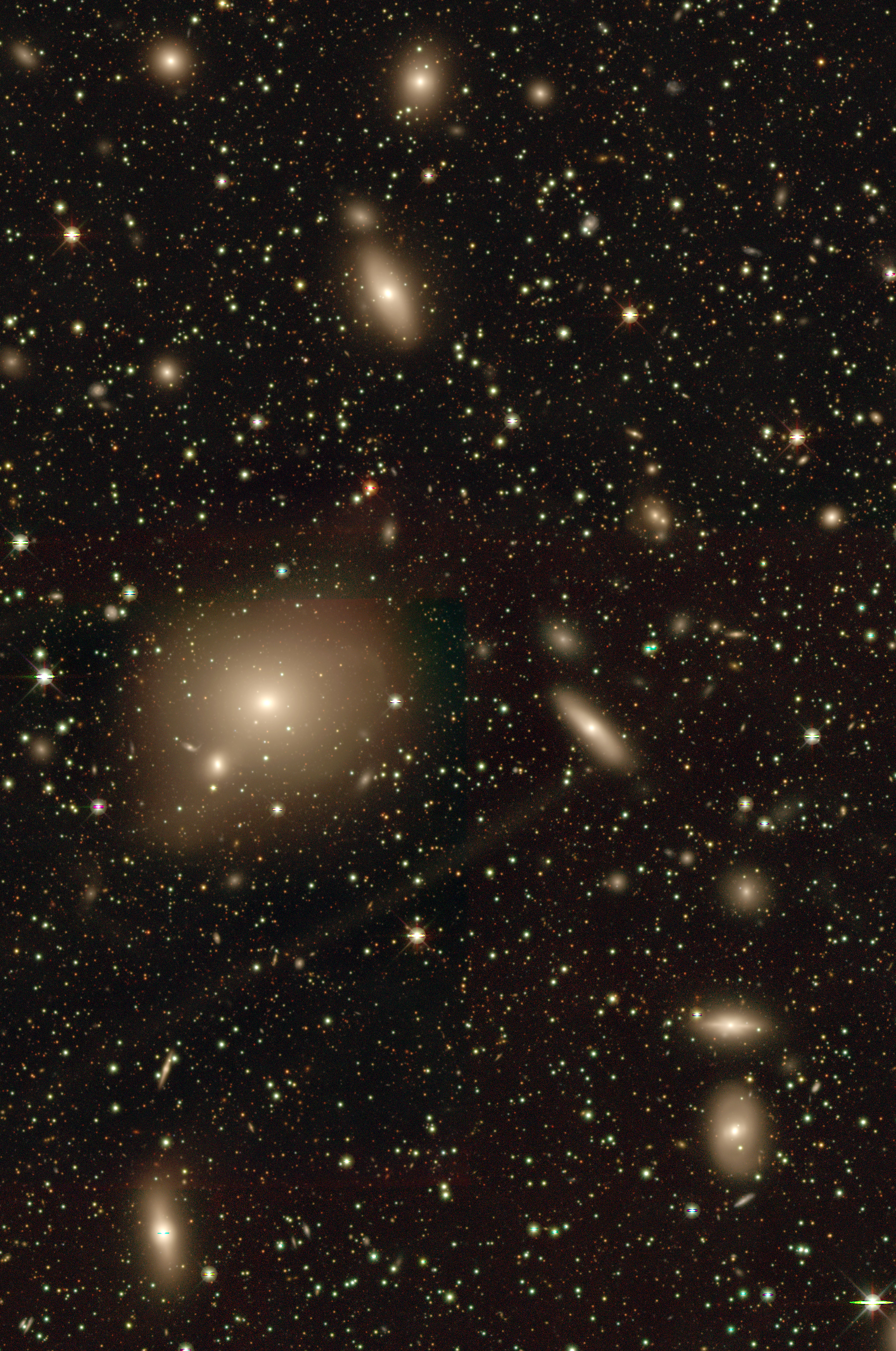
- legacy surveys image of NGC 4709 (large galaxy in the middle), as well as other galaxies of the Centaurus Cluster, including NGC 4706.

Observation data (J2000 epoch)
- Constellation: Centaurus
- Right ascension: 12^{h} 50^{m} 03.9^{s}
- Declination: −41° 22′ 55″
- Redshift: 0.015604
- Heliocentric radial velocity: 4678 km/s
- Distance: 150 Mly (45 Mpc)
- Group or cluster: Centaurus Cluster (Cen 45 subgroup)
- Apparent magnitude (V): 12.0

Characteristics
- Type: E1
- Size: ~127,700 ly (39.14 kpc) (estimated)
- Apparent size (V): 2.4 x 2.0

Other designations
- ESO 323-3, CCC 130, MCG -7-26-56, PGC 43423

NGC 4709 is an elliptical galaxy located in the constellation Centaurus. It is considered to be a member of the Centaurus Cluster and is the dominant member of a small group of galaxies known as "Cen 45" which is currently merging with the main Centaurus Cluster (Cen 30) even though the two subclusters' line of sight redshift velocities differ by about 1500 km/s. NGC 4709 was discovered by astronomer James Dunlop on May 7, 1826.

== Distance estimates ==
Lucey et al. suggests that NGC 4709 and the Cen 45 subgroup lie at about the same distance as the main Centaurus Cluster which is about 150 Mly (45 Mpc).

== See also ==
- List of NGC objects (4001–5000)
- NGC 4696
