= NGC 4930 =

Galaxy in the constellation Centaurus

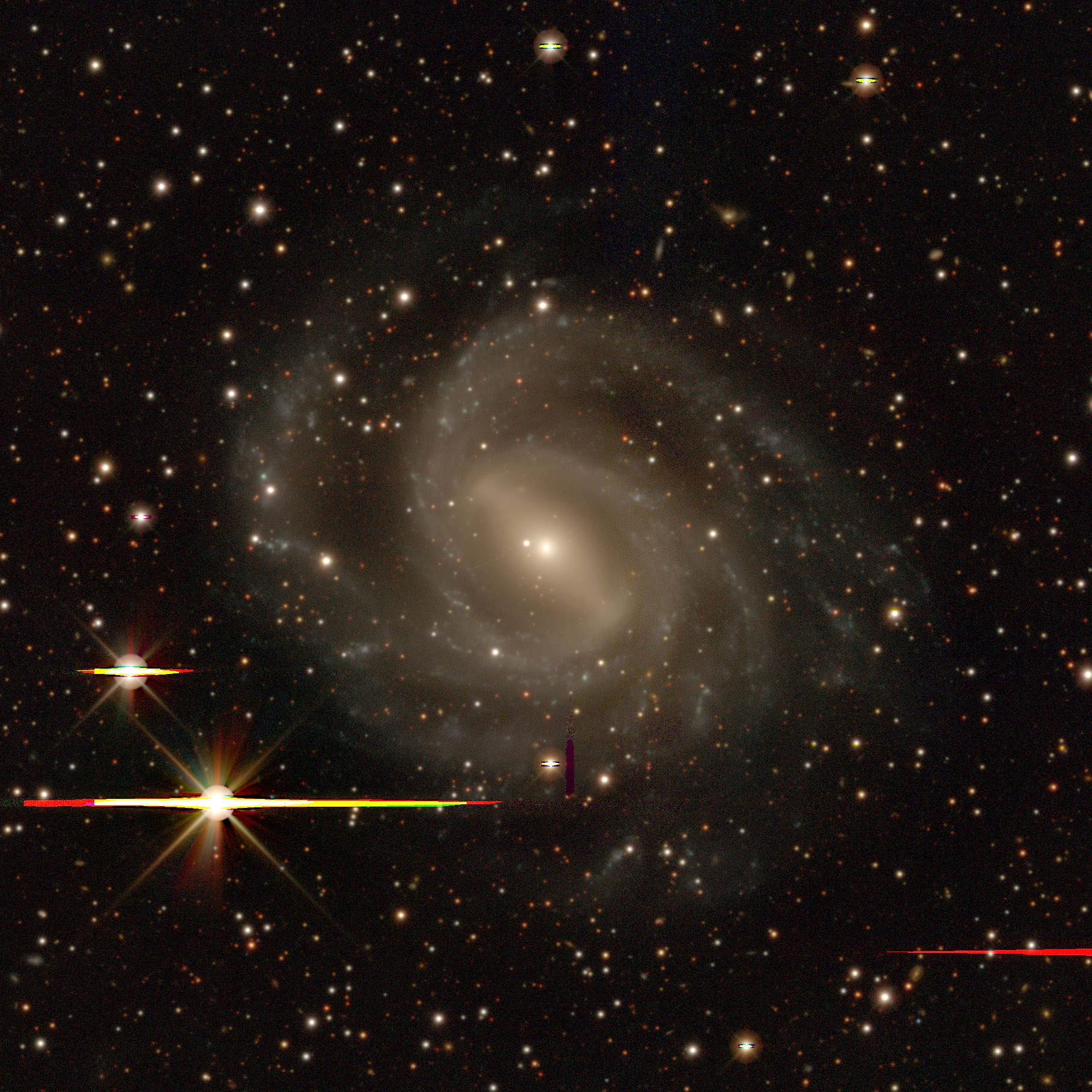
- NGC 4930 imaged by Legacy Surveys

Observation data (J2000 epoch)
- Constellation: Centaurus
- Right ascension: 13^{h} 04^{m} 05.2162^{s}
- Declination: −41° 24′ 41.343″
- Redshift: 0.008636 ± 0.000010
- Heliocentric radial velocity: 2,589 ± 3 km/s
- Distance: 78.4 ± 50.5 Mly (24.05 ± 15.5 Mpc)
- Group or cluster: NGC 4930 Group
- Apparent magnitude (V): 11.5

Characteristics
- Type: SB(rs)bc
- Size: ~80,000 ly (24.5 kpc) (estimated)
- Apparent size (V): 4.5′ × 3.7′

Other designations
- ESO 323- G 074, IRAS 13012-4108, MCG -07-27-029, PGC 45155

NGC 4930 is a barred spiral galaxy in the constellation Centaurus. The galaxy lies about 80 million light years away from Earth, which means, given its apparent dimensions, that NGC 4930 is approximately 80,000 light years across. It was discovered by John Herschel on June 8, 1834.

NGC 4930 is a barred spiral galaxy with a prominent long bar. The nucleus is small and bright and the bulge is elliptical. At the end of the bar a ring has been formed which is slightly brighter at the points it intersects with the bar. Faint arms emerge from the ring. The kinematics and hydrogen distribution of the galaxy as observed in hydrogen line appear relatively normal. The star formation rate of the galaxy is estimated to be about 1 M_{☉} per year. In the centre of the galaxy lies a supermassive black hole, whose mass is estimated to be 10^{6.33 ± 0.38} (0.9 - 5.1 millions) M_{☉}, based on the pitch angle of the spiral arms.

NGC 4930 is the foremost member of the NGC 4930 Group, also known as LGG 325. Other members of the group include ESO 323- 55, ESO 323- 62, ESO 323- 67, ESO 323- 58 according to A. M. Garcia, while Makarov et al consider the galaxies ESO 323-55, ESO 323-58, ESO 323-59, ESO 323-67, and ESO 323-75. Crook et al considers the galaxy to form a triplet with galaxies ESO 323-60 and ESO 323-62. The group lies at the same cloud with the Centaurus Cluster, which lies at a projected distance of 2.5° to the west in the sky.
