= NGC 3124 =

Galaxy in the constellation Hydra

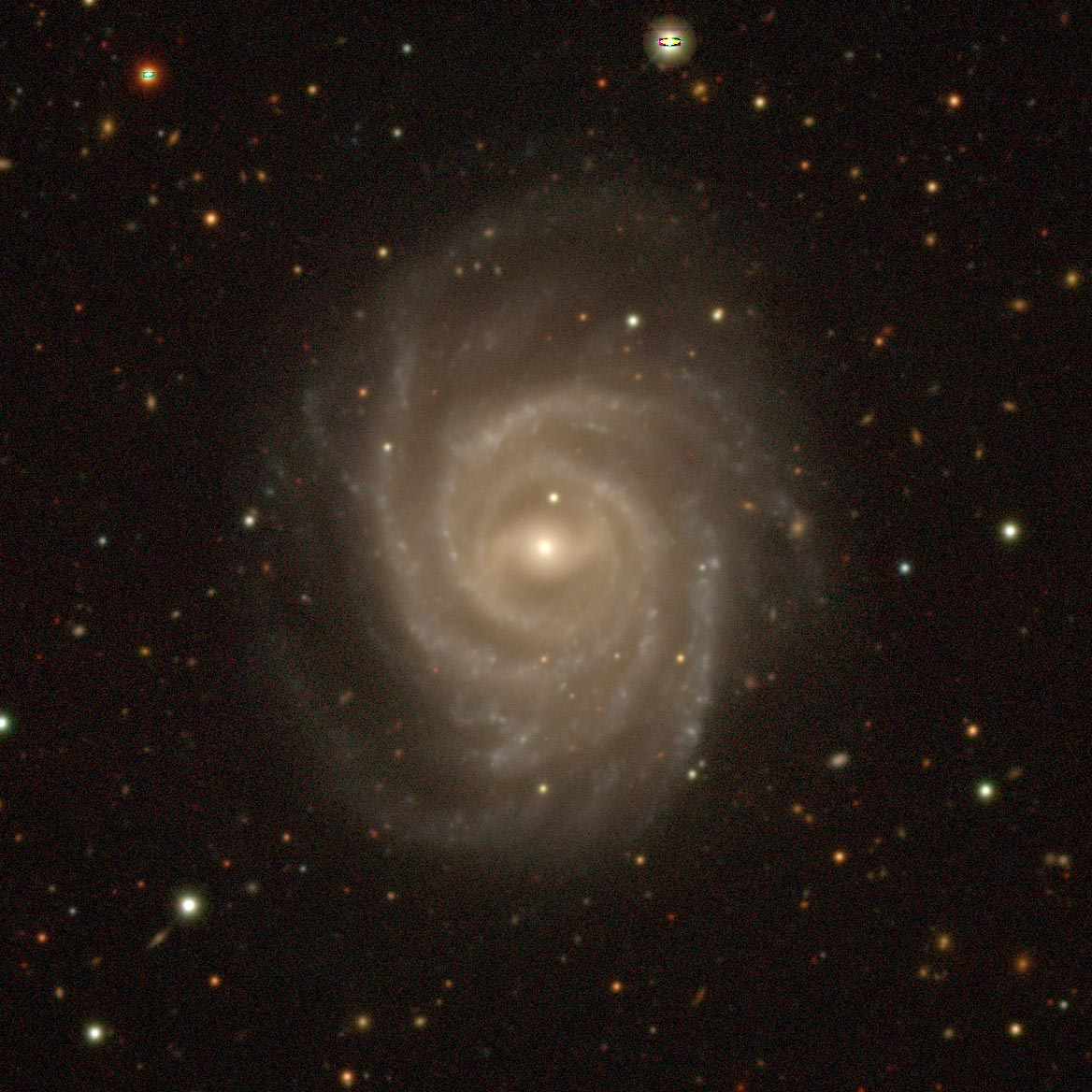
- NGC 3124 imaged by Legacy Surveys DR10

Observation data (J2000 epoch)
- Constellation: Hydra
- Right ascension: 10^{h} 06^{m} 39.9044^{s}
- Declination: −19° 13′ 17.421″
- Redshift: 0.011882 ± 0.000013
- Heliocentric radial velocity: 3,562 ± 4 km/s
- Distance: 111 ± 29.5 Mly (34.2 ± 9.1 Mpc)
- Group or cluster: NGC 3091 Group (LGG 186)
- Apparent magnitude (V): 12.0

Characteristics
- Type: SB(rs)c
- Size: ~143,100 ly (43.87 kpc) (estimated)
- Apparent size (V): 3.0′ × 2.5′

Other designations
- ESO 567- G 017, IRAS 10268-4423, UGCA 202, MCG -03-26-024, PGC 29377

NGC 3124 is a barred spiral galaxy in the constellation Hydra. The galaxy lies about 110 million light years away from Earth based on redshift-independent methods, which means, given its apparent dimensions, that NGC 3124 is approximately 120,000 light years across. Based on redshift the galaxy lies about 170 million light years away. It was discovered by John Herschel on March 23, 1835.

The galaxy is seen nearly face-on. The galaxy is considered barred, but in red light the bar looks more like two very open spiral arms which swirl in the opposite direction than the outer spiral arms. The dust in the bar however is curved in the same direction as the outer spirals. The gas kinematics are consistent across the galaxy. Treuthardt et al suggest that the counter-rotation of the bar is transient in nature and not due to a merger.

A ring has formed between the bar and the outer spiral arms. Two spiral arms emerge from the end of the bar. The arms are tightly wound and nearly overlap after half a revolution. After that they branch in multiple fragments that can be traced for about another half a revolution. The arms feature HII regions. In the centre of the galaxy there is a supermassive black hole whose mass is estimated to be (4.86±1.35)×10^{6} M_{☉}.

NGC 3124 forms a pair with 2MASX J10071106-1904039. NGC 3124 is a member of the NGC 3091 Group, also known as LGG 186, which also includes the galaxies NGC 3052, NGC 3091, UGCA 185, and MCG -03-26-006. Other nearby galaxies include NGC 2989, NGC 3028, NGC 3072, NGC 3076, NGC 3085, and NGC 3096.

== See also ==
- NGC 4622 - a similar galaxy with a counter-rotating inner spiral pattern
- List of NGC objects (3001–4000)
