= SN 2019so =

Supernova in NGC 4622

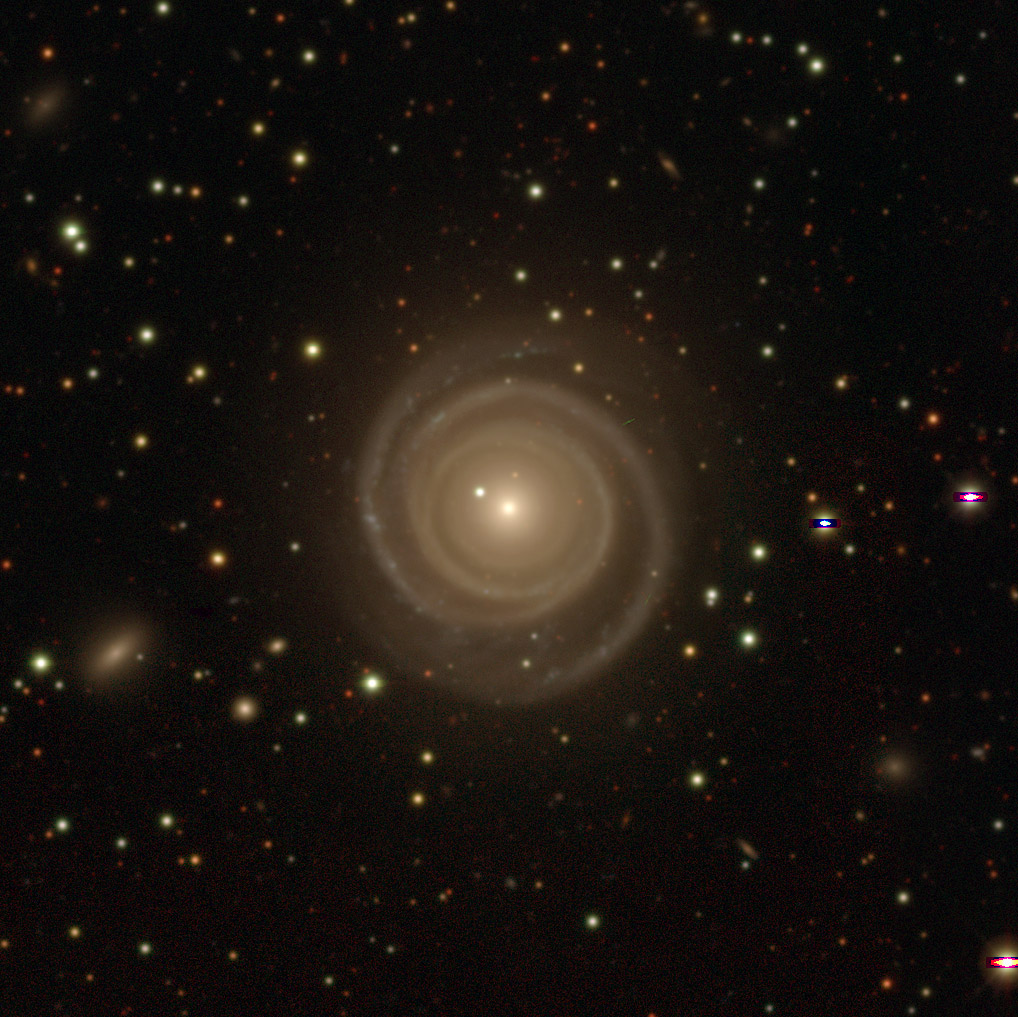
- SN 2019so occurred within the galaxy NGC 4622, also known as the backward galaxy due to its spiral arms facing the opposite direction to most spiral galaxies
- Type Ia
- Date: 2019
- Constellation: Centaurus
- Right ascension: 12^{h} 42^{m} 36.420^{s}
- Declination: −40° 44′ 46.79″
- Galactic coordinates: NGC 4622
- Distance: 200 million ly
- Redshift: 0.015

SN 2019so was a low redshift supernova in the Backward Galaxy (NGC 4622) located 200 million light years from Earth in the constellation of Centaurus.

It was discovered in the year 2019.

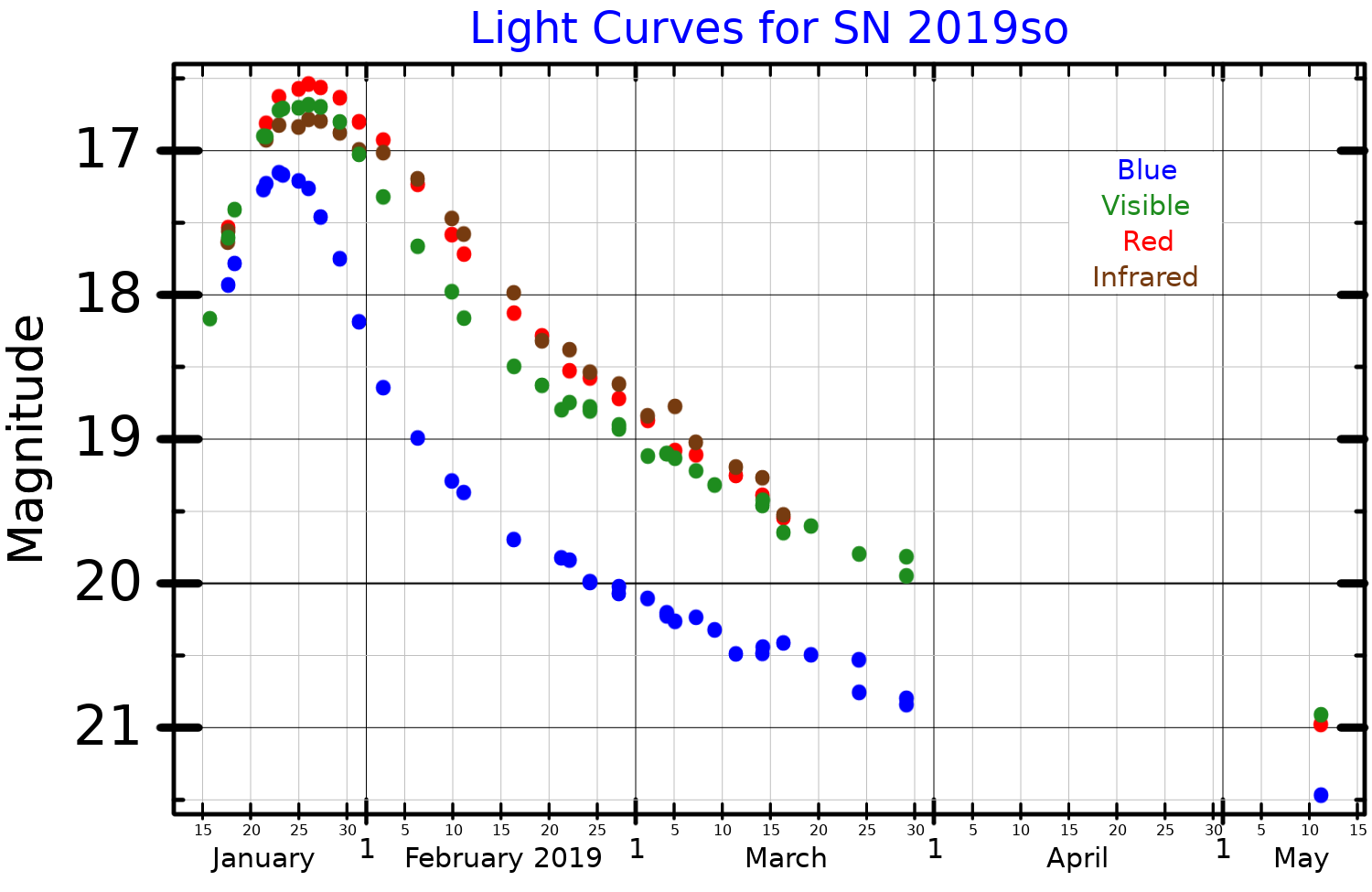
Light curves for SN 2019so in four photometric bands, plotted from data published by Chen et al. (2022)
