= NGC 4683 =

Galaxy in the constellation Centaurus

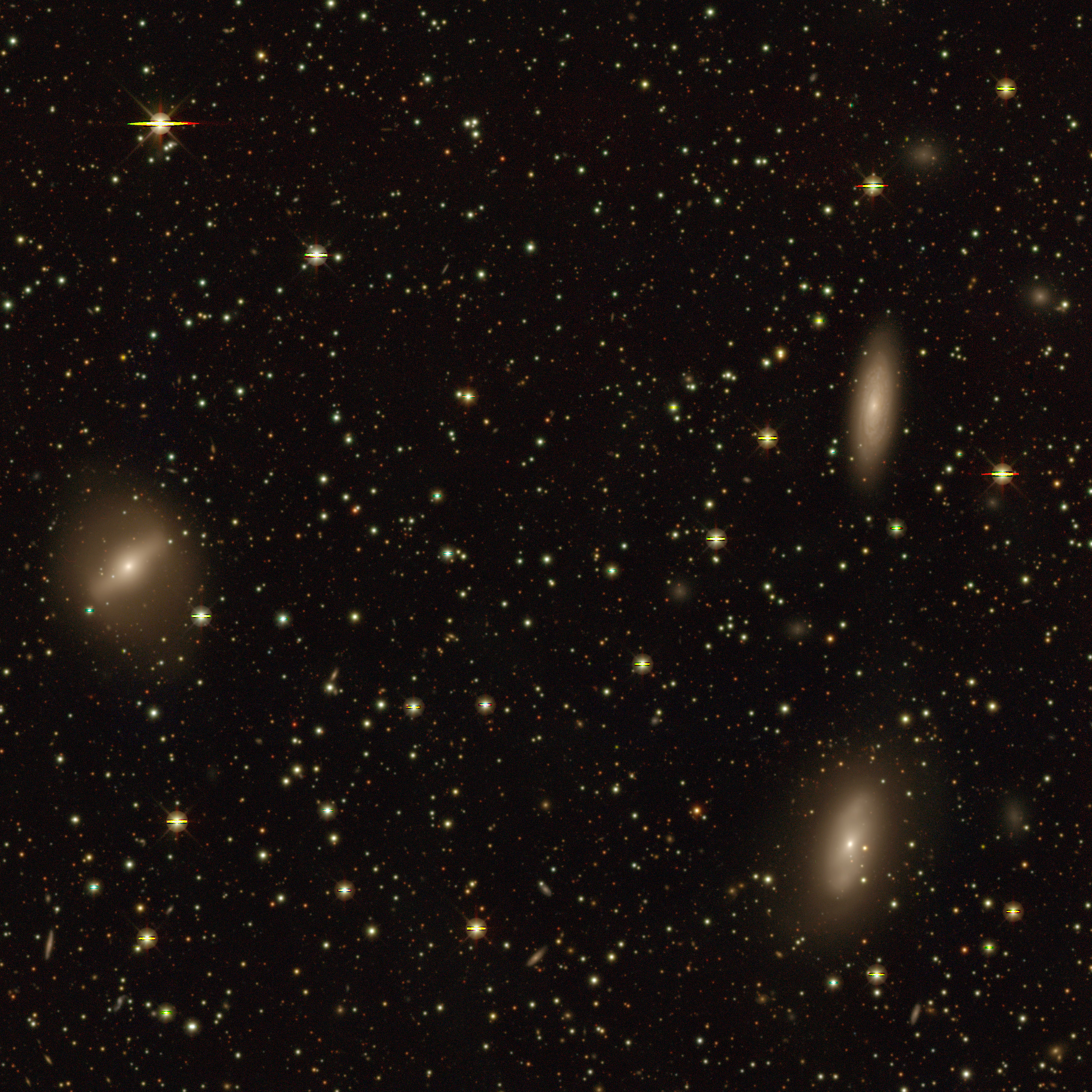
- legacy surveys image of NGC 4683 (left), NGC 4677 (lower right) and NGC 4696A (upper right).

Observation data (J2000 epoch)
- Constellation: Centaurus
- Right ascension: 12^{h} 47^{m} 42.4^{s}
- Declination: −41° 31′ 42″
- Redshift: 0.011908
- Heliocentric radial velocity: 3570 km/s
- Distance: 172 Mly (52.6 Mpc)
- Group or cluster: Centaurus Cluster
- Apparent magnitude (V): 13.8

Characteristics
- Type: SB0-(s)
- Size: ~76,500 ly (23.44 kpc) (estimated)
- Apparent size (V): 1.4 x 0.8

Other designations
- ESO 322-83, MCG -7-26-47, PGC 43182, CCC 008

NGC 4683 is a barred lenticular galaxy located about 170 million light-years away in the constellation Centaurus. It was discovered by astronomer John Herschel on June 8, 1834. NGC 4683 is a member of the Centaurus Cluster.

== See also ==
- List of NGC objects (4001–5000)
