= NGC 4729 =

Galaxy in the constellation Centaurus

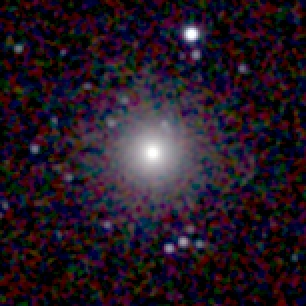
- 2MASS image of NGC 4729.

Observation data (J2000 epoch)
- Constellation: Centaurus
- Right ascension: 12^{h} 51^{m} 46.3^{s}
- Declination: −41° 07′ 56″
- Redshift: 0.011154
- Heliocentric radial velocity: 3344 km/s
- Distance: 161 Mly (49.5 Mpc)
- Group or cluster: Centaurus Cluster
- Apparent magnitude (V): 13.42

Characteristics
- Type: E0
- Size: ~67,000 ly (20.55 kpc) (estimated)
- Apparent size (V): 1.5 x 1.4

Other designations
- ESO 323-16, CCC 204, MCG -7-27-2, PGC 43591

NGC 4729 is an elliptical galaxy located about 160 million light-years away in the constellation Centaurus. NGC 4729 was discovered by astronomer John Herschel on June 8, 1834 and is a member of the Centaurus Cluster.

== See also ==
- List of NGC objects (4001–5000)
