= NGC 4744 =

Barred lenticular galaxy in the constellation Centaurus

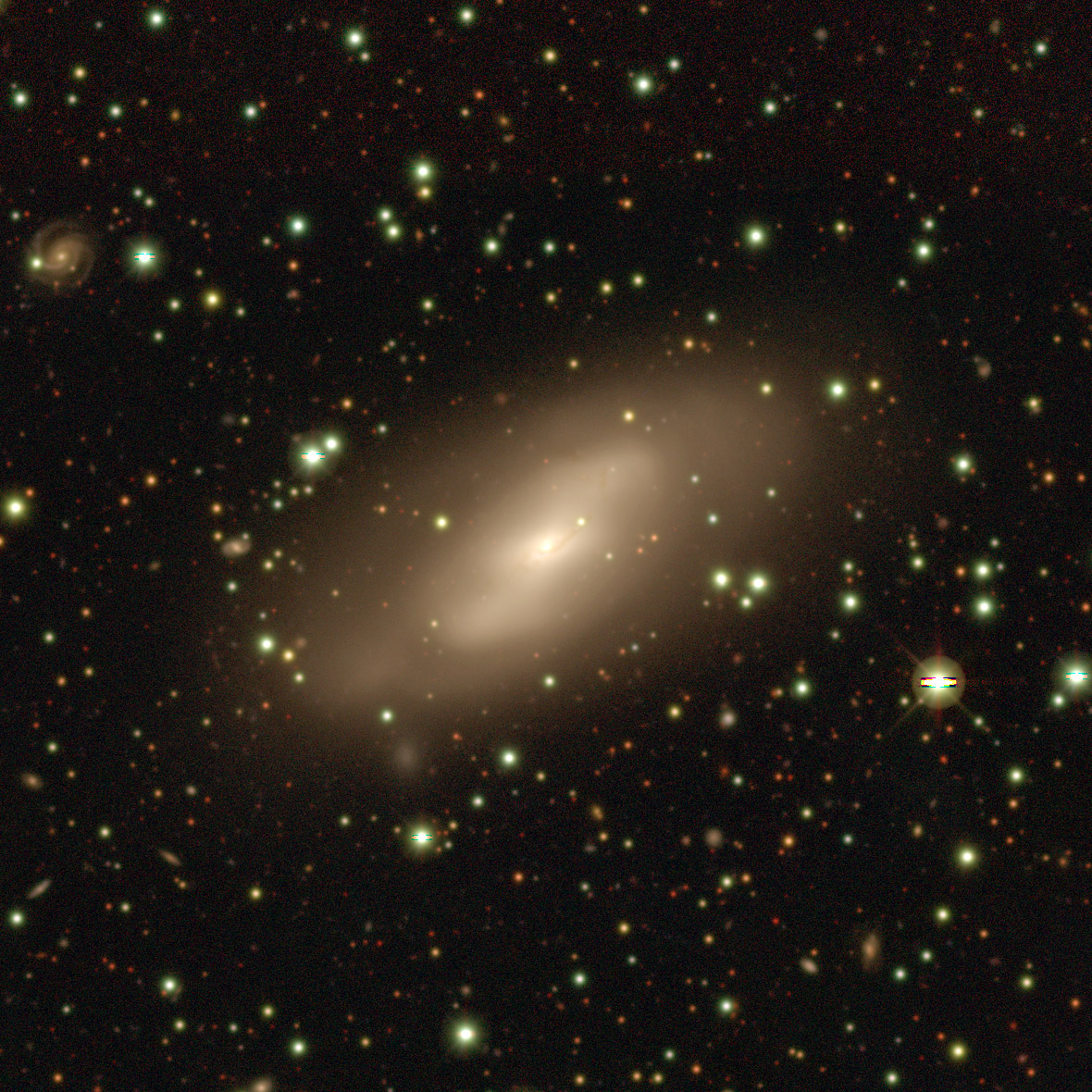
- legacy surveys image of NGC 4744.

Observation data (J2000 epoch)
- Constellation: Centaurus
- Right ascension: 12^{h} 52^{m} 19.6^{s}
- Declination: −41° 03′ 36″
- Redshift: 0.011201
- Heliocentric radial velocity: 3358 km/s
- Distance: 162 Mly (49.7 Mpc)
- Group or cluster: Centaurus Cluster
- Apparent magnitude (V): 13.77

Characteristics
- Type: SB0/a(s)
- Size: ~145,400 ly (44.59 kpc) (estimated)
- Apparent size (V): 2.1 x 1.0

Other designations
- ESO 323-22, CCC 227, IRAS 12495-4047, MCG -7-27-6, PGC 43661

NGC 4744 is a barred lenticular galaxy located about 160 million light-years away in the constellation Centaurus. NGC 4744 was discovered by astronomer John Herschel on June 8, 1834. It is a member of the Centaurus Cluster.

== See also ==
- List of NGC objects (4001–5000)
- NGC 4340
