= NGC 4706 =

Galaxy in the constellation Centaurus

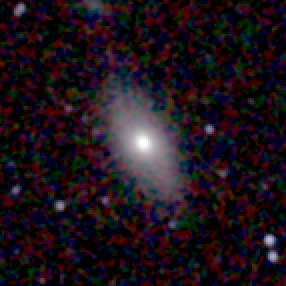
- 2MASS image of NGC 4706.

Observation data (J2000 epoch)
- Constellation: Centaurus
- Right ascension: 12^{h} 49^{m} 54.1^{s}
- Declination: −41° 16′ 46″
- Redshift: 0.012882
- Heliocentric radial velocity: 3862 km/s
- Distance: 157 Mly (48.2 Mpc)
- Group or cluster: Centaurus Cluster
- Apparent magnitude (V): 13.93

Characteristics
- Type: SAB(s)0^0
- Size: ~86,700 ly (26.57 kpc) (estimated)
- Apparent size (V): 1.4 x 0.6

Other designations
- ESO 323-1, CCC 122, MCG -7-26-55, PGC 43411

NGC 4706 is a lenticular galaxy located about 157 million light-years away in the constellation Centaurus. It was discovered by astronomer John Herschel on June 5, 1834. NGC 4706 is a member of the Centaurus Cluster.

== See also ==
- List of NGC objects (4001–5000)
