= NGC 4730 =

Lenticular galaxy in the constellation Centaurus

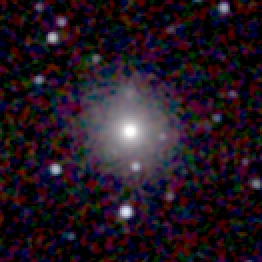
- 2MASS image of NGC 4730.

Observation data (J2000 epoch)
- Constellation: Centaurus
- Right ascension: 12^{h} 52^{m} 00.5l^{s}
- Declination: −41° 08′ 50″
- Redshift: 0.006981
- Heliocentric radial velocity: 2093 km/s
- Distance: 163 Mly (50.1 Mpc)
- Group or cluster: Centaurus Cluster
- Apparent magnitude (V): 13.87

Characteristics
- Type: SA0^-(r)
- Size: ~71,700 ly (21.97 kpc) (estimated)
- Apparent size (V): 1.2 x 1.0

Other designations
- ESO 323-17, CCC 211, MCG -7-27-3, PGC 43611

NGC 4730 is a lenticular galaxy located about 160 million light-years away in the constellation Centaurus. NGC 4730 was discovered by astronomer John Herschel on June 8, 1834. NGC 4730 is a member of the Centaurus Cluster.

NGC 4730 is considered to be part of a galaxy group known as NGC 4751 Group or LGG 309. It has at least NGC 4751, NGC 4730, ESO 322-101, ESO 323-33, PGC 43383, PGC 43402, PGC 43553, PGC 43722.

== See also ==
- List of NGC objects (4001–5000)
