= NGC 3052 =

Galaxy in the constellation Hydra

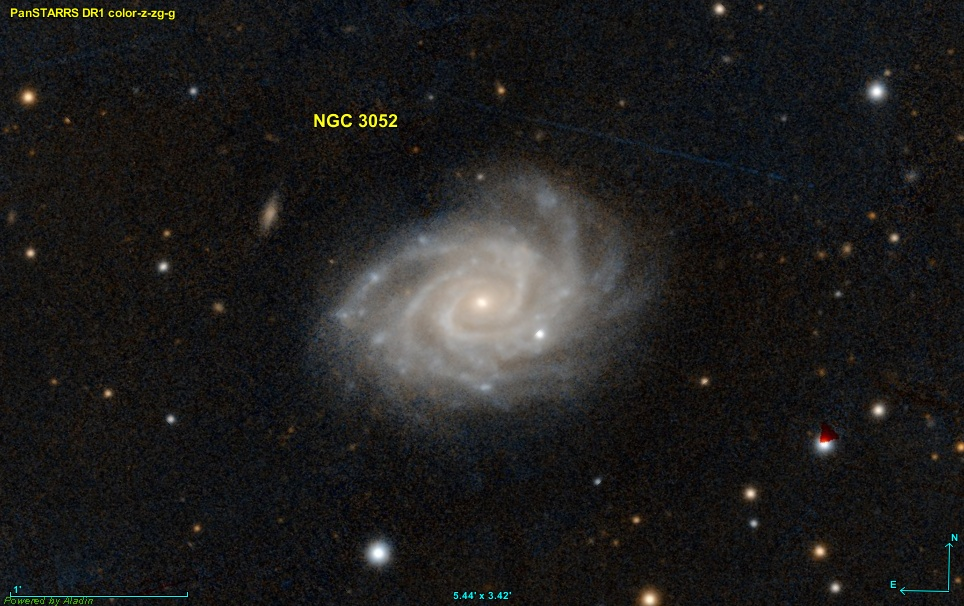
- NGC 3052 imaged by Pan-STARRS

Observation data (J2000 epoch)
- Constellation: Hydra
- Right ascension: 09^{h} 54^{m} 27.9697^{s}
- Declination: −18° 38′ 19.526″
- Redshift: 0.012602
- Heliocentric radial velocity: 3778 ± 2 km/s
- Distance: 198.3 ± 13.9 Mly (60.79 ± 4.27 Mpc)
- Group or cluster: NGC 3091 Group (LGG 186)
- Apparent magnitude (V): 12.2

Characteristics
- Type: SAB(r)c?
- Size: ~113,100 ly (34.67 kpc) (estimated)
- Apparent size (V): 2.1′ × 1.3′

Other designations
- IRAS 09521-1824, 2MASX J09542791-1838202, MCG -03-25-030, PGC 28570, ESO 566- G 026

NGC 3052 is an intermediate spiral galaxy in the constellation of Hydra. Its velocity concerning the cosmic microwave background is 4122 ± 24 km/s, which corresponds to a Hubble distance of 60.79 ± 4.27 Mpc (~198 million light-years). However, 19 nonredshift measurements give a much closer distance of 42.563 ± 6.434 Mpc (139 million light-years). The galaxy was discovered by German-British astronomer William Herschel on 7 February 1785.

The SIMBAD database lists NGC 3052 as a Seyfert I Galaxy, i.e. it has a quasar-like nuclei with very high surface brightnesses whose spectra reveal strong, high-ionisation emission lines, but unlike quasars, the host galaxy is clearly detectable.

One supernova has been observed in NGC 3052: SN 2024chx (Type II, mag. 18.2315) was discovered by the Zwicky Transient Facility on 12 February 2024.

== NGC 3091 Group ==
The galaxy NGC 3052 is part of the NGC 3091 group (also known as LGG 186), which includes at least 5 other galaxies: NGC 3091, NGC 3124, PGC 28926, MCG -3-26-6, and ESO 566–19.

== See also ==
- List of NGC objects (3001–4000)
