= NGC 4743 =

Galaxy in the constellation Centaurus

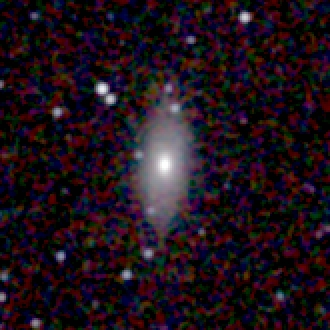
- 2MASS image of NGC 4743.

Observation data (J2000 epoch)
- Constellation: Centaurus
- Right ascension: 12^{h} 52^{m} 16.0^{s}
- Declination: −41° 23′ 26″
- Redshift: 0.009954
- Heliocentric radial velocity: 2984 km/s
- Distance: 145 Mly (44.6 Mpc)
- Group or cluster: Centaurus Cluster
- Apparent magnitude (V): 13.97

Characteristics
- Type: SA0^+
- Size: ~70,500 ly (21.62 kpc) (estimated)
- Apparent size (V): 1.3 x 0.5

Other designations
- ESO 323-21, CCC 226, MCG -7-27-5, PGC 43653

NGC 4743 is a lenticular galaxy located about 145 million light-years away in the constellation Centaurus. NGC 4743 was discovered by astronomer John Herschel on June 8, 1834. It is a member of the Centaurus Cluster.

== See also ==
- List of NGC objects
- List of NGC objects (4001–5000)
- NGC 4683
