= NGC 4507 =

Galaxy in the Constellation of Centaurus

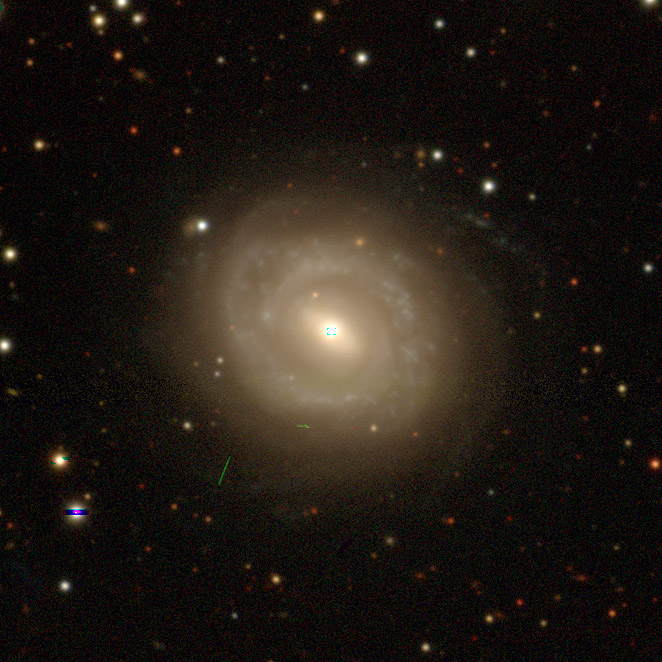

Observation data (J2000.0 epoch)
- Constellation: Centaurus
- Right ascension: 12^{h} 35^{m} 36,6^{s}
- Declination: −39° 54′ 33″
- Redshift: 0.011801
- Heliocentric radial velocity: 3538 ± 9
- Distance: 162 million LY
- Apparent magnitude (V): 12.1

Characteristics
- Type: SBb
- Apparent size (V): 1.60 x 1.3

NGC 4507 is a barred spiral galaxy in the constellation Centaurus. It was first discovered by astronomer John Herschel in 1834. It is classified as a type SBb galaxy. The galaxy's radial velocity, relative to the cosmic microwave background is measured at around 3831 ± 22 km/s, corresponding to a Hubble distance of around 56.50 ± 3.97 MPC. It is also classified as a Type 2 Seyfert galaxy.
