= NGC 4340 =

Galaxy in the constellation Coma Berenices

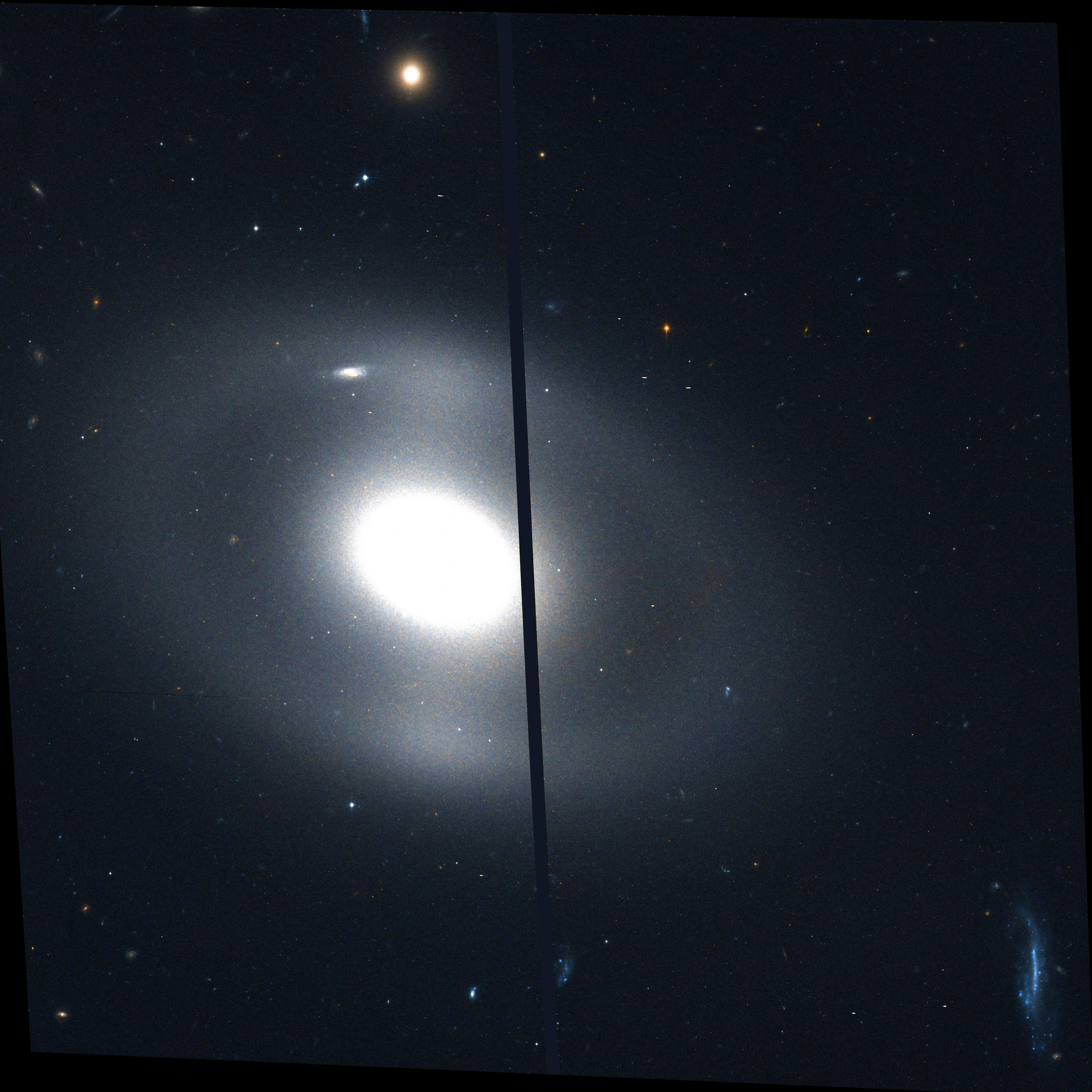
- NGC 4340 imaged by the Hubble Space Telescope

Observation data (J2000 epoch)
- Constellation: Coma Berenices
- Right ascension: 12^{h} 23^{m} 35.3^{s}
- Declination: 16° 43′ 20″
- Redshift: 0.003112/933 km/s
- Distance: 56,070,000 ly
- Group or cluster: Virgo Cluster
- Apparent magnitude (V): 12.10

Characteristics
- Type: SB0^+(r)
- Size: ~ 53,400 ly
- Apparent size (V): 3.5 x 2.8

Other designations
- CGCG 99-36, MCG 3-32-21, PGC 40245, UGC 7467, VCC 654

NGC 4340 is a double-barred lenticular galaxy located about 55 million light-years away in the constellation of Coma Berenices. NGC 4340 was discovered by astronomer William Herschel on March 21, 1784. NGC 4340 is a member of the Virgo Cluster. NGC 4340 is generally thought to be in a pair with the galaxy NGC 4350.

== Physical characteristics ==
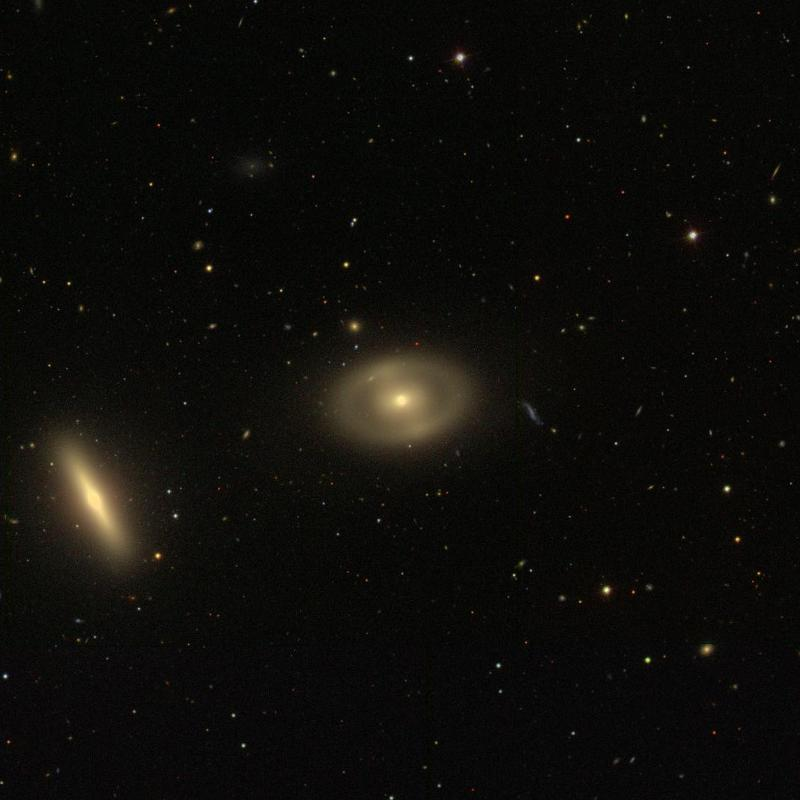
Image of the galaxies NGC 4340 (center) and NGC 4350 (bottom left corner)

NGC 4340 has a small inner bar embedded in a luminous stellar nuclear ring. Even though the ring is luminous, there are no star-forming regions. Instead, the ring is made of mostly old stars in a gas-poor environment. The color of the ring is the same as the color of the surrounding bulge suggesting that it is probably an old, “fossil” remnant of an earlier episode of star-formation. Crossing the inner ring, there is a larger primary bar with ansae at the ends. Careful inspection shows that the two bars are slightly misaligned, which suggests they may be independently rotating. The larger primary bar connects to another ring that surrounds the central regions of the galaxy.

== Supernova ==
One supernova has been observed in NGC 4340: SN 1977A (type unknown, mag. 16.2) was discovered by Piotr Grigor'evich Kulikovsky on 27 January 1977.

== See also ==
- List of NGC objects (4001–5000)
