= NGC 4696 =

Elliptical galaxy in the constellation Centaurus

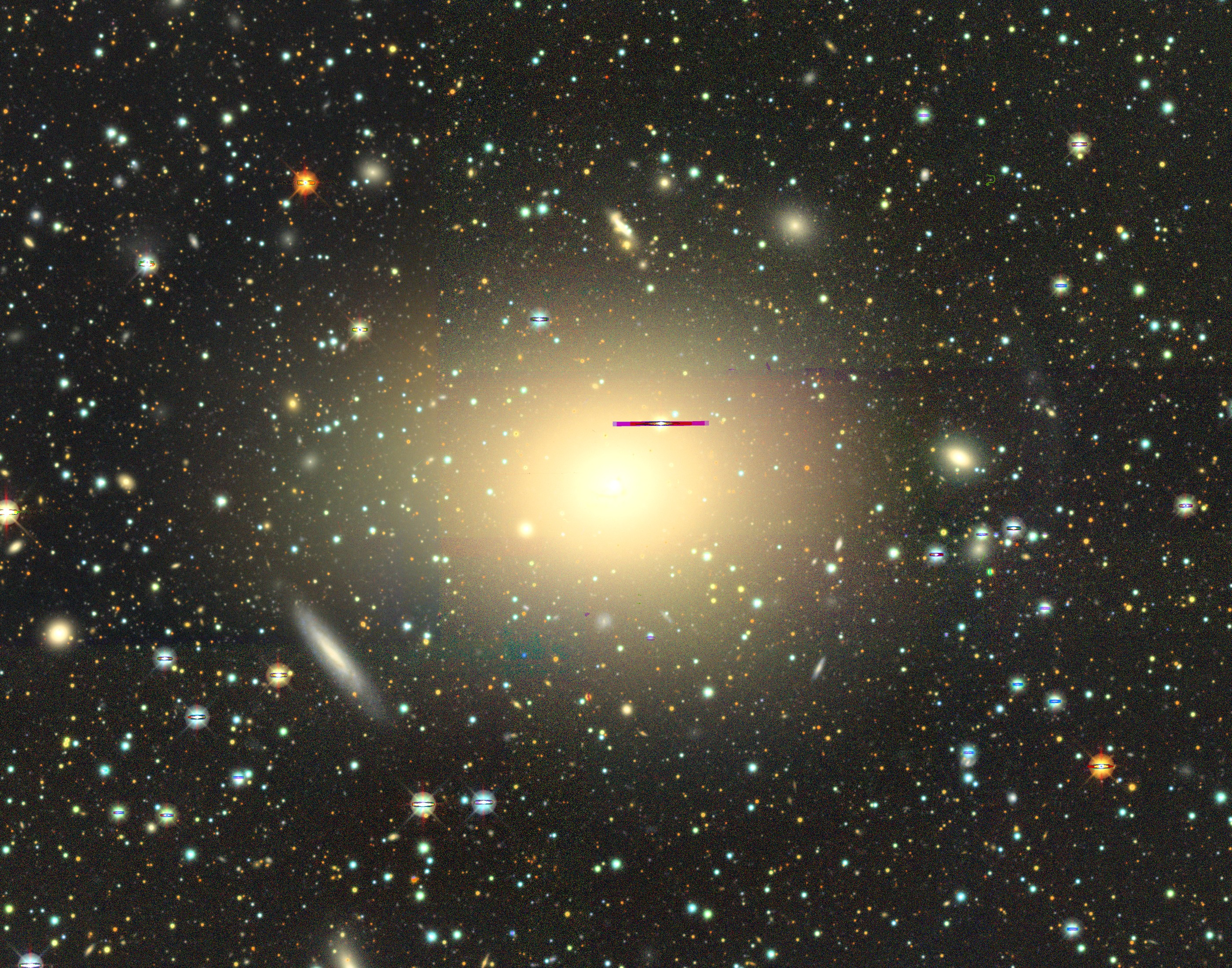
- NGC 4696 imaged by Legacy Surveys

Observation data (J2000 epoch)
- Constellation: Centaurus
- Right ascension: 12^{h} 48^{m} 49.2614^{s}
- Declination: −41° 18′ 39.115″
- Redshift: 0.009904±0.0000400
- Heliocentric radial velocity: 2,969±12 km/s
- Distance: 116 ± 9 Mly (35 ± 3 Mpc)
- Apparent magnitude (V): 11.39

Characteristics
- Type: E1 pec
- Apparent size (V): 4.5′ × 3.2′

Other designations
- ESO 322- G 091, 2MASX J12484927-4118399, MCG -07-26-051, PGC 43296

NGC 4696 is an elliptical galaxy in the constellation Centaurus. Its velocity with respect to the cosmic microwave background is 3,251±23 km/s, which corresponds to a Hubble distance of 156.4 ± 11.0 Mly (47.95 ± 3.38 Mpc). However, 25 non-redshift measurements give a much closer mean distance of 122.63 ± 3.90 Mly (37.600 ± 1.196 Mpc). It was discovered by British astronomer James Dunlop on 7 May 1826.

NGC 4696 is the brightest galaxy in the Centaurus Cluster, a large, rich cluster of galaxies in the constellation of the same name. The galaxy is surrounded by many dwarf elliptical galaxies also located within the cluster. There is believed to be a supermassive black hole at the center of the galaxy.

== Supernova ==
One supernova has been observed in NGC 4696:

- SN 2017ejb (Type Ia, mag. 17.2078) was discovered by the Distance Less Than 40 Mpc Survey (DLT40) on 28 May 2017.
