= Centaurus Cluster =

Galaxy cluster in the constellation Centaurus

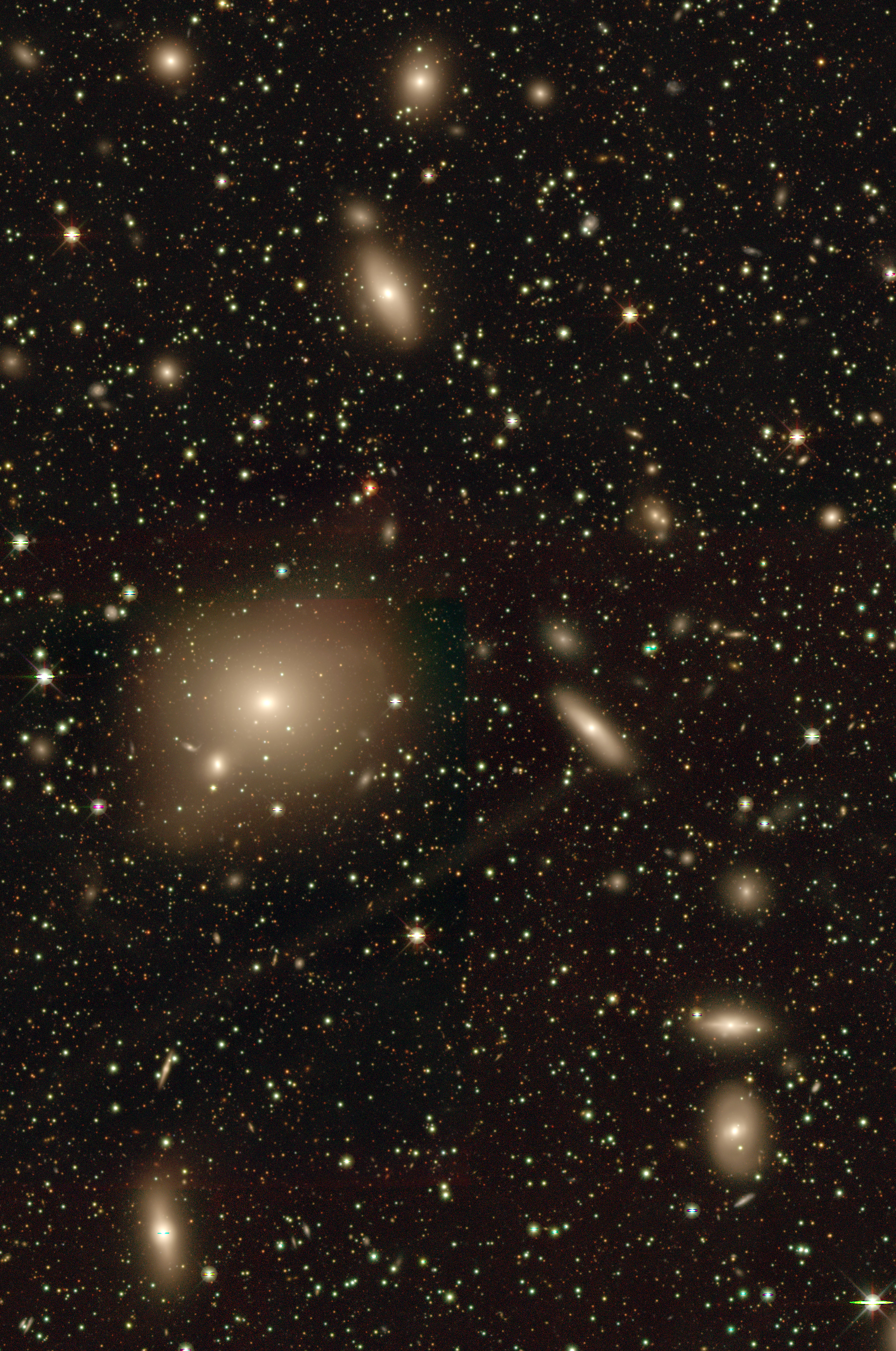
- Centaurus Cluster imaged by Legacy Surveys

Observation data (Epoch J2000)
- Constellation: Centaurus
- Right ascension: 12^{h} 48^{m} 51.8^{s}
- Declination: −41° 18′ 21″
- Brightest member: NGC 4696
- Number of galaxies: ~100
- Richness class: 0
- Bautz–Morgan classification: I–II
- Redshift: 0.01140 (3 418 km/s)
- Distance: 52.4 Mpc (170.9 Mly) h^{−1}_{0.705}
- X-ray flux: 15.7×10^{−11} erg s^{−1} cm^{−2} (0.5–2 keV)

Other designations
- Abell 3526

The Centaurus cluster (A3526) is a cluster of hundreds of galaxies, located approximately 170 million light-years away in the constellation Centaurus. The brightest member galaxy is the elliptical galaxy NGC 4696 (~11m). The Centaurus cluster shares its supercluster, the Hydra–Centaurus supercluster, with the IC 4329 cluster and the Hydra cluster.

The cluster consists of two different sub-groups of galaxies with different velocities. Cen 30 is the main subgroup containing NGC 4696. Cen 45 which is centered on NGC 4709, is moving at 1500 km/s relative to Cen 30, and is believed to be merging with the main cluster.

== Gallery ==
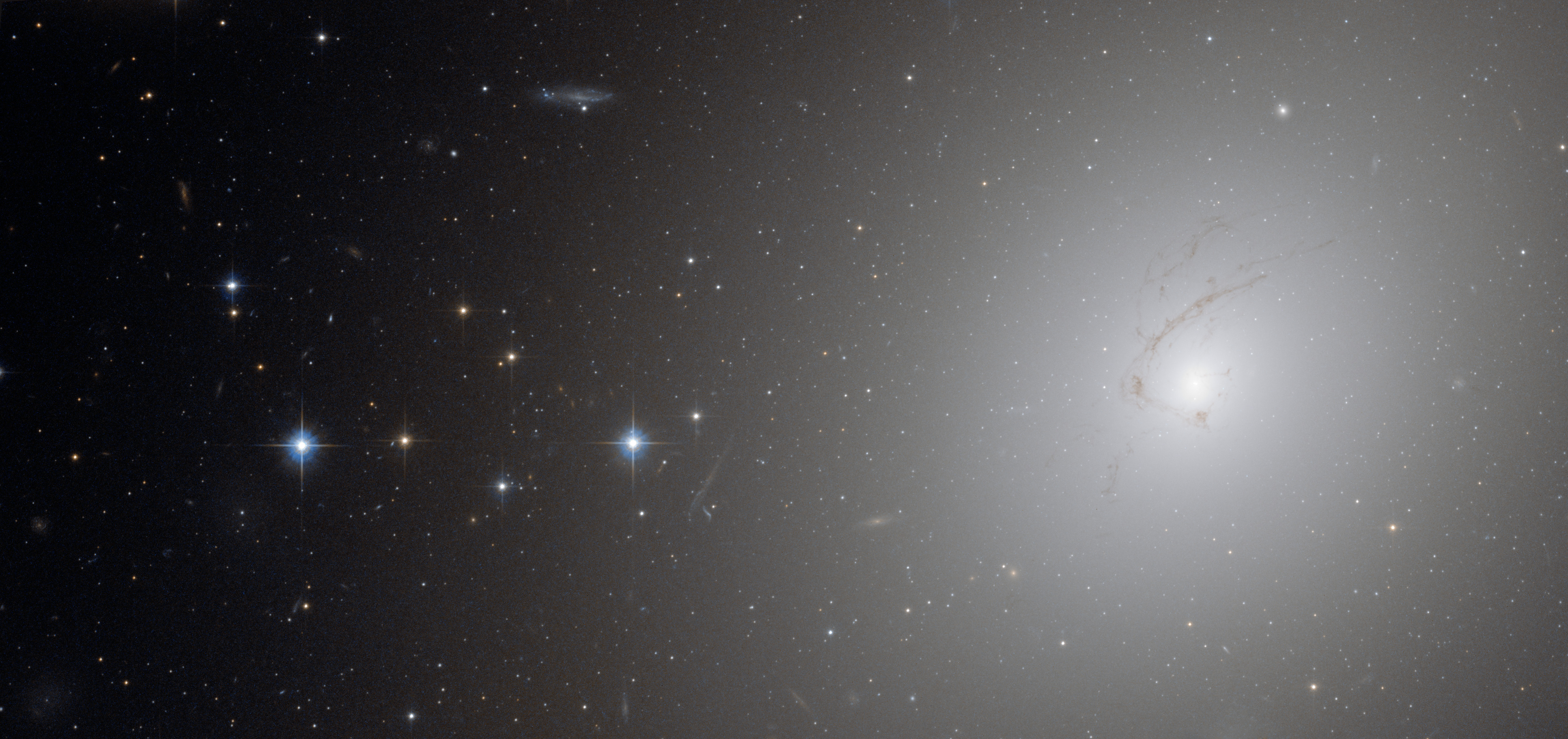
NGC 4696: a cosmic question mark

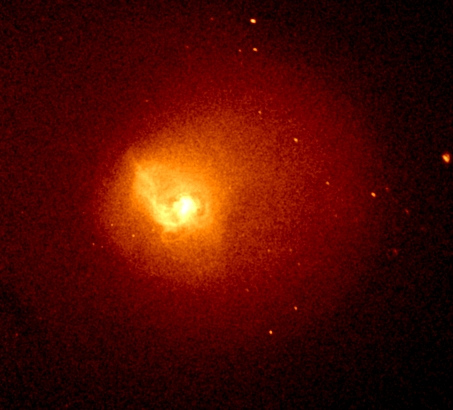
Chandra X-ray image showing the inner 6.7 arcminutes of the core of the Centaurus Cluster. This image shows the hot intracluster medium, at temperatures of a few tens of million kelvins.

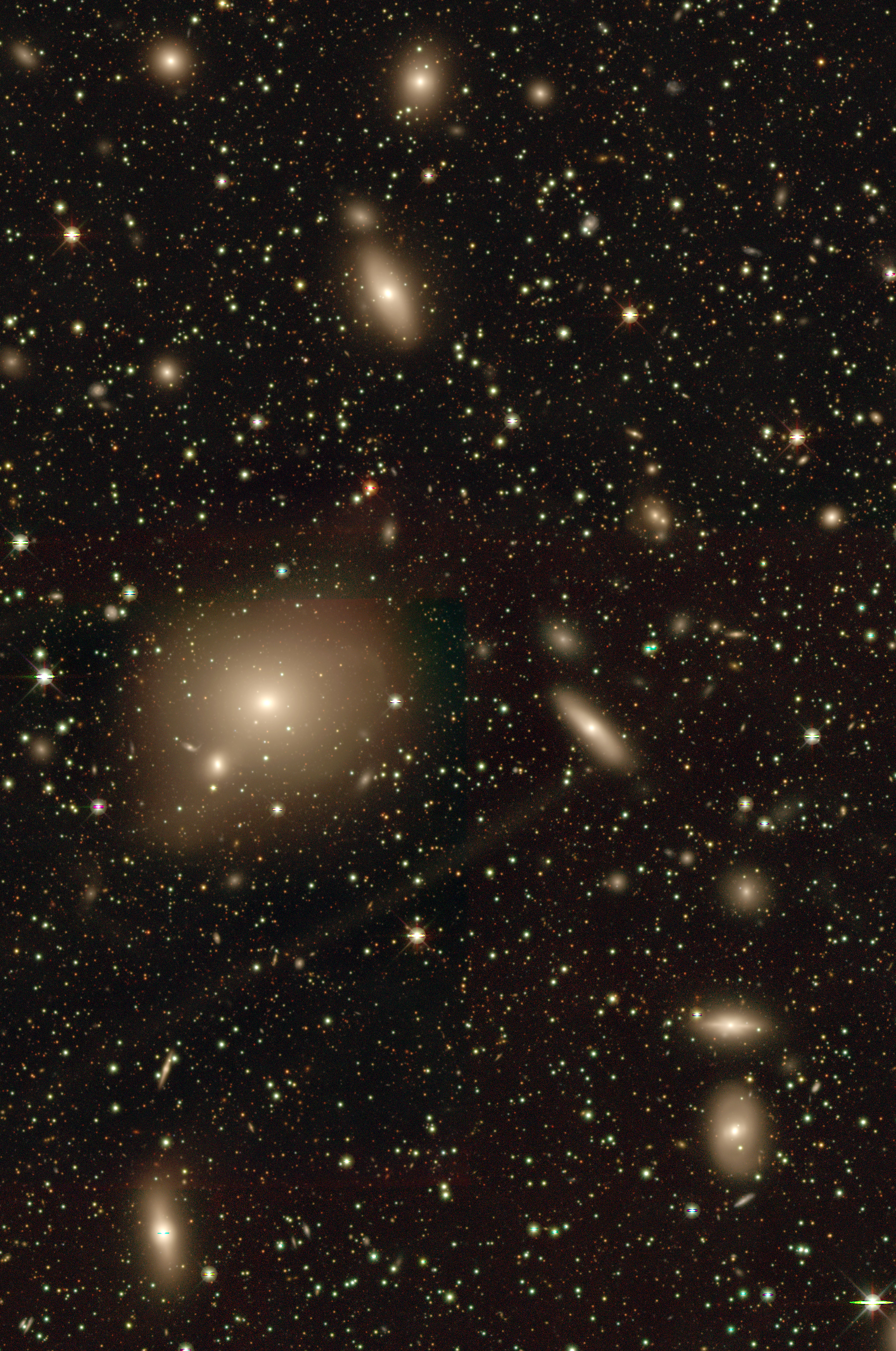
Region around NGC 4709 (large galaxy in the middle) in the western part of the Centaurus Cluster.

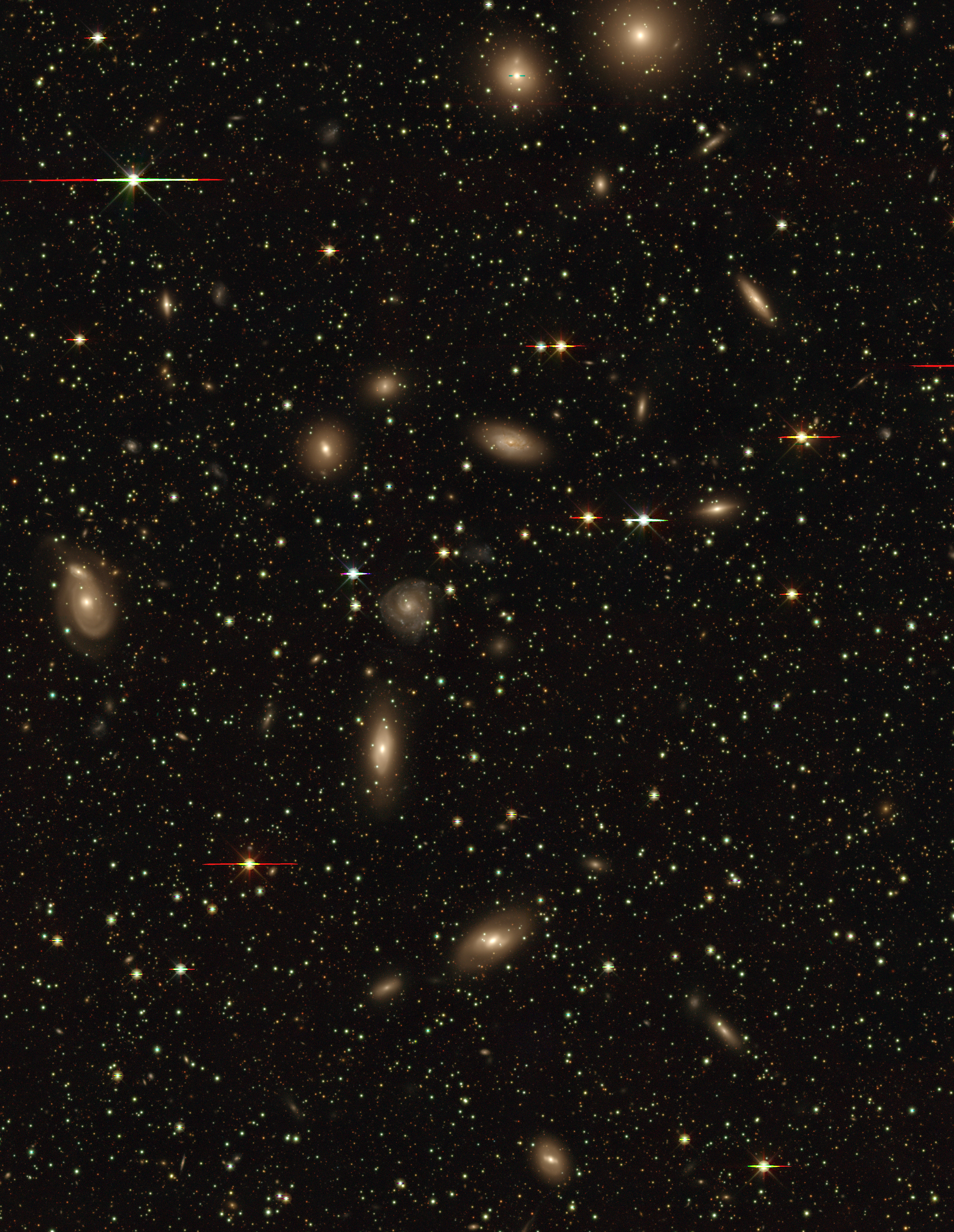
East part of the Centaurus Cluster with NGC 4729, NGC 4730 and NGC 4743.

== See also ==
- Abell catalogue
- List of Abell clusters
- X-ray astronomy
