= List of Abell clusters =

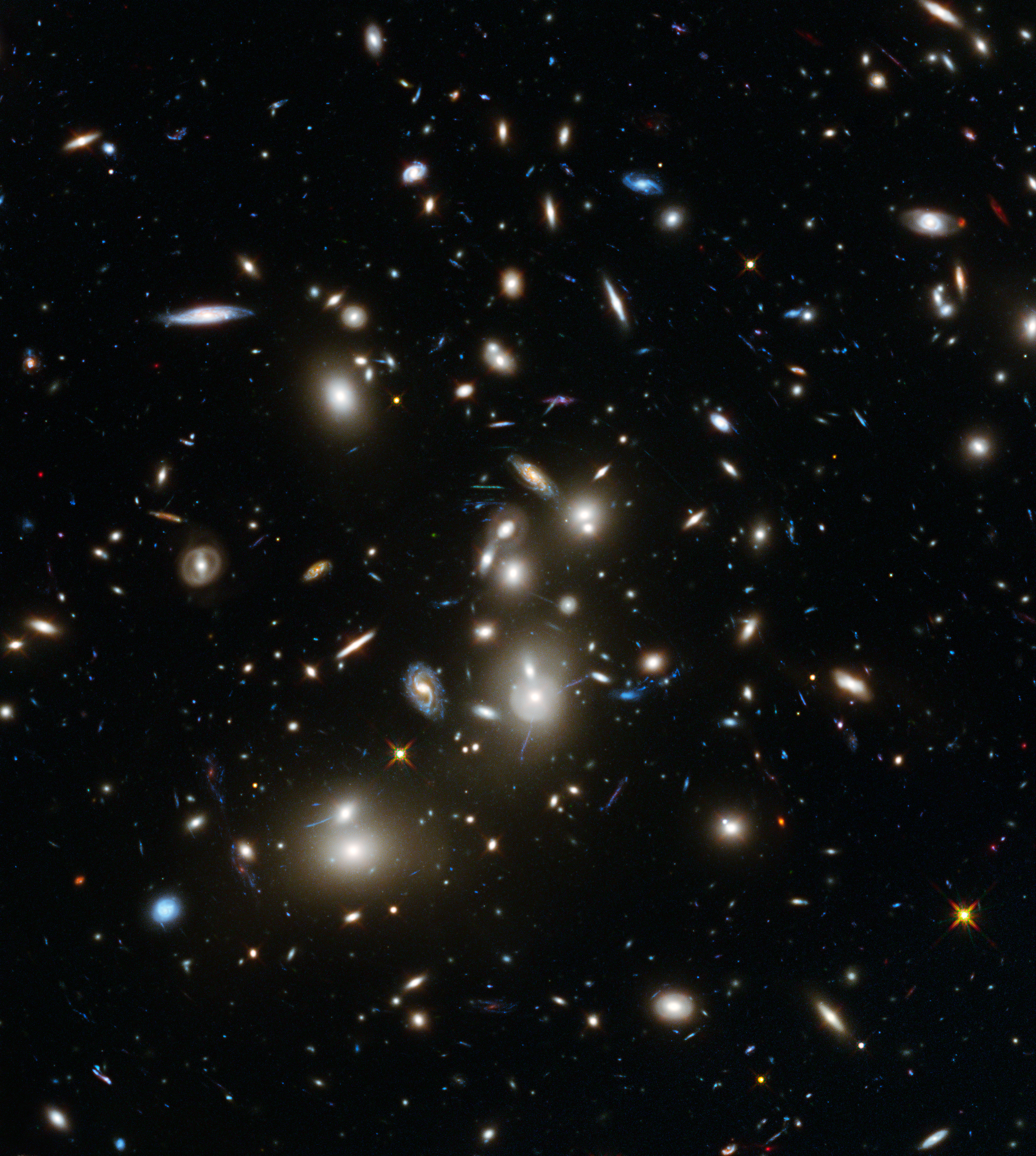
Abell 2744 galaxy cluster – Hubble Frontier Fields view (7 January 2014).

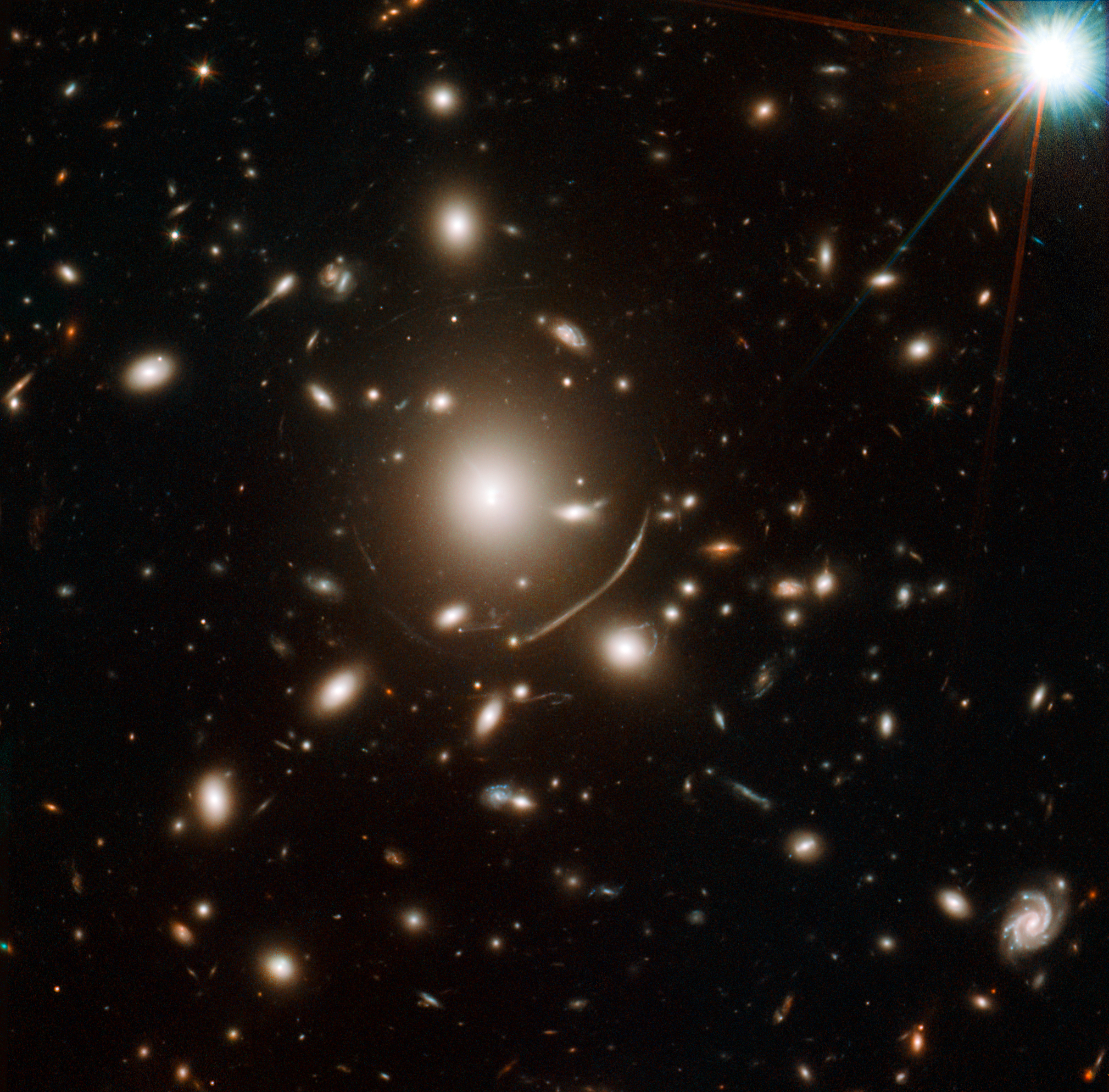
Abell 383, the giant cluster of elliptical galaxies in the centre of this image, contains so great a mass of dark matter that its gravity bends the light from a background object into an arc, a phenomenon known as strong gravitational lensing.

The Abell catalogue is a catalogue of approximately 4,000 galaxy clusters with at least 30 members, almost complete to a redshift of z = 0.2. It was originally compiled by the American astronomer George O. Abell in 1958 using plates from POSS, and extended to the southern hemisphere by Abell, Corwin and Olowin in 1987. The name "Abell" is also commonly used as a designation for objects he compiled in a catalogue of 86 planetary nebulae in 1966. The proper designation for the galaxy clusters is ACO, as in "ACO 13", while the planetary-nebula designation is the single letter A, as in "A 39".

== 1–1999 ==
| ACO catalog number | Other names | Member of | Constellation | Right ascension (J2000) | Declination (J2000) | Abell richness class | Bautz–Morgan type | Notes |
|---|---|---|---|---|---|---|---|---|
| 13 | | Aquarius Supercluster | | 00^{h} 13^{m} 38.5^{s} | −19° 30′ 19″ | 2 | II | ACO 13 is not to be confused with Abell 13, a planetary nebula |
| 68 | | | | 00^{h} 37^{m} 05.3^{s} | +09° 09′ 11.00″ | 1 | I | |
| 85 | | Pisces–Cetus Supercluster Complex | | 00^{h} 41^{m} 37.8^{s} | −09° 20′ 33″ | 1 | I | |
| 133 | | Pisces–Cetus Supercluster Complex | Cetus | 01^{h} 02^{m} 39.0^{s} | −21° 57′ 15″ | 0 | I | |
| 209 | | | Cetus | 01^{h} 31^{m} 53^{s} | −13° 36′ 34″ | 3 | II-III | |
| 222 | | SCL 13 | Cetus | 01^{h} 37^{m} 29.2^{s} | −12° 59′ 10″ | 3 | II-III | |
| 223 | | | Cetus | 01^{h} 37^{m} 56.4^{s} | −12° 48′ 01″ | 3 | III | |
| 226 | | | | 01^{h} 38^{m} 58.7^{s} | −10° 14′ 47″ | 1 | II | |
| 262 | | Perseus–Pisces Supercluster | Between Andromeda and Triangulum | 01^{h} 52^{m} 50.4^{s} | +36° 08′ 46″ | 0 | III | |
| 263 | | | | 01^{h} 53^{m} 21.7^{s} | +37° 33′ 45″ | 1 | | |
| 267 | | SCL 16 | | 01^{h} 52^{m} 52.2^{s} | +01° 02′ 46″ | | | |
| 370 | | | Cetus | 02^{h} 39^{m} 50.5^{s} | −01° 35′ 08″ | 0 | II-III | Exhibits gravitational lensing. The most distant Abell object, at a redshift of 0.375. |
| 383 | | | Eridanus | 02^{h} 48^{m} 07.0^{s} | −03° 29′ 32″ | 2 | II-III | |
| 400 | | SCL 25 | Cetus | 02^{h} 57^{m} 38.6^{s} | +06° 02′ 00″ | 1 | II-III | |
| 401 | | SCL 45 | Aries | 02^{h} 58^{m} 57.0^{s} | +13° 34′ 56″ | 2 | I | |
| 402 | | Fornax-Eridanus Supercluster | | 02^{h} 57^{m} 41.3280^{s} | −22° 09′ 14.4″ | | | |
| 426 | Perseus Cluster | Perseus–Pisces Supercluster | Perseus | 03^{h} 18^{m} 36.4^{s} | +41° 30′ 54″ | 2 | II-III | |
| 478 | | | Taurus | 04^{h} 13^{m} 20.7^{s} | +10° 28′ 35″ | 2 | | |
| 514 | | | | 04^{h} 47^{m} 40.1^{s} | −20° 25′ 44″ | 1 | II-III | |
| 520 | Train Wreck Cluster | | Orion | 04^{h} 54^{m} 19.0^{s} | +02° 56′ 49″ | 3 | III | |
| 521 | | | Eridanus | 04^{h} 54^{m} 09.13^{s} | −10° 14′ 25.1″ | | | |
| 553 | | | | 06^{h} 12^{m} 37.5^{s} | +48° 36′ 13″ | 0 | II | |
| 569 | | SCL 32 | Lynx | 07^{h} 09^{m} 10.4^{s} | +48° 37′ 10″ | 0 | II | |
| 576 | | SCL 31 | Lynx | 07^{h} 21^{m} 24.2^{s} | +55° 44′ 20″ | 1 | III | |
| 646 | | | | 08^{h} 22^{m} 09.54^{s} | +47° 05′ 53.196″ | | | |
| 653 | | | Hydra | 08^{h} 21^{m} 47.0^{s} | +01° 13′ 23″ | 1 | | |
| 665 | | | Ursa Major | 08^{h} 30^{m} 45.2^{s} | +65° 52′ 55″ | 5 | III | The only Abell cluster of richness class 5. |
| 671 | | | Cancer | 08^{h} 28^{m} 29.3^{s} | +03° 25′ 01″ | 0 | II-III | |
| 689 | | | Cancer | 08^{h} 37^{m} 29.7^{s} | +14° 59′ 29″ | 0 | | |
| 697 | | | | 08^{h} 42^{m} 56.69^{s} | +36° 21′ 45″ | | | |
| 754 | | | Hydra | 09^{h} 08^{m} 50.1^{s} | −09° 38′ 12″ | 2 | I-II | |
| 779 | | | Lynx | 09^{h} 19^{m} 9^{s} | +33° 46′ | | | |
| 901 | | | | 09^{h} 56^{m} 09.7^{s} | −09° 56′ 17″ | 1 | | |
| 907 | | | Hydra | 09^{h} 58^{m} 21.2^{s} | −11° 03′ 22″ | 1 | | |
| 955 | | | | 10^{h} 12^{m} 56.0^{s} | −24° 26′ 53″ | 1 | | |
| 966 | | | | 10^{h} 16^{m} 13.8^{s} | −25° 22′ 59″ | 1 | III | |
| 1060 | Hydra Cluster | | Hydra | 10^{h} 36^{m} 51.3^{s} | −27° 31′ 35″ | 1 | III | |
| 1142 | | Leo Supercluster | | 11^{h} 00^{m} 51.4^{s} | +10° 31′ 46″ | | | |
| 1146 | | | Crater | 11^{h} 01^{m} 20.6^{s} | −22° 43′ 08″ | 4 | I | |
| 1185 | | Leo Supercluster | Ursa Major | 11^{h} 10^{m} 31.4^{s} | +28° 43′ 39″ | 1 | II | |
| 1201 | | | | 11^{h} 12^{m} 54.8900^{s} | +13° 26′ 41.280″ | | | |
| 1367 | Leo Cluster | | Leo | 11^{h} 44^{m} 29.5^{s} | +19° 50′ 21″ | 2 | II-III | |
| 1413 | | | Between Leo and Coma Berenices | 11^{h} 55^{m} 18.9^{s} | +23° 24′ 31″ | 3 | I | Contains an extremely large cD galaxy. |
| 1631 | | Shapley Supercluster | Corvus | 12^{h} 52^{m} 49.8^{s} | −15° 26′ 17″ | 0 | I | |
| 1656 | Coma Cluster | | Coma Berenices | 12^{h} 59^{m} 48.7^{s} | +27° 58′ 50″ | 2 | II | |
| 1689 | | | Virgo | 13^{h} 11^{m} 29.5^{s} | −01° 20′ 17″ | 4 | II-III | One of the biggest and most massive galaxy clusters known; exhibits gravitational lensing. |
| 1795 | | Boötes Supercluster | Boötes | 13^{h} 49^{m} 00.5^{s} | +26° 35′ 07″ | 2 | I | |
| 1835 | | | Virgo | 14^{h} 01^{m} 02.0^{s} | +02° 51′ 32″ | 0 | | Behind it lies a candidate for the furthest known galaxy, "Galaxy Abell 1835 IR1916", seen through gravitational lensing. |
| 1914 | | | Boötes | 14^{h} 26^{m} 03.0^{s} | +37° 49′ 32″ | 2 | II | |
| 1991 | | | Boötes | 14^{h} 54^{m} 30.2^{s} | +18° 37′ 51″ | 1 | I | |

== 2000–4076 ==
| ACO catalog number | Other names | Member of | Constellation | Right ascension (J2000) | Declination (J2000) | Abell richness class | Bautz–Morgan type | Notes |
|---|---|---|---|---|---|---|---|---|
| 2009 | | | | 15^{h} 00^{m} 19.5144^{s} | +21° 22′ 09.876″ | | | |
| 2029 | | SCL 154 | Virgo | 15^{h} 10^{m} 56.0^{s} | +05° 44′ 41″ | 2 | I | Near the Serpens–Virgo border. |
| 2052 | | | | 15^{h} 16^{m} 45.5^{s} | +07° 00′ 01″ | 0 | I-II | |
| 2061 | | Corona Borealis Supercluster | Corona Borealis | 15^{h} 21^{m} 15.3^{s} | +30° 39′ 17″ | 1 | III | |
| 2063 | | Hercules Superclusters | | 15^{h} 23^{m} 05.3^{s} | +08° 36′ 33″ | | | |
| 2065 | Corona Borealis Cluster | Corona Borealis Supercluster | Corona Borealis | 15^{h} 22^{m} 42.6^{s} | +27° 43′ 21″ | 2 | III | |
| 2067 | | Corona Borealis Supercluster | Corona Borealis | 15^{h} 23^{m} 14^{s} | +30° 54′ 23″ | 1 | III | |
| 2079 | | Corona Borealis Supercluster | Corona Borealis | 15^{h} 28^{m} 04.7^{s} | +28° 52′ 40″ | | | |
| 2089 | | Corona Borealis Supercluster | Corona Borealis | 15^{h} 32^{m} 41.3^{s} | +28° 00′ 56″ | | | |
| 2092 | | Corona Borealis Supercluster | Corona Borealis | 15^{h} 33^{m} 17.0^{s} | +31° 08′ 55″ | | | |
| 2107 | | Hercules Superclusters | | 15^{h} 39^{m} 39.0^{s} | +21° 46′ 58″ | | | |
| 2124 | | Corona Borealis Supercluster | Corona Borealis | 15^{h} 44^{m} 59^{s} | +36° 04′ | 1 | I | |
| 2142 | | | Corona Borealis | 15^{h} 58^{m} 16.1^{s} | +27° 13′ 29″ | 2 | II | A merger of two huge galaxy clusters. |
| 2147 | | Hercules Superclusters | Serpens | 16^{h} 02^{m} 17.2^{s} | +15° 53′ 43″ | 1 | III | |
| 2151 | Hercules Cluster | Hercules Superclusters | Hercules | 16^{h} 05^{m} 15.0^{s} | +17° 44′ 55″ | 2 | III | Major component of the Hercules Superclusters. |
| 2152 | | Hercules Superclusters | Hercules | 16^{h} 05^{m} 22.4^{s} | +16° 26′ 55″ | 1 | III | The smaller part of the Hercules supercluster, L_{x} ≤ 3 × 10^{44} ergs/s. |
| 2162 | | Hercules Superclusters | Corona Borealis | 16^{h} 12^{m} 30.0^{s} | +29° 32′ 23″ | | | |
| 2163 | | | Ophiuchus | 16^{h} 15^{m} 34.1^{s} | −06° 07′ 26″ | 2 | | |
| 2199 | | Hercules Superclusters | Hercules | 16^{h} 28^{m} 38.5^{s} | +39° 33′ 06″ | 2 | I | |
| 2200 | | SCL 164 | Hercules | 16^{h} 29^{m} 24.7^{s} | +28° 10′ 30″ | 0 | | |
| 2218 | | | Draco | 16^{h} 35^{m} 54.0^{s} | +66° 13′ 00″ | 4 | II | Exhibits gravitational lensing. |
| 2244 | | | Hercules | 17^{h} 02^{m} 42.8600^{s} | +34° 03′ 42.840″ | | | |
| 2255 | | | Draco | 17^{h} 12^{m} 31.0^{s} | +64° 05′ 33.00″ | | | Contains Beaver galaxy, Goldfish galaxy and Original TRG |
| 2256 | | SCL 168 | Ursa Minor | 17^{h} 03^{m} 43.5^{s} | +78° 43′ 03″ | 2 | II-III | |
| 2261 | | | Hercules | 17^{h} 22^{m} 28.34^{s} | +32° 09′ 12.67″ | | I | Part of the Cluster Lensing and Supernova survey with Hubble (CLASH) survey. |
| 2280 | | | Draco | 17^{h} 43^{m} 29.6826^{s} | +21° 22′ 09.876″ | | | |
| 2319 | | | Cygnus | 19^{h} 20^{m} 45.3^{s} | +43° 57′ 43″ | 1 | II-III | Very close to, and possibly extending into, Lyra. |
| 2384 | | | Capricornus | 21^{h} 52^{m} 18.9^{s} | −19° 34′ 42″ | 1 | II-III | |
| 2390 | | | Pegasus | 21^{h} 53^{m} 34.6^{s} | +17° 40′ 11″ | 1 | | |
| 2440 | | SCL 196 | | 22^{h} 23^{m} 52.6^{s} | −01° 35′ 47″ | 0 | II | |
| 2515 | | | Pegasus | 23h 00m 40.9s | +31° 09' 52" | 3 | II | |
| 2589 | | | Pegasus | 23^{h} 24^{m} 00.5^{s} | +16° 49′ 29″ | 0 | I | |
| 2597 | | | Aquarius | 23^{h} 25^{m} 19.7^{s} | −12° 07′ 27.07″ | | | |
| 2666 | | SCL 215 | | 23^{h} 50^{m} 56.2^{s} | +27° 08′ 41″ | 0 | I | |
| 2667 | | | Sculptor | 23^{h} 51^{m} 47.1^{s} | −26° 00′ 18″ | 3 | I | Exhibits strong gravitational lensing. |
| 2744 | Pandora's Cluster | | Sculptor | 00^{h} 14^{m} 19.5^{s} | −30° 23′ 19″ | 3 | III | It seems to have formed from four different clusters involved in a series of collisions over a period of some 350 million years. |
| 3128 | Shapley 20 Cluster | Horologium Supercluster | | 03^{h} 30^{m} 34.6^{s} | −52° 33′ 12″ | 3 | I-II | |
| 3158 | Shapley 17 Cluster | Horologium Supercluster | | 03^{h} 42^{m} 39.6^{s} | −53° 37′ 50″ | 2 | I-II | |
| 3192 | MCS/MACS J0358.8-2955 | Fornax-Eridanus Supercluster | Eridanus | | | | | Comprises such a huge amount of mass that the galaxy cluster noticeably curves spacetime around it, making it into a gravitational lens. Smaller galaxies behind the cluster appear distorted into long, warped arcs around the cluster’s edges. |
| 3266 | | Horologium Supercluster | Reticulum | 04^{h} 31^{m} 11.9^{s} | −61° 24′ 23″ | 2 | I-II | |
| 3341 | | SCL 67 | | 05^{h} 25^{m} 35.1^{s} | −31° 35′ 26″ | 2 | II | |
| 3363 | | SCL 241 | | 05^{h} 45^{m} 07.8^{s} | −47° 56′ 52″ | 3 | I | |
| 3411 | | | Hydra | 08^{h} 41^{m} 47.7^{s} | −17° 28′ 46″ | 1 | II | |
| 3412 | | | Hydra | 08^{h} 42^{m} 05^{s} | −17° 35′ 8″ | 1 | II-III | |
| 3526 | Centaurus Cluster | Hydra–Centaurus Supercluster | Centaurus | 12^{h} 48^{m} 51.8^{s} | −41° 18′ 21″ | 0 | I-II | |
| 3558 | Shapley 8 Cluster | Shapley Supercluster | | 13^{h} 27^{m} 54.8^{s} | −31° 29′ 32″ | 4 | I | |
| 3562 | | Shapley Supercluster | | 13^{h} 33^{m} 31.8^{s} | −31° 40′ 23″ | 2 | I | |
| 3565 | | Hydra–Centaurus Supercluster | | 13^{h} 36^{m} 39.9^{s} | −33° 58′ 17″ | 1 | I | |
| 3574 | | Hydra–Centaurus Supercluster | | 13^{h} 49^{m} 09.4^{s} | −30° 17′ 54″ | 0 | I | |
| 3581 | | Hydra–Centaurus Supercluster | | 14^{h} 07^{m} 27.5^{s} | −27° 01′ 15″ | 0 | I | |
| 3627 | Norma Cluster | | Norma | 16^{h} 15^{m} 32.8^{s} | −60° 54′ 30″ | 1 | I | |
| 3667 | | | Pavo | 20^{h} 12^{m} 31^{s} | −56° 49′ 55″ | 2 | I-II | 10^15 solar masses, bright X-ray source, paired radio relics, likely result of cluster merger |
| 3677 | | Microscopium Supercluster | Microscopium | 20^{h} 26^{m} 21^{s} | −33° 21′ 06″ | | | possible member of Microscopium Supercluster |
| 3693 | | Microscopium Supercluster | Microscopium | 20^{h} 34^{m} 22^{s} | −34° 29′ 40″ | | | possible member of Microscopium Supercluster |
| 3695 | | Microscopium Supercluster | Microscopium | 20^{h} 34^{m} 48^{s} | −35° 49′ 39″ | | | gravitationally bound to Abell 3696 |
| 3696 | | Microscopium Supercluster | Microscopium | 20^{h} 35^{m} 10^{s} | −34° 54′ 36″ | | | gravitationally bound to Abell 3695 |
| 3705 | | Microscopium Supercluster | Microscopium | 20^{h} 41^{m} 42^{s} | −35° 14′ 00″ | | | possible member of Microscopium Supercluster |
| 3854 | | | | 22^{h} 17^{m} 42.9^{s} | −35° 42′ 58″ | 3 | II | |
| 4059 | | | | 23^{h} 56^{m} 40.7^{s} | −34° 40′ 18″ | 1 | I | |

== Southern catalogue S1–S1174 ==
| ACO catalog number | Other names | Member of | Constellation | Right ascension (J2000) | Declination (J2000) | Abell richness class | Bautz–Morgan type | Notes |
|---|---|---|---|---|---|---|---|---|
| S636 | Antlia Cluster | Hydra–Centaurus Supercluster | Antlia | 10^{h} 30^{m} 03.5^{s} | −35° 19′ 24″ | 0 | I-II | |
| S740 | | | Centaurus | 13^{h} 43^{m} 32.3^{s} | −38° 11′ 05″ | 0 | I-II | |
| S1077 | | | Piscis Austrinus | 22^{h} 58^{m} 52.3^{s} | −34° 46′ 55″ | 2 | II-III | |

== See also ==
- Lists of astronomical objects
- List of galaxy groups and clusters
