= Abell 383 =

Galaxy cluster in the constellation Eridanus

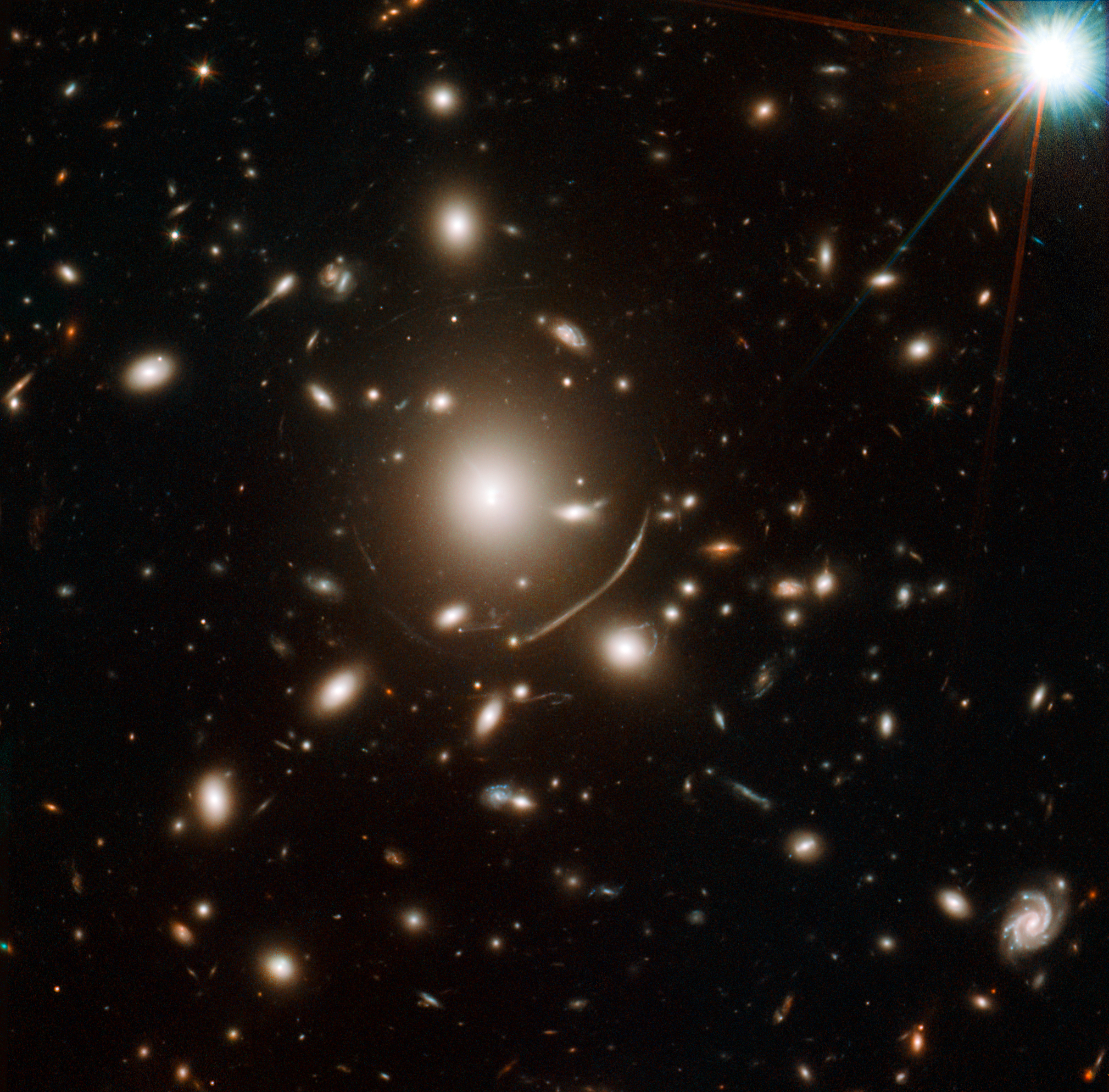
- Abell 383 imaged by the Hubble Space Telescope

Observation data (Epoch J2000)
- Constellation: Eridanus
- Right ascension: 02^{h} 48^{m} 06.9^{s}
- Declination: −03° 29′ 32″
- Richness class: 2
- Bautz–Morgan classification: II-III
- Redshift: 0.1871
- Distance: 762 Mpc (2,485 Mly) h^{−1}_{0.705}
- ICM temperature: 4.81 keV
- Binding mass: 3×10^{14} M_{☉}

Abell 383 is a galaxy cluster in the Abell catalogue.

== See also ==
- List of Abell clusters
