= Abell 1413 =

Galaxy cluster in constellations Coma Berenices and Leo

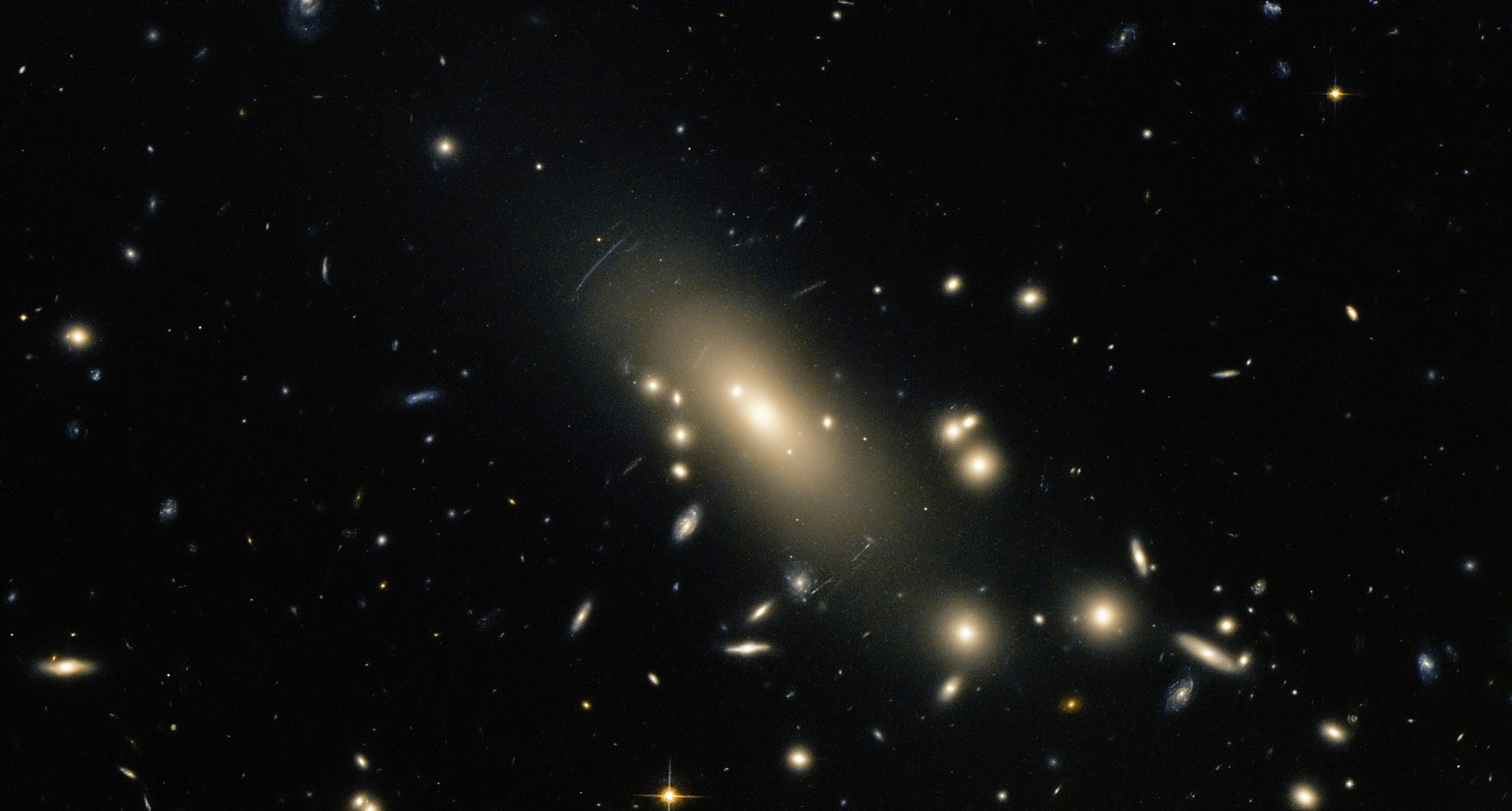
- The cD elliptical galaxy Abell 1413 BCG dominates this image of Abell 1413. Note the arcs caused by gravitational lensing. Image by HST's WFC3/ACS.

Observation data (Epoch J2000)
- Right ascension: 11^{h} 55^{m} 18.9^{s}
- Declination: +23° 24′ 31″
- Richness class: 3
- Bautz–Morgan classification: I
- Redshift: 0.1427
- Distance: 639.59 Mpc (2.1 billion ly) h^{−1}_{0.687}
- ICM temperature: 7.38 keV
- Binding mass: 7.57×10^{14} M_{☉}

Abell 1413 is a massive and rich type I galaxy cluster straddling the border between the constellations Leo and Coma Berenices, with the projected comoving distance of approximately 640 Mpc (2.1 billion ly). The cluster is especially notable due to the presence of its very large brightest cluster galaxy (BCG), one of the most extreme examples of its type, as well as one of the largest galaxies known. The cluster was first noted by George O. Abell in 1958.

== History ==
Abell 1413 is one of the original 2,712 galaxy clusters compiled in the Abell catalogue, compiled by the American astronomer George O. Abell in 1958, using data retrieved from the National Geographic Society – Palomar Observatory Sky Survey.

== Characteristics ==
Abell 1413 is classified as a type I galaxy cluster, characterized due to the presence of a single, massive galaxy in its center that dominates its smaller members. Thomas W. Noonan in 1971 characterized the cluster as having 60% the richness of the Coma Cluster, based on the assumption that the central cD elliptical is not a foreground object.

== Abell 1413 BCG ==
Abell 1413 Brightest Cluster Galaxy
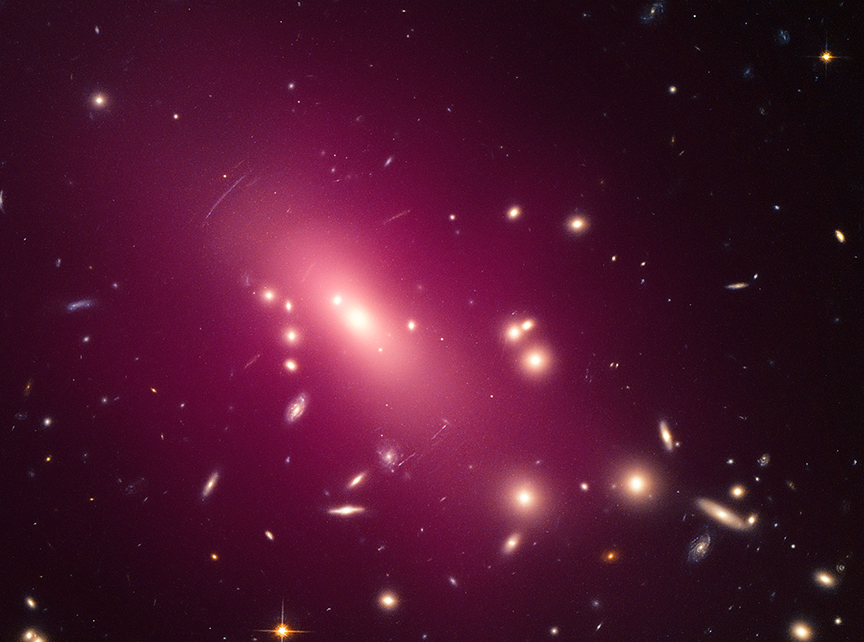
- Detail of the supergiant elliptical galaxy Abell 1413 BCG, taken by the Chandra X-ray Observatory overlaid with optical wavelength data

Observation data (J2000 epoch)
- Constellation: Leo
- Right ascension: 11^{h} 55^{m} 18.00^{s}
- Declination: +23° 24′ 17.81″
- Redshift: 0.14291
- Heliocentric radial velocity: 42,843.95±100.13 km/s
- Galactocentric velocity: 42,811±100 km/s
- Group or cluster: Abell 1413
- Apparent magnitude (V): 17.82

Characteristics
- Type: E; BrClG
- Size: 245.71 kpc (801,000 ly) (diameter; 25.0 mag/arcsec^{2} r-band isophote (SDSS)

Other designations
- MCG +04-28-097; WISEA J115518.00+232418.2; 2MASX J11551798+2324177; OGC 32; PGC 37477; Abell 1413 A

The brightest cluster galaxy of Abell 1413, or Abell 1413 BCG (MCG 04-28-097) is the supergiant elliptical galaxy that is the dominant member of the cluster. As early as 1965, astronomers William Wilson Morgan and Janet Rountree Lesh pointed out the galaxy's extreme nature, citing it as a "very large and luminous central galaxy" that could possibly be the largest of all cD ellipticals discovered, and hence must be checked for being a possible foreground object. During the following decade, several other papers observed the cluster, particularly its cD galaxy, hence revealing its very extreme properties. It was found to be among the most luminous galaxies known, and a titanic envelope was observed using very deep photographic plates. Following studies would then publish extremely large effective radii for the central galaxy.

Abell 1413 BCG is also notable due to its extreme ellipticity, making it the most elliptical brightest cluster galaxy known. It is rare for brightest cluster galaxies to have such an ellipticity; even then, Abell 1413 BCG is the most extreme known example of all of these.

== Further information ==
Abell 1413 is located 2 billion light years away from Earth between the constellations of Leo and Coma Berenices. It is one of 4,073 clusters of galaxies at redshift (meaning they are moving away from earth,) that are somewhat close to the Earth. Abell 1413 holds about 300 galaxies together with its strong gravity. Due to the strong interactions in the cluster, the material is heated up to 100 million degrees. Because of this intense heat, strong X-ray radiation is emitted from the cluster. Scientists using the Canada-France-Hawaii telescope observed Abell 1413 and built a sample of over 250 galaxies. These scientists consider Abell 1413 to be relaxed even though it has a highly elliptical shape. The scientists also concluded that the cluster ellipticity at large radii is around .8 while the cluster ellipticity at the center is about .35, and that the cluster is aligned in the North-South direction, a few degrees westward.

== See also ==
- List of Abell clusters
