= Abell 665 =

Galaxy cluster in the constellation Ursa Major

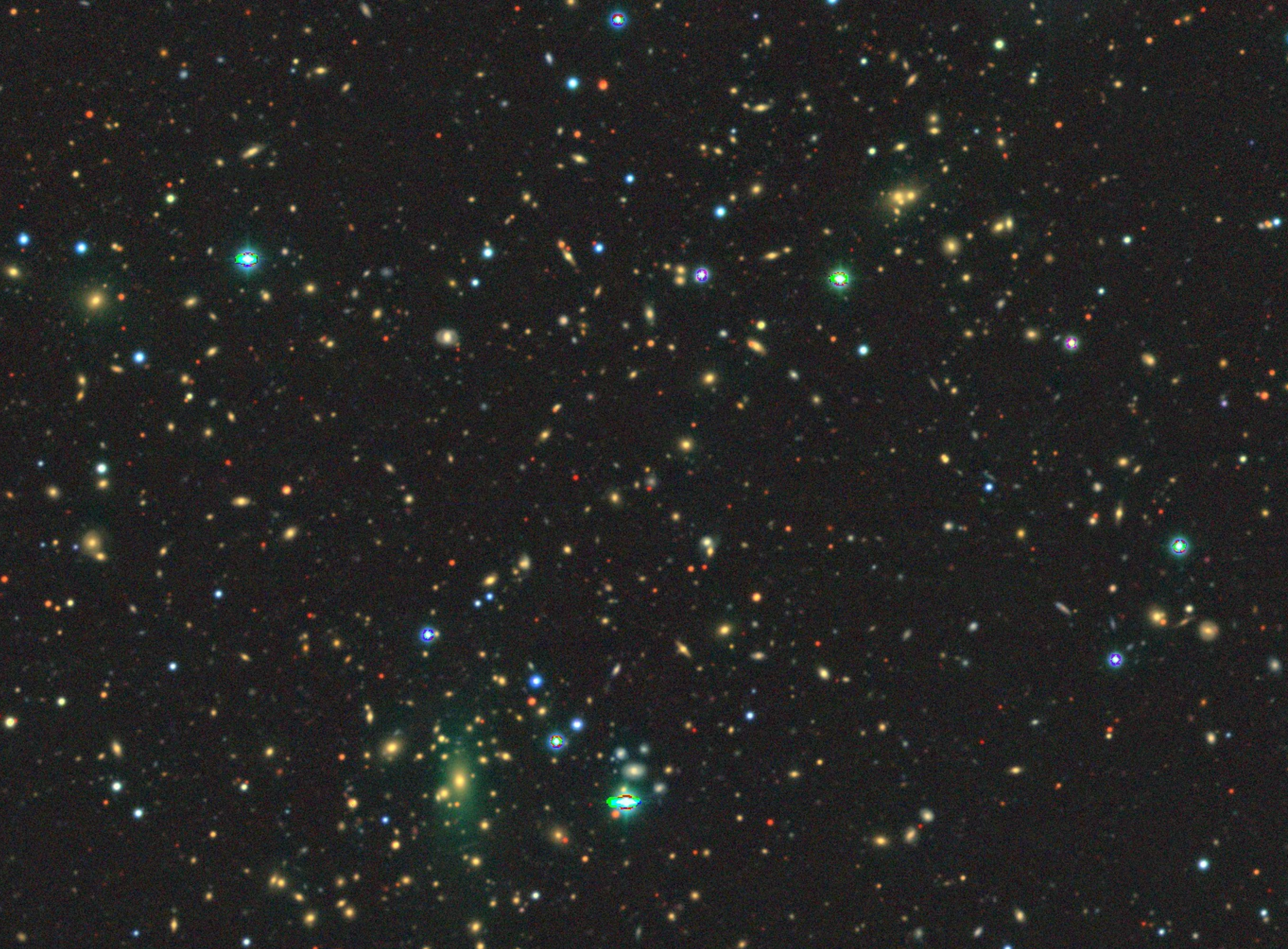
- Abell 665 seen by DESI Legacy Surveys DR11

Observation data (Epoch J2000)
- Constellation: Ursa Major
- Right ascension: 08^{h} 30^{m} 45.2^{s}
- Declination: +65° 52′ 55″
- Brightest member: 2MASX J08305736+6550299
- Richness class: 5
- Bautz–Morgan classification: III
- Velocity dispersion: 1 390^{+120}_{−110} km/s
- Redshift: 0.1819
- Distance: 720 Mpc (2,348 Mly) h^{−1}_{0.73}
- ICM temperature: 7.7 ± 0.4 keV (r ≲ 100 h^{−1}_{0.73} kpc)
- Binding mass: ~10^{15} h^{−1}_{0.75} M_{☉}
- X-ray flux: (11.8 ± 15.6%)×10^{−12} erg s^{−1} cm^{−2} (0.1–2.4 keV)

Abell 665 is a galaxy cluster in the Abell catalogue in the constellation Ursa Major. It is also known as the only cluster in his 1989 catalog to receive Abell's highest richness class of 5. This means that it contains at least 300 galaxies in the magnitude range of m_{3} to m_{3}+2, where m_{3} is the magnitude of the third-brightest member of the cluster. The clusters in all other richness classes contain less than 300 such galaxies. Abell 665's combination of high brightness and large distance, made it an excellent candidate along with 37 other clusters to help determine the Hubble constant using the Sunyaev–Zel'dovich effect in 2006.

Member velocity, cluster velocity dispersion, and X-ray data suggest that Abell 665 is composed of two similar-mass clusters which are at or very close to core crossing, give or take ≲ 0.5 gigayears.

== Gallery ==
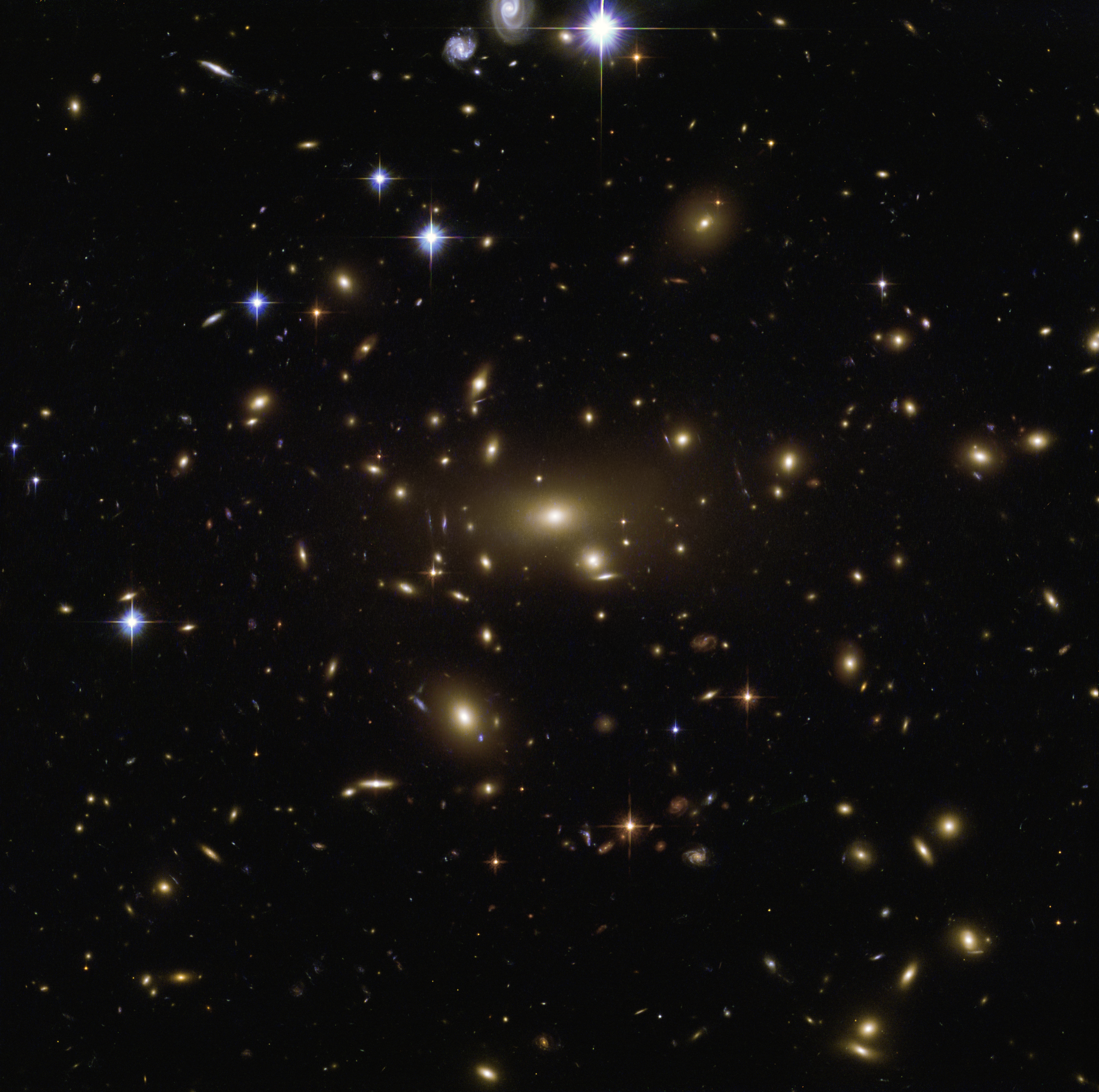
Abell 665 was named after George O. Abell, who included it in his 1958 catalogue.

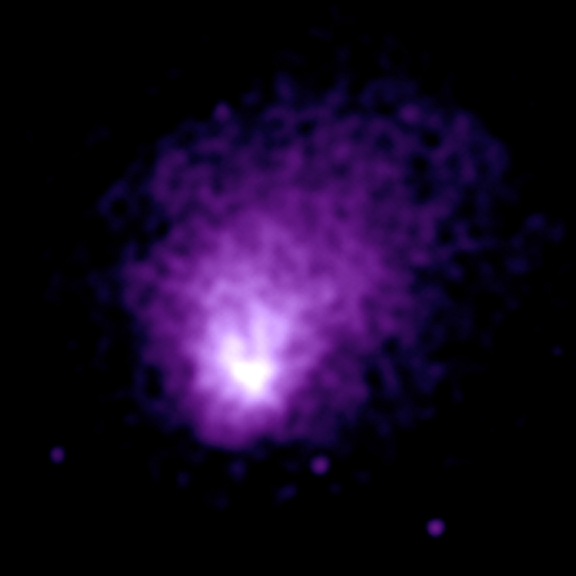
Abell 665 seen by Chandra X-ray Observatory

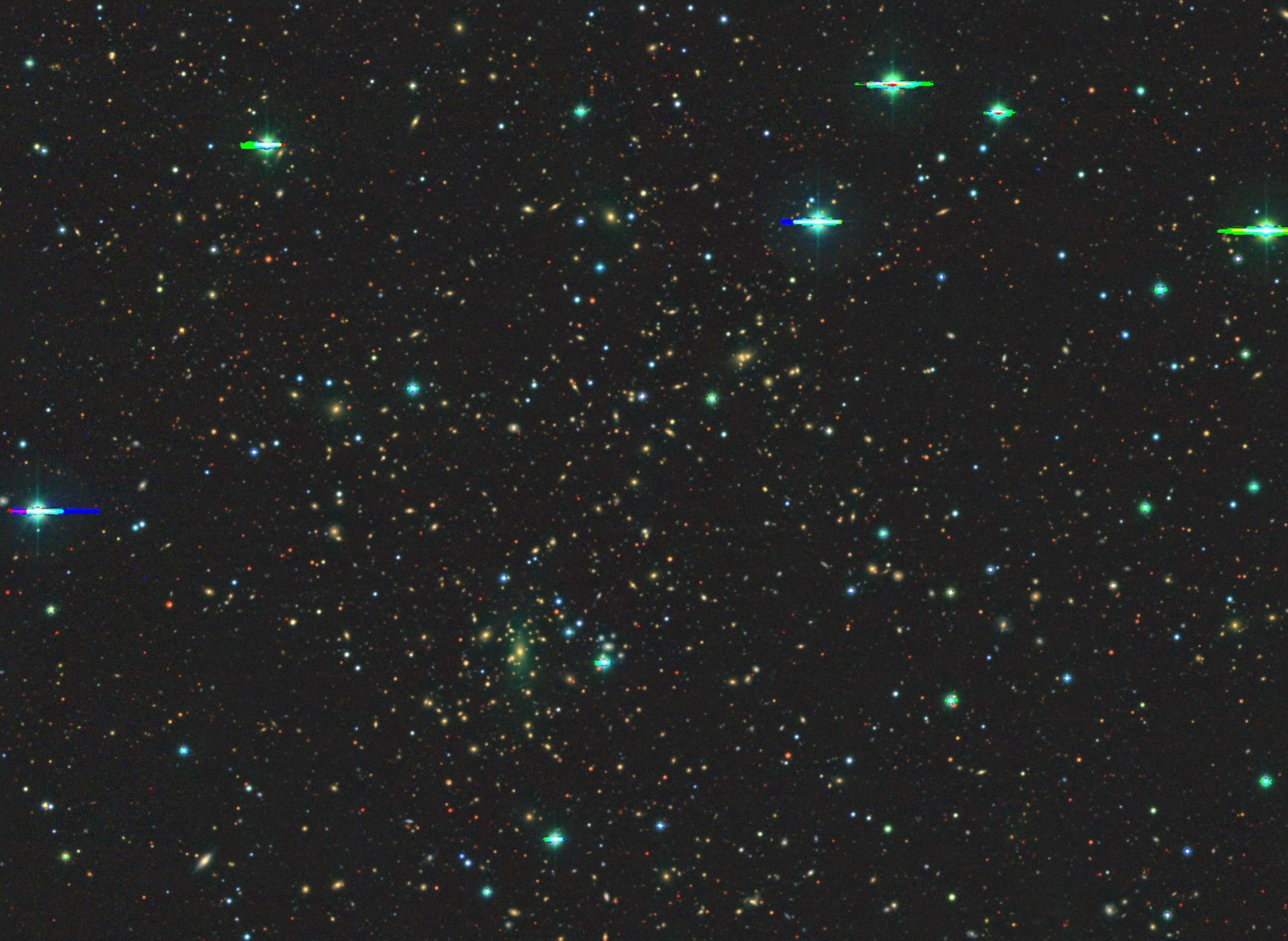
Abell 665 seen by DESI Legacy Survey DR11 within the radius of 5 arcminutes

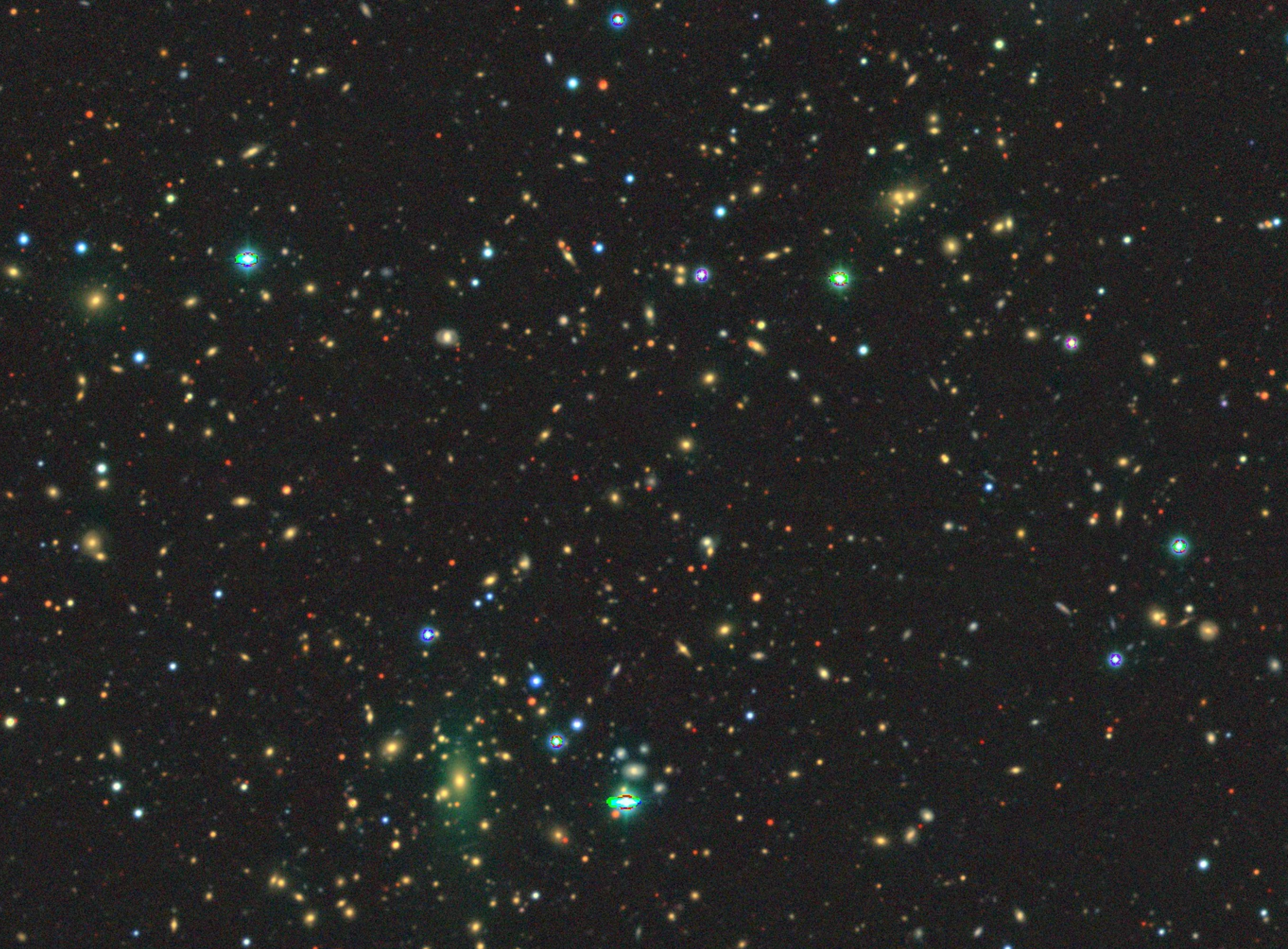
Abell 665 seen by DESI Legacy Survey within the radius of 100 arcseconds

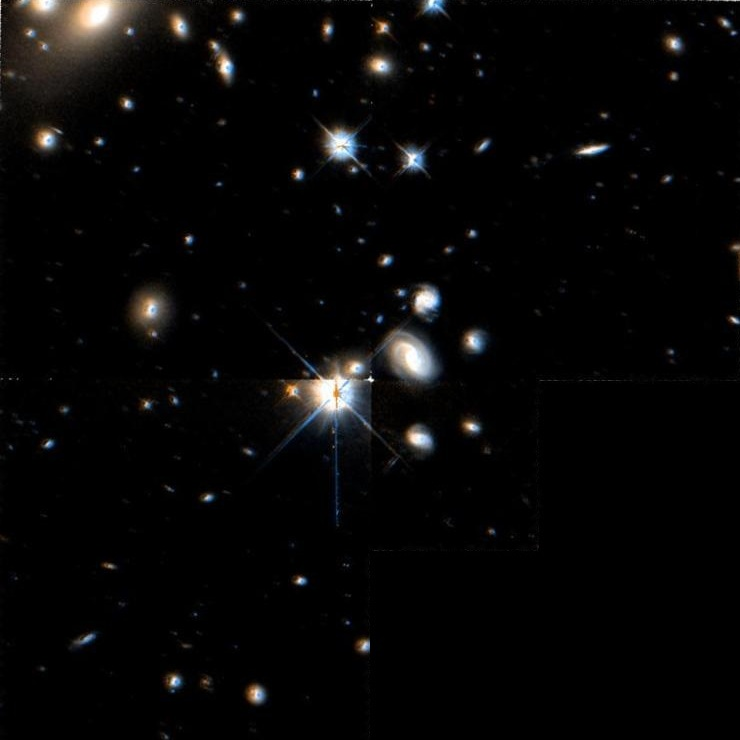
Abell 665

== See also ==
- List of Abell clusters
