= Abell 520 =

Galaxy cluster in the constellation of Orion

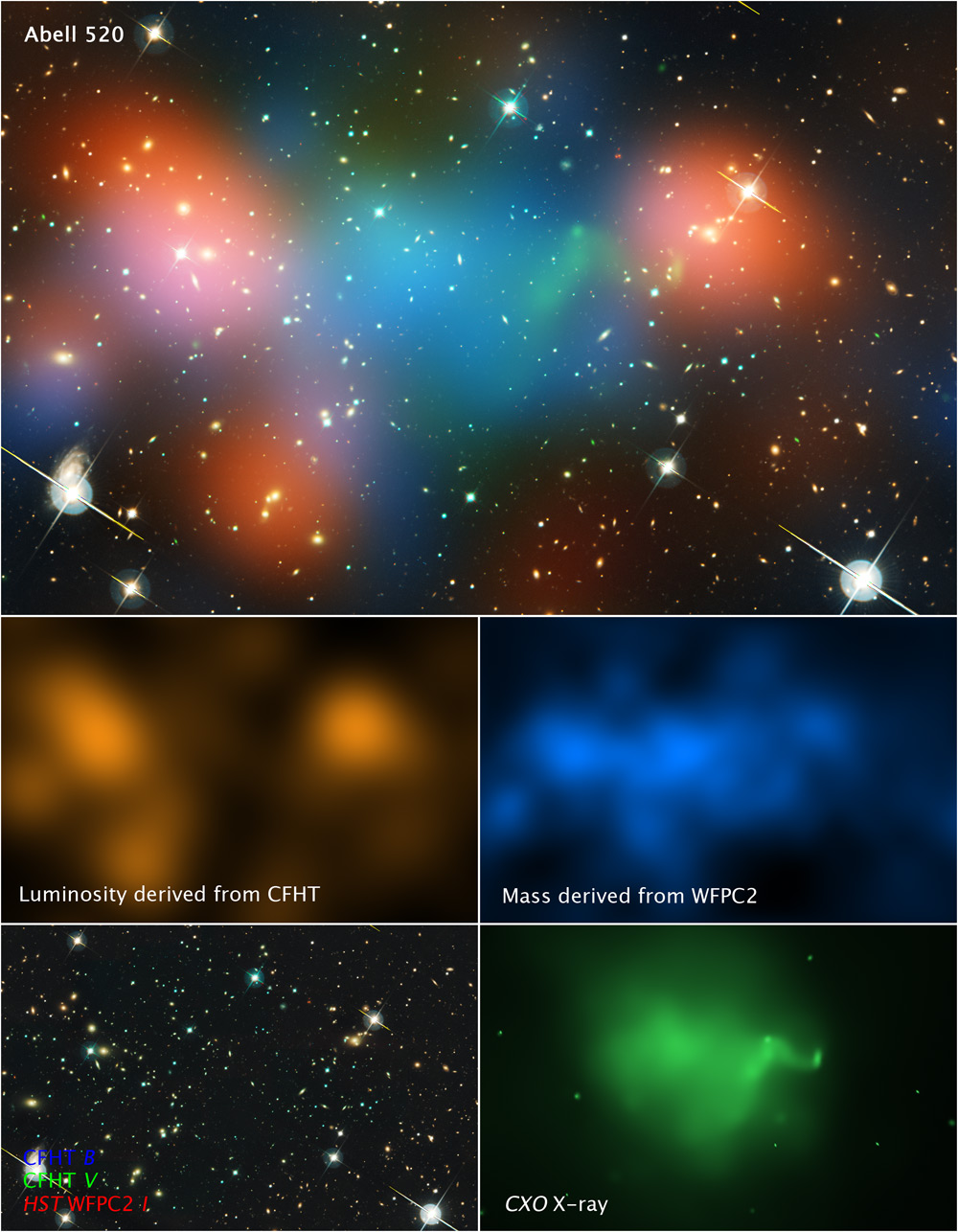
- Abell 520. Imaged January 2012.

Observation data (Epoch J2000)
- Constellation: Orion
- Right ascension: 04^{h} 54^{m} 03.80^{s}
- Declination: +02° 53′ 33.00″
- Number of galaxies: 289+
- Richness class: 3
- Bautz–Morgan classification: III
- Velocity dispersion: 1,066 km/s
- Redshift: 0.2
- Distance: 811 Mpc (2,645 Mly) h^{−1}_{0.705}
- ICM temperature: 9.8 keV
- Binding mass: 17×10^{14} h^{−1}_{0.70} M_{☉}
- X-ray luminosity: 14.44×10^{44} erg/s (0.1–2.4 keV)
- X-ray flux: 8.4×10^{−12} erg s^{−1} cm^{−2} (0.1–2.4 keV)

Other designations
- The Train Wreck Cluster

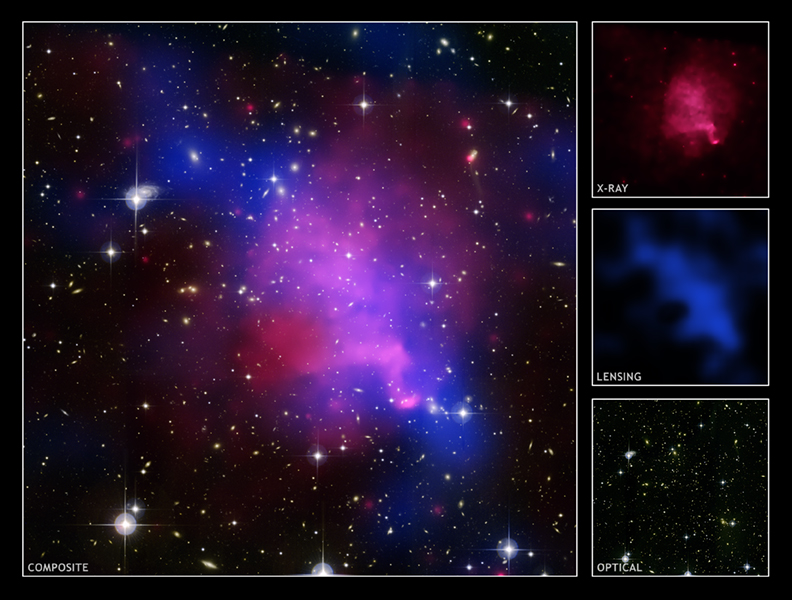
A520 pictured in X-ray, optical, and an inferred mass distribution based on the observed weak gravitational lensing. Imaged April 2007.

Abell 520 (also known as A520) is a galaxy cluster in the constellation Orion, located at a co-moving radial distance of 811 Mpc (2,645 Mly) and subtends 25 arcminutes on the Earth sky.

The cluster possesses an unusual substructure resulting from a major merger. It has been popularly nicknamed the Train Wreck Cluster, due to its chaotic structure. It is classified as a Bautz–Morgan type III cluster. Analysis of the motions of 293 galaxies in the cluster field suggested that Abell 520 was a cluster forming at the crossing of three filaments of the large scale structure.

The surprising substructure of Abell 520 was reported in 2007 from a weak gravitational lensing study based on Canada-France-Hawaii-Telescope (CFHT) imaging data. It was surprising at first, because the study found the "dark core" with a significant amount of mass in the region, where there is no concentration of bright cluster galaxies. No conventional understanding of dark matter could explain this peculiar concentration of dark matter. At the time, some thought that the substructure may arise from non-gravitational interaction of dark matter.

However, in the year 2012 two international teams of astronomers published conflicting results on Abell 520. While one study based on the Wide Field Planetary Camera 2 (WFPC2) on Hubble Space Telescope (HST) confirmed the previous claim of the dark core in Abell 520, the other study based on the Advanced Camera for Surveys (ACS) did not support the claim. Although the latter group found the "dark core", they also found luminous matter, which made the "dark core" not so dark—in particular, just as bright as any other galaxy with dark matter.

In 2014, a study of the ACS images by the original team claims to again have found evidence of a dark core, but is in a different location from the first two studies. A subsequent analysis by an independent third team of the gravitational shear catalogs of the two competing ACS analyses indicates marginal evidence for the core in both data sets and the authors "do not consider A520 as posing a significant challenge to the collisionless dark matter scenario."

== See also ==
- Abell catalogue
- Bullet Cluster
- List of Abell clusters
- List of galaxy clusters
