= Abell 754 =

Galaxy cluster

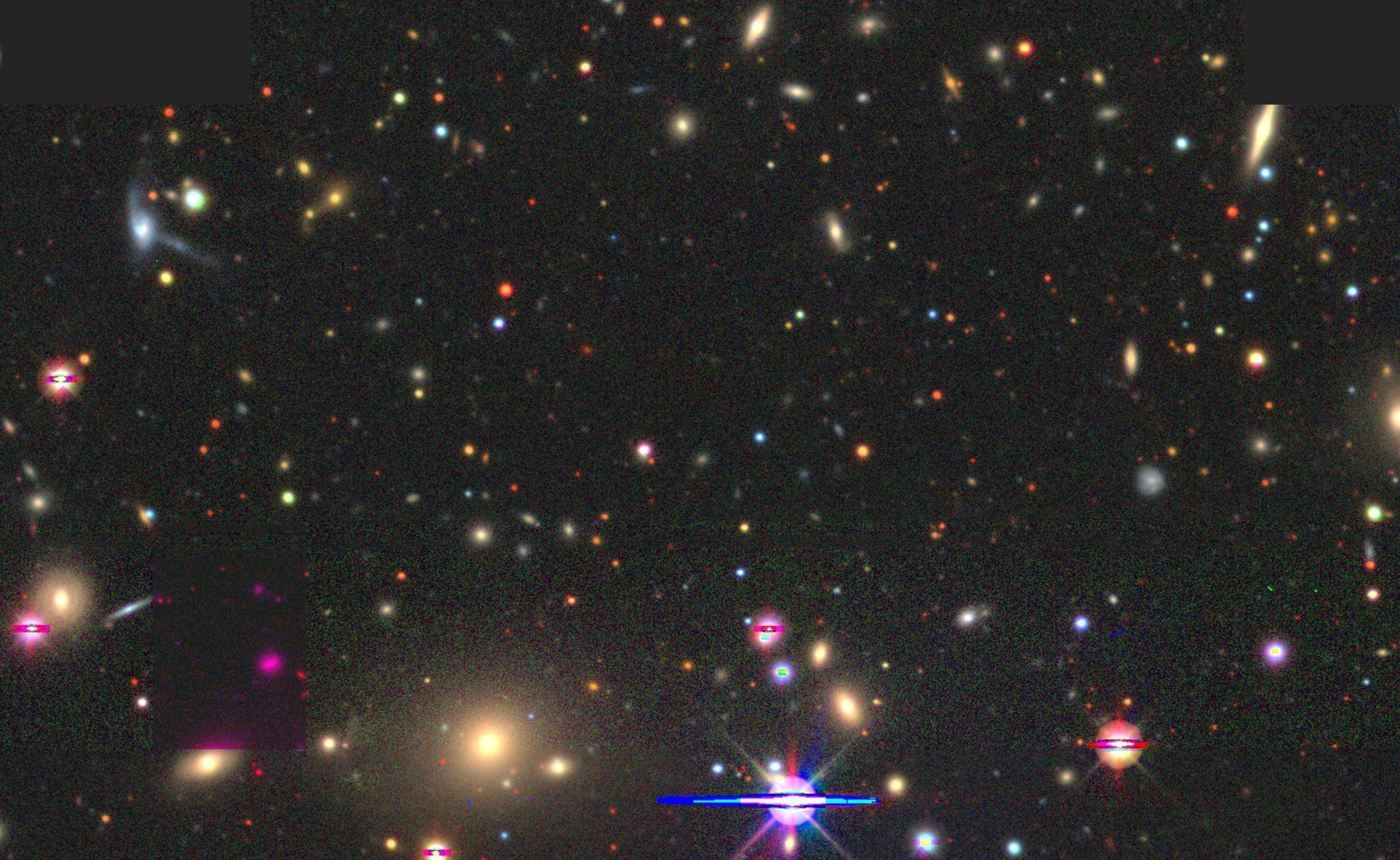
- Abell 754 seen by DESI Legacy Surveys DR11

Observation data (Epoch J2000)
- Constellation: Hydra
- Right ascension: 09^{h} 08^{m} 50.1^{s}
- Declination: −09° 38′ 12″
- Brightest member: LEDA 25714
- Richness class: 2
- Bautz–Morgan classification: I-II
- Redshift: 0.5420 (16 249 km/s)
- Distance: 233 Mpc (760 Mly) h^{−1}_{0.705}
- ICM temperature: 9.0 ± 0.3 keV
- X-ray flux: 4.35×10^{−11} erg s^{−1} cm^{−2} (0.5–2 keV)

Other designations
- Abell 0754; ABELL 0754; SCL 078 NED01; RXC J0909.1-0939; MAXI J0909-097

Abell 754 is a massive, X-ray luminous galaxy cluster in the constellation Hydra that was formed from the collision of two smaller clusters. This collision, which began about 500 million years ago, is ongoing, and the system is still disturbed. Eventually, the cluster will reach a level of equilibrium in a few billion years. Abell 754 is located Supercluster 78 or SCL 78 together with another 2 clusters, which are Abell 780 and Abell 838.

The Central Dominant galaxy (cD) of Abell 754 (LEDA 25714) is a large, slightly elongated, luminous elliptical galaxy, which has an effective radius of 47.72 kpc and an absolute magnitude of M_V = -23.99. Abell 754 has over 100 members confirmed and is referenced in over 560 scientific papers. Abell 754 has been studied by Very Large Array (VLA), Chandra X-ray Observatory, BeppoSAX, ROSAT and Giant Metrewave Radio Telescope (GMRT).

== Radio Properties ==
A low-frequency radio study have found that there are four diffuse radio sources and one new source within Abell 754. The "west relic" is only visible at very low frequencies (74 MHz), and has a steep spectrum (α > 2), suggesting it is a very old relic. The fourth diffuse feature's spectrum indicates it is likelihood a "cocoon of a radio galaxy" or a remnant of a radio galaxy that has been shut down about 90 million years ago. ASCA X-ray observations found that Abell 754 has a Intracluster Medium (ICM) temperature of 9.0 ± 0.3 keV, indicating it is massive and hot.

It is found that a subcluster, has moved through Abell 754 from east to west, that has cause the diffuse radio emission. It is also found that the four diffuse blobs exists along the east to west axis of A754. The eastern shock is found to be located near the X-ray peak and is close to two of the diffuse radio blobs, suggesting the shock is accelerating particles and creating the radio emission.

Using Numerical Simulations of Abell 754, suggests that the cluster is a result of a major merger of two clusters (mass ratio 2.5:1), astronomers found that the bar of X-ray emission is not centered on the galaxies, the X-ray surface brightness is elongated, and extreme temperature inhomogeneities. The temperature can be reaching up to 19 keV, indicating that this is a clear sign of merger, and the remnant merger gas is still settling. Due to the merger, it is found that the cluster takes longer than expected to settle down. This is indicates that we should be able to observe many post or pre merging clusters and it also supports that the universe is a low density universe, meaning that it is mainly consists of Dark matter and Dark energy, instead of physical matter.

The radio emission in another study found that Abell 754 is complex, consisting of two extended features. The western halo is coincident with the hottest gas and the shock front, consistent with being produced by primary electrons accelerated at the merger shock, while the eastern halo is not coincident with the shock gas and may be produce by secondary protons from a proton-proton collision.

== X-Ray Properties ==
Using observations from Chandra X-ray Observatory, BeppoSAX and ROSAT, it is found that there is a cool component or cool gas in the cluster, separated from the hot ICM, extending out to 8 arcminutes. The emission is found not to be from the elliptical galaxies, because they are too faint. Its peak lies between the low frequency radio halos, the most likely explanation is that the emission is coming from the embedded groups falling into the cluster.

== Gallery ==
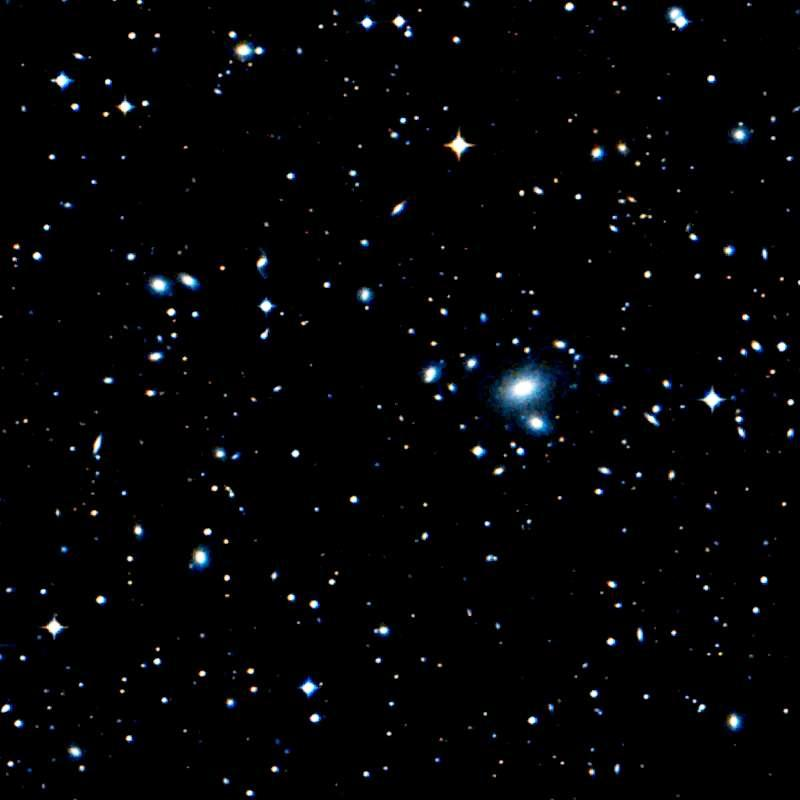
Abell 754

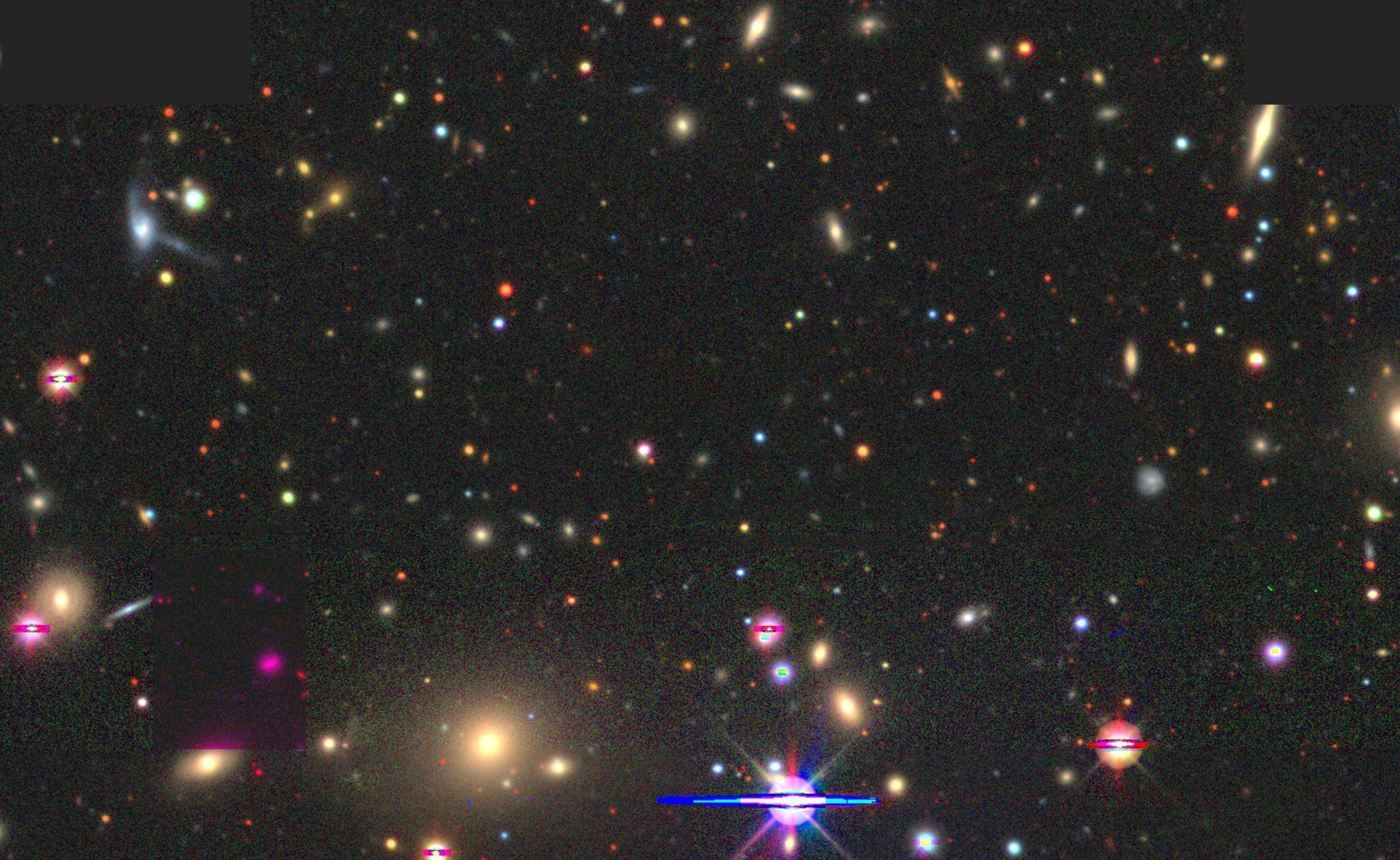
Abell 754 seen by DESI Legacy Surveys

== See also ==
- Abell catalogue
- List of Abell clusters
