= Abell 907 =

Galaxy cluster

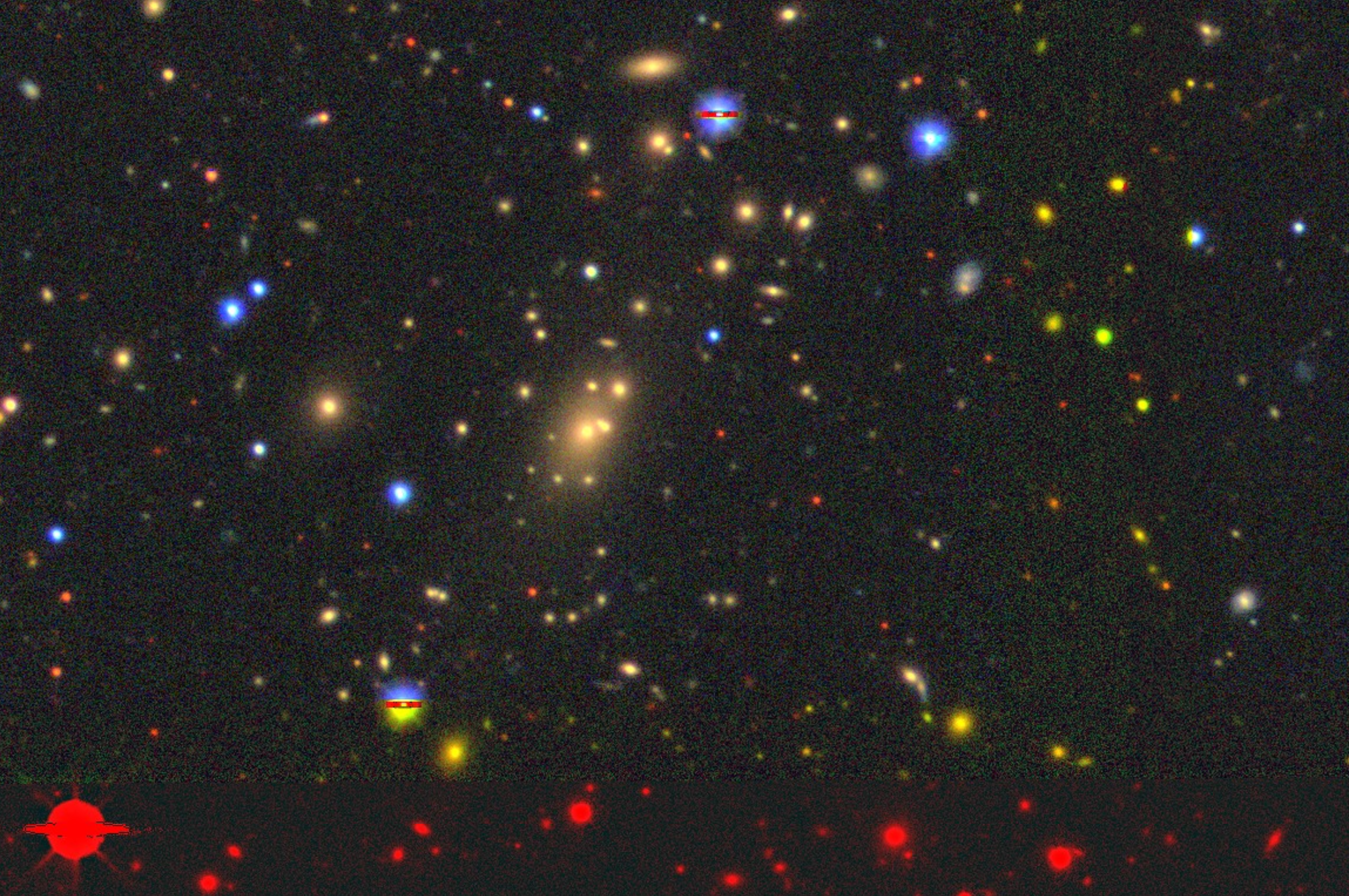
- Abell 907 seen by DESI Legacy Surveys DR11

Observation data (Epoch J2000)
- Constellation: Sextans
- Right ascension: 09^{h} 58^{m} 21.1^{s}
- Declination: −11° 03′ 22″
- Richness class: 1
- Redshift: 0.15270
- Distance: 634 Mpc (2,068 Mly) h^{−1}_{0.705}
- ICM temperature: 5.96 keV
- Binding mass: 4.56×10^{14} M_{☉}
- X-ray flux: (7.833 ± 8.3%) ×10^{−12} erg s^{−1} cm^{−2} (0.1–2.4 keV)

Abell 907 is a galaxy cluster in the Abell catalogue.

== See also ==
- List of Abell clusters
