= AMiBA =

Radio telescope on Mauna Loa, Hawaii

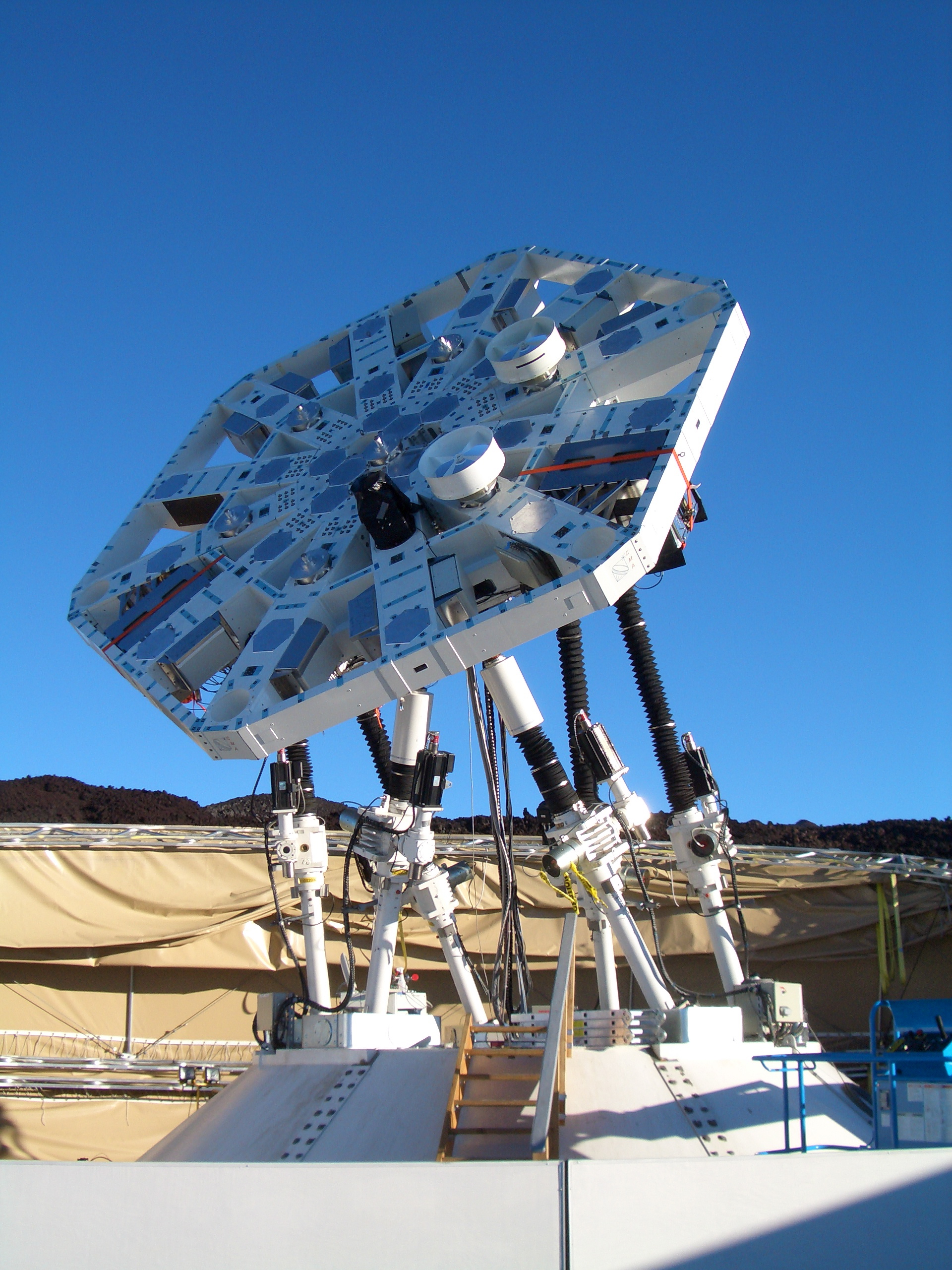
- AMiBA during construction in 2006
- Location: Hawaiʻi County, Hawaii
- Coordinates: 19°32′10″N 155°34′31″W
- Altitude: 3,396 m (11,142 ft)
- Wavelength: 3 mm (100 GHz)
- Diameter: 0.576 m (1 ft 10.7 in)
- Website: ytla.asiaa.sinica.edu.tw
- Location within Hawaii
- Related media on Commons

The Yuan-Tseh Lee Array for Microwave Background Anisotropy, also known as the Array for Microwave Background Anisotropy (AMiBA), is a radio telescope designed to observe the cosmic microwave background and the Sunyaev-Zel'dovich effect in clusters of galaxies. It is located on Mauna Loa in Hawaii, at 3,396 metres (11,142 ft) above sea level.

AMiBA was originally configured as a 7-element interferometer atop a hexapod mount. Observations at a wavelength of 3 mm (86–102 GHz) started in October 2006, and the detections of six clusters by the Sunyaev-Zel'dovich effect were announced in 2008. In 2009 the telescope was upgraded to 13 elements, and it is capable of further expansion to 19 elements. AMiBA is the result of a collaboration between the Academia Sinica Institute of Astronomy and Astrophysics, the National Taiwan University and the Australia Telescope National Facility, and also involves researchers from other universities.

After completion of the SZE campaigns, the telescope has been repurposed to study the evolution of molecular gas throughout the history of the Universe. It is now referred to as the Yuan-Tseh Lee Array (YTLA).

The array had stopped operating in its original missions in 2018, fully ceased its operations in 2021, with the hexapod currently anticipating no further observations. Further actions are still undisclosed as of September, 2026.

== Design ==
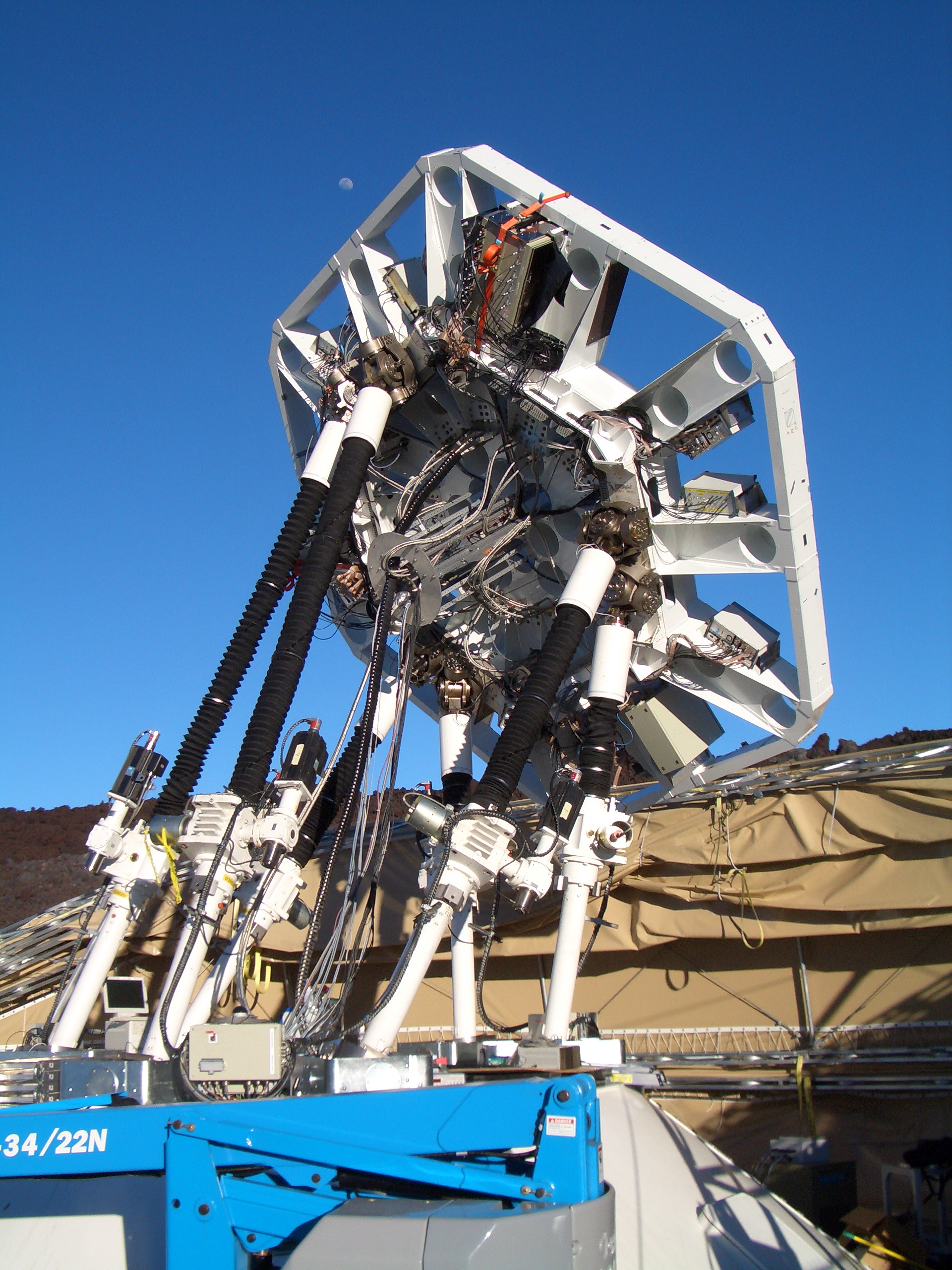
The rear of the hexapod mount

AMiBA was initially configured as a 7-element interferometer, using 0.576 m Cassegrain dishes mounted on a 6 m carbon fibre hexapod mount. It is located on Mauna Loa, Hawaii, and observes at 3 mm (86–102 GHz) to minimize foreground emission from other, non-thermal sources. The telescope has a retractable shelter, made from seven steel trusses and PVC fabric.

The receivers are based on monolithic microwave integrated circuit (MMIC) technology, with low-noise amplifiers cooled to 15 K, which have 20 GHz bandwidths and provide 46 dB of amplification. The signals are mixed with a local oscillator to reduce their frequency, prior to correlation with an analog correlator. The system temperatures are between 55 and 75 K.

AMiBA started in 2000, with funding for 4 years from the Cosmology and Particle Astrophysics Project of the Taiwan Ministry of Education. A 2-element prototype was set up on Mauna Loa in 2002. Further funding for a second 4 years was provided by the National Science Council. The mount arrived on site in 2004, and the platform was installed in 2005. The first 7 elements were then installed ("AMiBA7"), and the telescope's first light was in September 2006, observing Jupiter. The telescope was dedicated in October 2006 to Yuan-Tseh Lee. The array was upgraded to have thirteen 1.2 m dishes in 2009 ("AMiBA13"). After extensive testing and calibration, scientific observations resumed in 2011. It is further expandable up to 19 elements.

== SZE Observations ==
The primary goal of AMiBA is to observe both the temperature and polarization anisotropies in the cosmic microwave background at multipoles between 800 and 8,000 (corresponding to between 2 and 20 arcminutes on the sky), as well as observing the thermal Sunyaev-Zel'dovich effect in clusters of galaxies, which has a maximum decrement around 100 GHz. In its initial configuration, it measures up to multipoles of 3,000 with a resolution of around 6 arcminutes. The telescope only observes at night during good weather, using planets for calibration.

Six clusters were imaged in 2007: the Abell clusters 1689, 1995, 2142, 2163, 2261 and 2390, which have redshifts between 0.091 and 0.322. For the largest and brightest four of these—Abell 1689, 2261, 2142 and 2390—comparisons were made with X-ray and Subaru weak lensing data to study the cluster layout and radial properties, specifically of the mass profiles and baryon content.

13-element results from the YTLA were published in this paper.

== Intensity Mapping of Molecular Gas ==
The YTLA has been repurposed with the goal of detection and characterization of molecular gas at high redshift through the technique of intensity mapping. Molecular gas, which is primarily in the form of the hydrogen molecule H_{2}, is the material from which stars form. Understanding the gas content and evolution throughout the history of the Universe informs astronomers about the processes of star formation and galaxy growth. Unfortunately, cold H_{2} is not easily detectable. Carbon monoxide (CO) is commonly used as a tracer of H_{2}.

The YTLA uses the technique of intensity mapping (IM) to study molecular gas. Rather than attempting to detect individual, distant and faint galaxies directly, the YTLA measures the statistical properties of many galaxies over a very large volume. Although it is much smaller than powerful telescopes such as ALMA and the VLA, the YTLA can provide critical and unique information on galaxy evolution. The intensity mapping technique is used over a wide range of wavelengths to study the distant Universe.

An upgrade of analog and digital infrastructure at the YTLA was necessary to enable IM. In particular, a digital correlator based on CASPER technology and the ASIAA-developed 5 GS/s sampler was developed. The digital correlator produces 2 x 2 GHz bandwidth in each of two polarizations for 7 antennas.

== Collaboration ==
AMiBA is the result of a collaboration between the Academia Sinica Institute of Astronomy and Astrophysics, the National Taiwan University and the Australia Telescope National Facility. It also involves researchers from the Harvard-Smithsonian Center for Astrophysics, the National Radio Astronomy Observatory, the University of Hawaii, the University of Bristol, Nottingham Trent University, the Canadian Institute for Theoretical Astrophysics and the Carnegie-Mellon University.

== See also ==
- List of astronomical observatories
