= Microscopium Supercluster =

Galaxy supercluster

Observation data (Epoch )
- Constellation: Microscopium
- Redshift: 0.09

The Microscopium Supercluster is a supercluster located in the constellation Microscopium. First noticed in the early 1990s, it has received little study. It is composed of Abell clusters 3695 and 3696, while the relations of Abell clusters 3693 and 3705 in the same field are unclear.

== See also ==
- Abell catalogue
- Large scale structure of the universe
- List of Abell clusters
- List of superclusters
