= Abell 671 =

Galaxy in the constellation Cancer

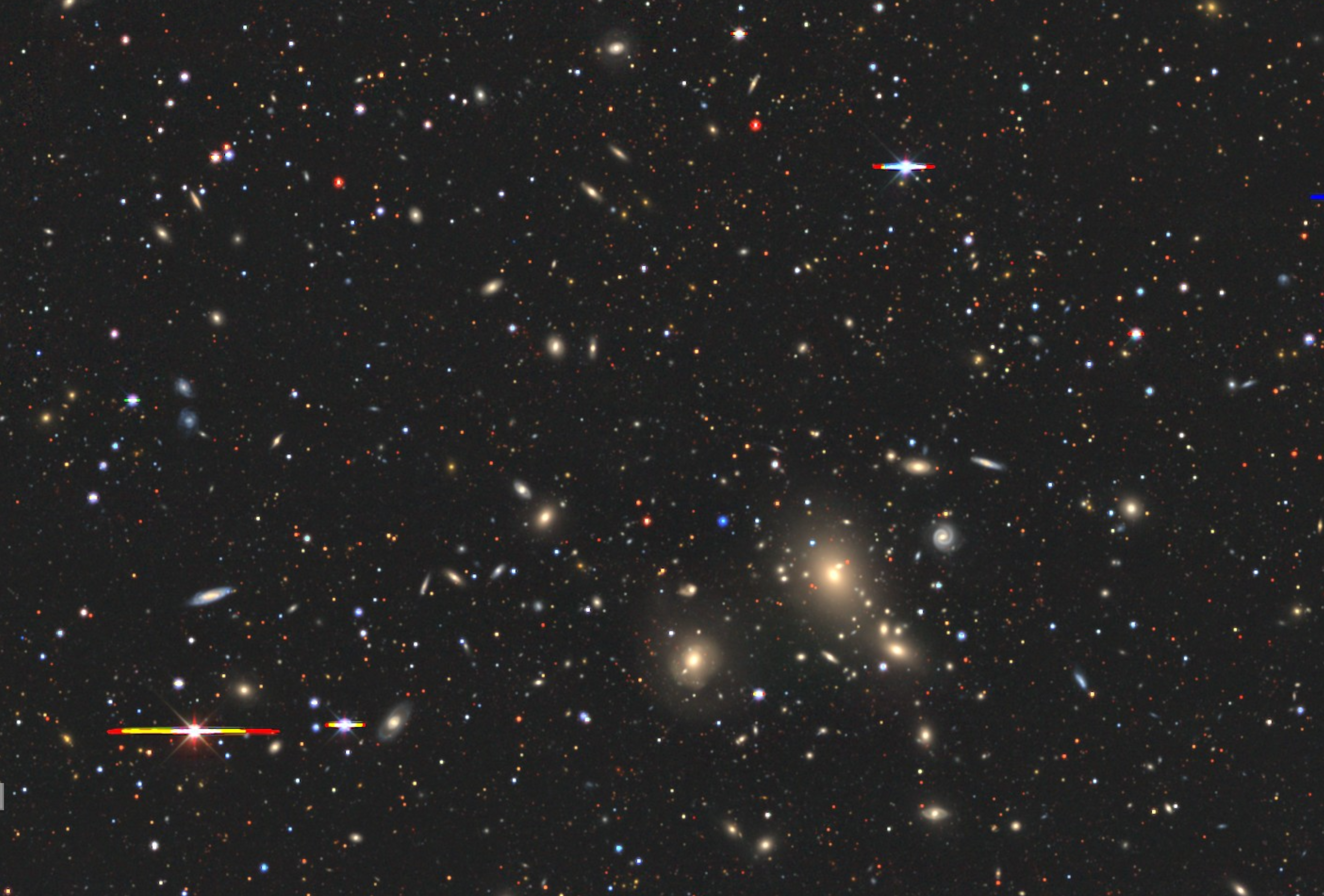
- Abell 671 seen by DESI Legacy Surveys

Observation data (Epoch J2000)
- Constellation: Cancer
- Right ascension: 08^{h} 28^{m} 29.3^{s}
- Declination: +03° 25′ 01″
- Brightest member: IC 2378
- Richness class: 0
- Bautz–Morgan classification: II-III
- Redshift: 0.050200
- Distance: 600 million ly

Other designations
- FR 42; RX J0828.6+3025; RXGCC 293; RXC J0828.6+3025; WBL 183

Abell 671 is a galaxy cluster in the constellation Cancer. It is part of the Abell catalogue of galaxy clusters and is also designated ACO 671.

A 2012 photometric and spectroscopic study of Abell 671 using the Beijing–Arizona–Taiwan–Connecticut survey and Sloan Digital Sky Survey data identified 103 spectroscopically confirmed member galaxies and 97 additional photometric member candidates. The study gave the cluster a redshift of 0.0502, an Abell richness class of 0, and a Bautz–Morgan classification of II–III. It also reported X-ray emission detected by the Einstein Observatory and ROSAT, and described the cluster as a relatively poor system.

The central dominant galaxy of Abell 671 is IC 2378, a large, bright, moderately elongated elliptical galaxy. Abell 671 have at least 100 identified members, and is also referenced in 288 bibliographic links.
