= Abell 3412 =

Galaxy cluster in the constellation Hydra

- Abell 3411 is a galaxy cluster located about two billion light years from Earth.

Observation data (Epoch J2000)
- Right ascension: 08^{h} 42^{m} 05^{s}
- Declination: −17° 35.8′
- Richness class: 1
- Bautz–Morgan classification: II-III
- Distance: 2,000 Mly (610 Mpc)

Abell 3412 is a galaxy cluster in the constellation Hydra. It is located about two billion light-years from Earth and weighs about a million billion times the mass of the Sun.

== See also ==
- Abell catalogue
