= Abell 2163 =

Galaxy cluster located in the Ophiuchus constellation

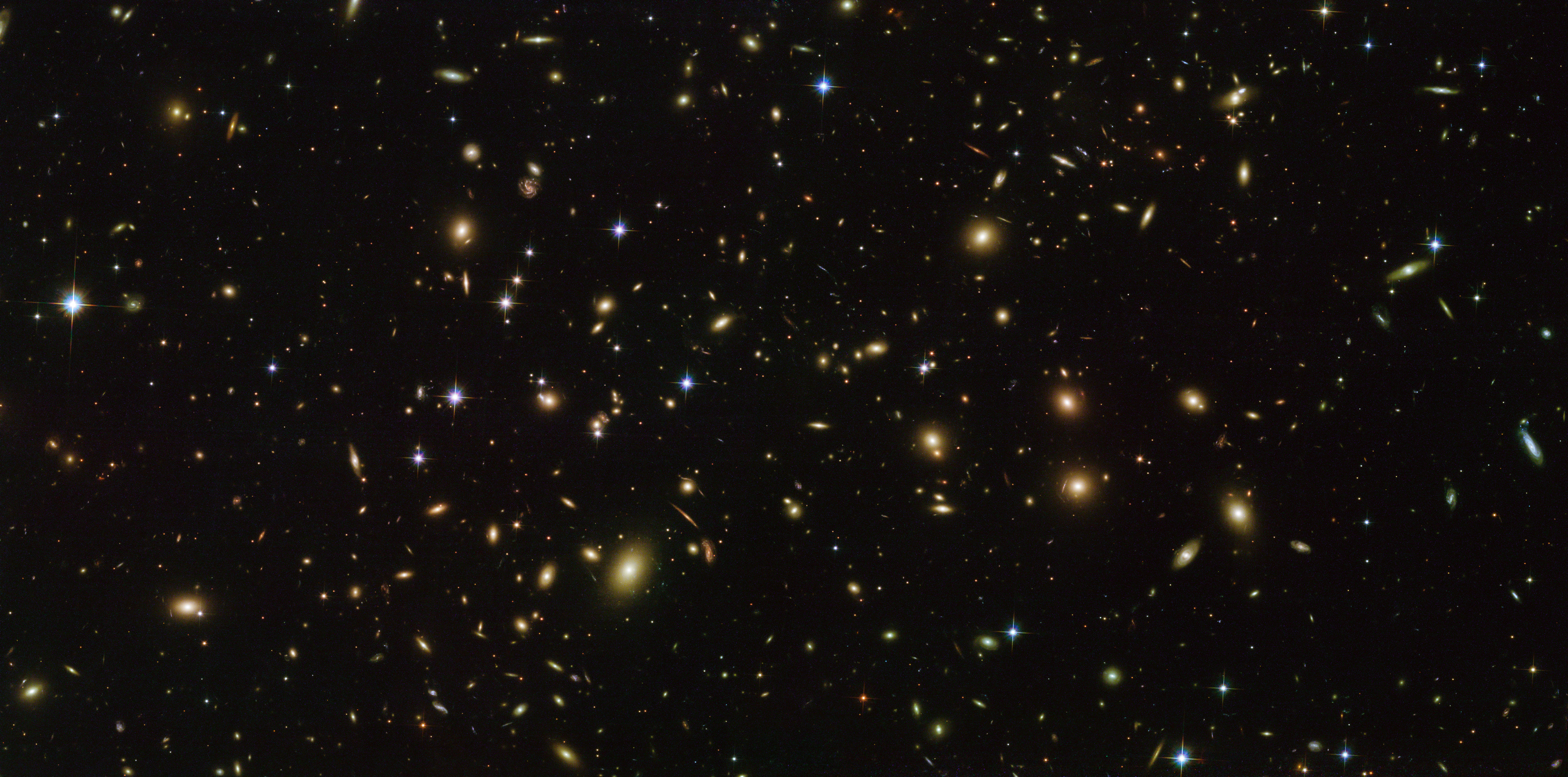
- Abell 2163 taken by Hubble Space Telescope.

Observation data (Epoch J2000)
- Constellation: Ophiuchus
- Right ascension: 16^{h} 15^{m} 34.1^{s}
- Declination: −06° 07′ 26.04″
- Richness class: 2
- Redshift: 0.2030
- Distance: 828 Mpc (2,701 Mly) h^{−1}_{0.705}
- ICM temperature: 11.5–14.6 keV
- Binding mass: 4.6 × 10^{15} M_{☉}
- X-ray luminosity: 6 × 10^{45}erg/s
- X-ray flux: 1.4×10^{−11} erg s^{−1} cm^{−2} (0.5–2 keV)

Abell 2163 is one of the richest and most distant of the clusters of galaxies found in the Abell catalogue. Its abell richness class is 2 and position is at a redshift z=0.2. Data from Chandra X-ray Observatory have shown that it is the hottest galaxy cluster in the Abell catalogue. It is also a merging cluster.

The galaxy density and mass distribution in the central region of this cluster have also been determined by weak gravitational lensing. These analyses show very similar mass and galaxy distributions, with two coincident maxima and a flat shape elongated in the east-west direction, but the weak lensing signal is surprisingly faint in comparison to what could be expected from the cluster X-ray properties. However, these detailed studies are limited to the inner 8’×8’ region of the cluster, and do not include the peripheral clumps such as A2163-B. La Barbera et al. (2004) estimated the photometric redshifts of galaxies in A2163-B, showing that this structure lies at the typical redshift of the main cluster (z = 0.215 ± 0.0125).

There is also an extremely bright and large radio halo present in the cluster, and is one of the brightest known clusters.

== See also ==
- Abell catalogue
- List of Abell clusters
- X-ray astronomy
