= Abell 576 =

Galaxy cluster

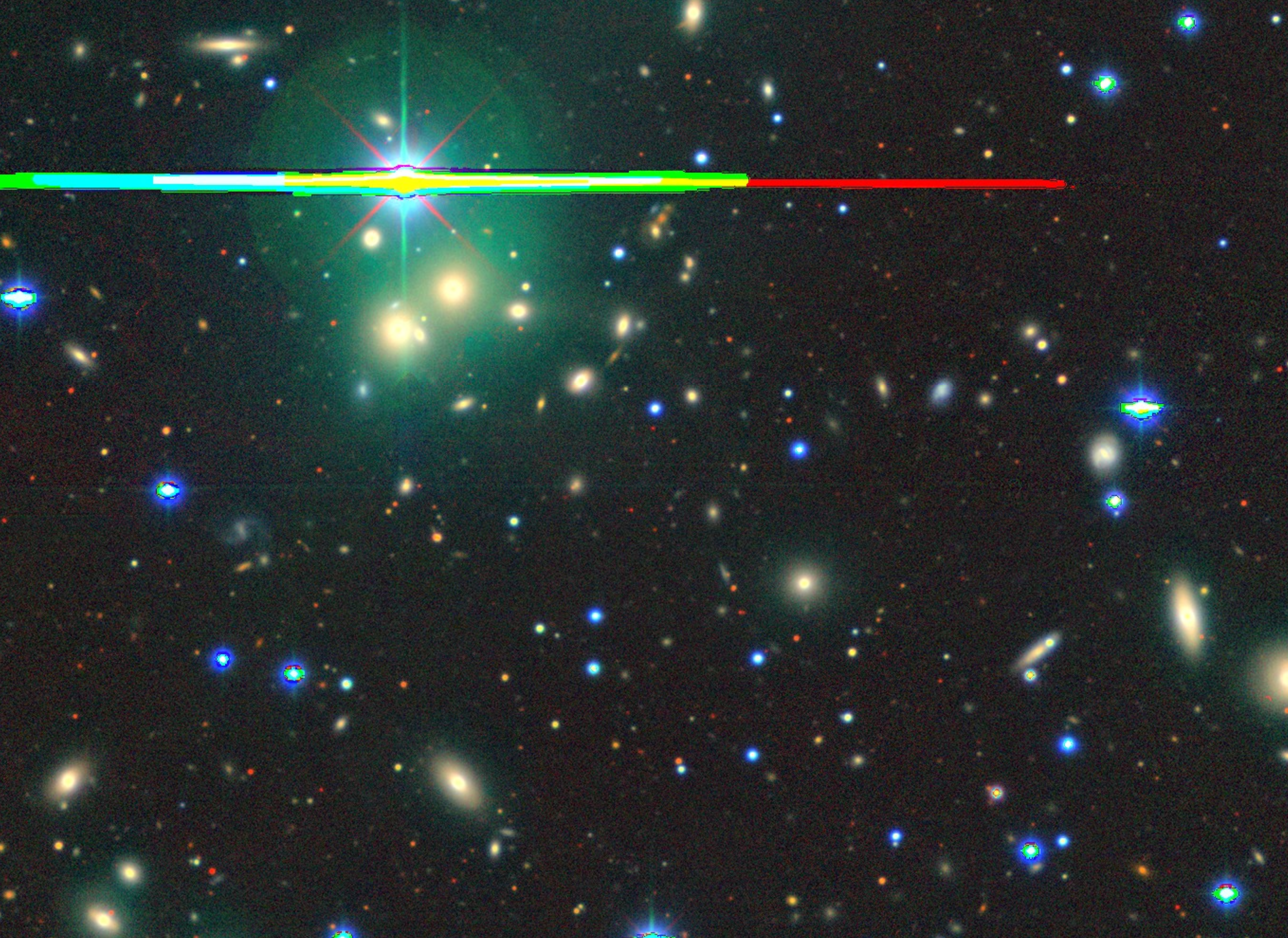
- Abell 576 seen by DESI Legacy Surveys DR11

Observation data (Epoch J2000)
- Constellation: Lynx
- Right ascension: 07^{h} 21^{m} 24.2^{s}
- Declination: +55° 44′ 20″
- Bautz–Morgan classification: III
- Redshift: 0.038370
- Distance: 170.75 ± 12.06 MPC

Other designations
- Abell 0576; ABELL 0576; UGCl 096; ZwCl 0718.9+5412; 2MASSCL J0721+5544

Abell 576 is a galaxy cluster in the constellation Lynx. Detailed study has revealed that there are two clusters in the process of merging.
