= Abell 13 =

Planetary nebula in the constellation Orion

Emission nebula
- Planetary nebula
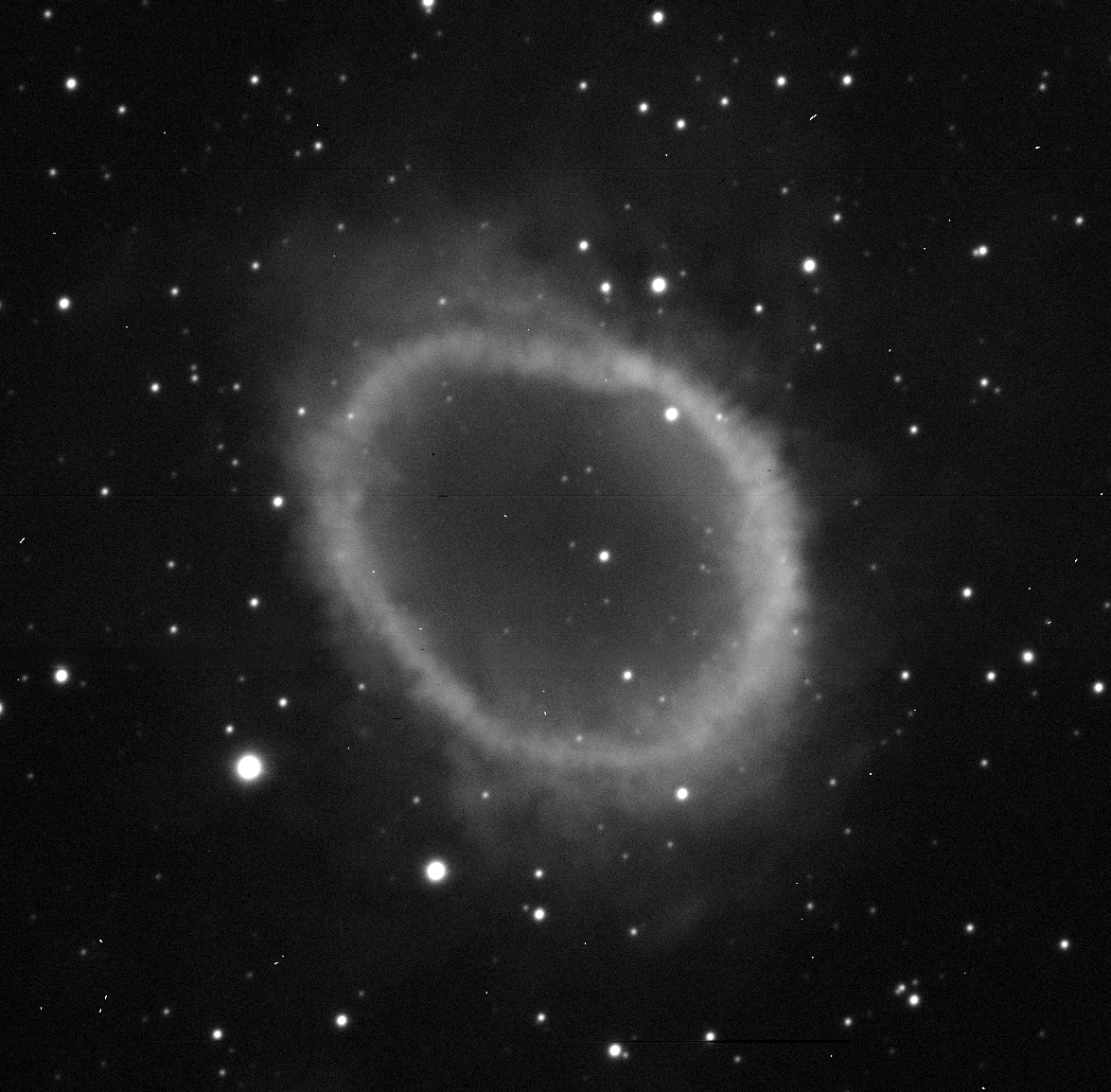
- H-alpha image of Abell 13 taken with the Very Large Telescope

Observation data: J2000 epoch
- Right ascension: 06^{h} 04^{m} 47.9^{s}
- Declination: +03° 56′ 36″
- Distance: 3900 ly
- Apparent magnitude (V): 19.87
- Apparent dimensions (V): 2' 32".58
- Constellation: Orion
- Notable features: An attractive PN
- Designations: A66 13, PK 204-08.1, PN G 204.0-08.5, GSC2 N220002316027, UBC 6150, PN YM 28, UBV M 44654, CSI +03-06022

Abell 13 (known as the Onion ring nebula) is a large and highly evolved planetary nebula located 3900 light years from Earth in the constellation of Orion. It has a reddish color and is very faint. Abell 13 has a circular outer ring of Ha (Hydrogen-alpha).

The nebula was discovered in 1955 by an American astronomer named George Ogden Abell on the photo plates of the Palomar Observatory Sky Survey (POSS).
