= Abell S1077 =

Galaxy cluster in the constellation Piscis Austrinus

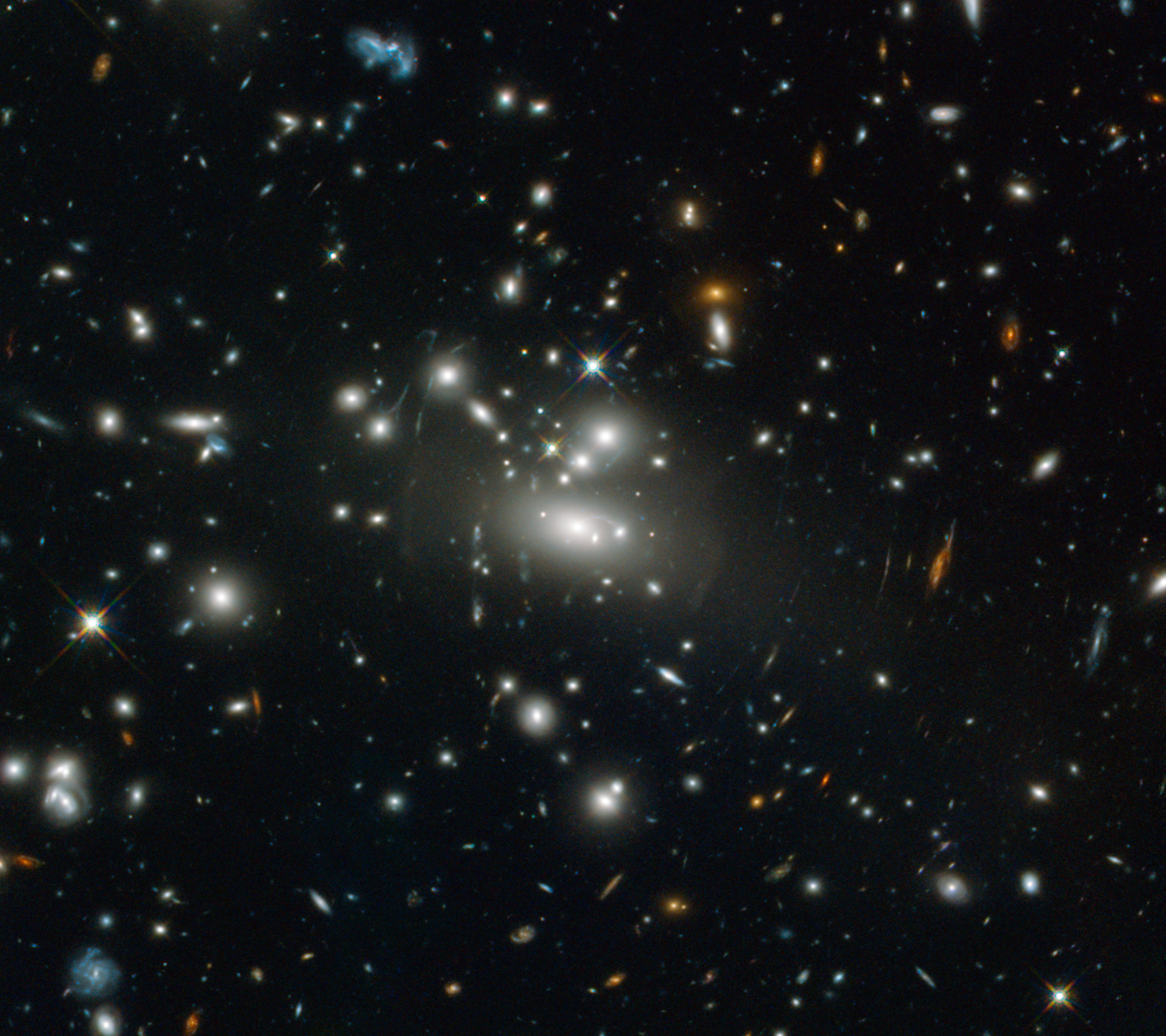
- Hubble image of the galaxy cluster Abell S1077

Observation data (Epoch J2000)
- Constellation(s): Piscis Austrinus
- Right ascension: 22^{h} 58^{m} 52.34^{s}
- Declination: −34° 46′ 54.6″
- Number of galaxies: 220
- Redshift: 0.312

Other designations
- ACO S 1077, ACCG 114, BAX 344.7181-34.7818

Abell S1077 is a galaxy cluster located in the constellation Piscis Austrinus.
