= Gravitational binding energy =

Minimum energy to remove a system from a gravitationally bound state

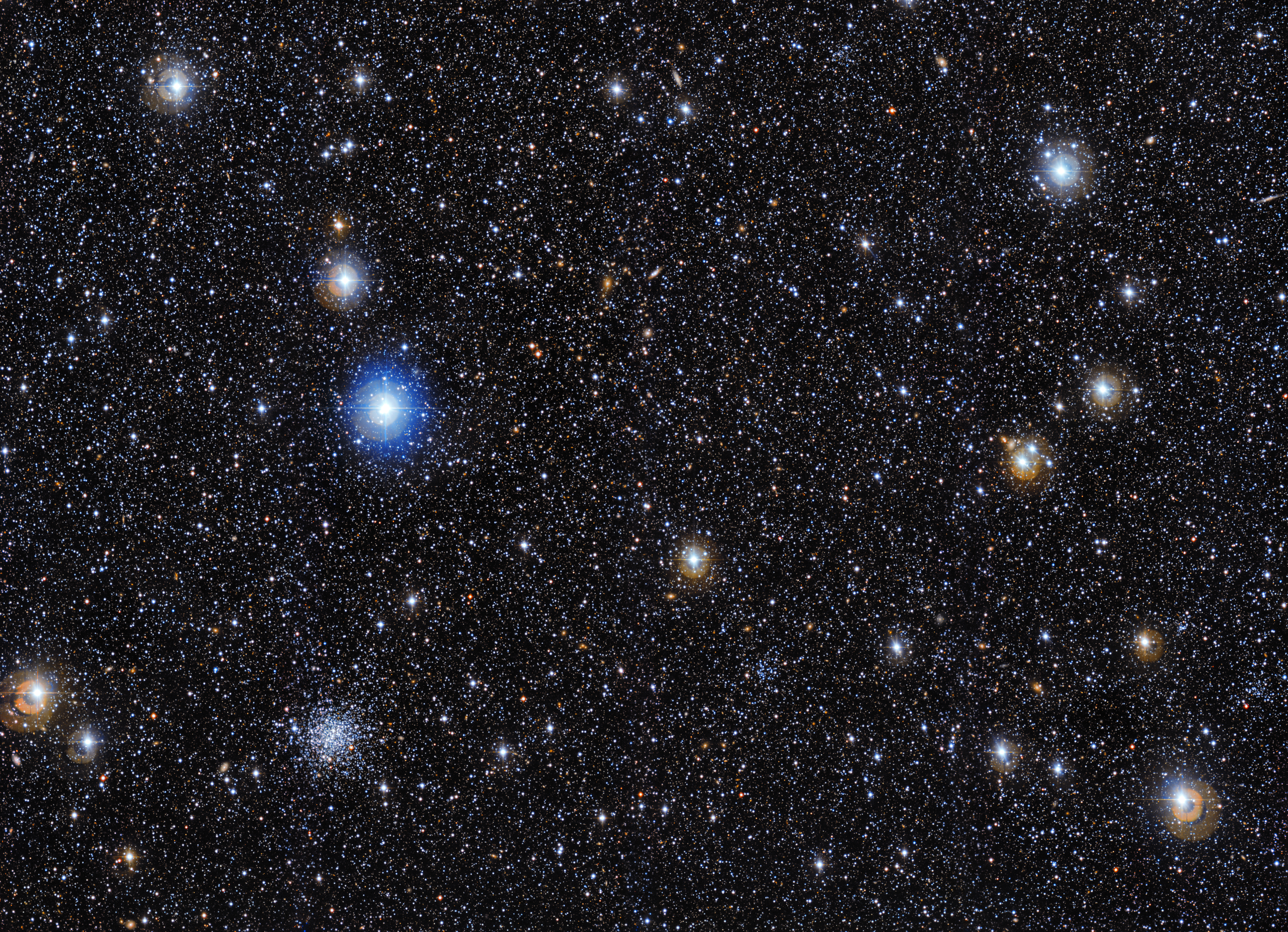
Galaxy clusters are the largest known gravitationally bound structures in the universe.

The gravitational binding energy of a system is the minimum energy which must be added to it in order for the system to cease being in a gravitationally bound state. A gravitationally bound system has a lower (i.e., more negative) gravitational potential energy than the sum of the energies of its parts when these are completely separated—this is what keeps the system aggregated in accordance with the minimum total potential energy principle.

The gravitational binding energy can be conceptually different within the theories of Newtonian gravity and Albert Einstein's theory of gravity called General Relativity. In Newtonian gravity, the binding energy can be considered to be the linear sum of the interactions between all pairs of microscopic components of the system, while in General Relativity, this is only approximately true if the gravitational fields are all weak. When stronger fields are present within a system, the binding energy is a nonlinear property of the entire system, and it cannot be conceptually attributed among the elements of the system. In this case the binding energy can be considered to be the (negative) difference between the ADM mass of the system, as it is manifest in its gravitational interaction with other distant systems, and the sum of the energies of all the atoms and other elementary particles of the system if disassembled.

For a spherical body of uniform density, the gravitational binding energy U is given in Newtonian gravity by the formula

$$U = -\frac{3GM^2}{5R}$$
where G is the gravitational constant, M is the mass of the sphere, and R is its radius.

Assuming that the Earth is a sphere of uniform density (which it is not, but is close enough to get an order-of-magnitude estimate) with M = 5.97×10^{24} kg and r = 6.37×10^{6} m, then U = 2.24×10^{32} J. This is roughly equal to one week of the Sun's total energy output. It is 37.5 MJ/kg, 60% of the absolute value of the potential energy per kilogram at the surface.

The actual depth-dependence of density, inferred from seismic travel times (see Adams–Williamson equation), is given in the Preliminary Reference Earth Model (PREM). Using this, the real gravitational binding energy of Earth can be calculated numerically as U = 2.49×10^{32} J.

According to the virial theorem, the gravitational binding energy of a star is about two times its internal thermal energy in order for hydrostatic equilibrium to be maintained. As the gas in a star becomes more relativistic, the gravitational binding energy required for hydrostatic equilibrium approaches zero and the star becomes unstable (highly sensitive to perturbations), which may lead to a supernova in the case of a high-mass star due to strong radiation pressure or to a black hole in the case of a neutron star.

== Derivation within Newtonian gravity for a uniform sphere ==
The gravitational binding energy of a sphere with radius $R$ is found by imagining that it is pulled apart by successively moving spherical shells to infinity, the outermost first, and finding the total energy needed for that.

Assuming a constant density $\rho$, the masses of a shell and the sphere inside it are:
$$m_\mathrm{shell} = 4\pi r^{2}\rho\,dr$$
and
$$m_\mathrm{interior} = \frac{4}{3}\pi r^3 \rho$$

The required energy for a shell is the negative of the gravitational potential energy:
$$dU = -G\frac{m_\mathrm{shell} m_\mathrm{interior}}{r}$$

Integrating over all shells yields:
$$U = -G\int_0^R {\frac{\left(4\pi r^2\rho\right)\left(\tfrac{4}{3}\pi r^{3}\rho\right)}{r}} dr = -G{\frac{16}{3}}\pi^2 \rho^2 \int_0^R {r^4} dr = -G{\frac{16}{15}}{\pi}^2{\rho}^2 R^5$$

Since $\rho$ is simply equal to the mass of the whole divided by its volume for objects with uniform density, therefore

$$\rho=\frac{M}{\frac{4}{3}\pi R^3}$$

And finally, plugging this into our result leads to
$$U = -G\frac{16}{15} \pi^2 R^5 \left(\frac{M}{\frac{4}{3}\pi R^3}\right)^2 = -\frac{3GM^2}{5R}$$

Gravitational binding energy

$U = -\frac{3GM^2}{5R}$

== Mass-energy of bound systems ==
By mass-energy equivalence, the negative gravitational potential energy of a bound system reduces the total mass of the system which in turn produces a correspondingly weaker force of attraction between the system and distant masses than if the constituent particles of the system were spread over a large volume. This difference is the gravitational mass defect of the system.

$$\Delta m = \frac{|U|}{c^2},$$

which for a sphere of uniform density is

$$\Delta m = \frac{3GM^2}{5Rc^2}.$$

For example, the Earth's binding energy, 2.49×10^{32} J calculated by the preliminary Earth reference model has a corresponding mass defect of 2.77×10^{15} kg, which is about 0.0000000464% of the Earth's current mass. If the Earth's components were dispersed over an arbitrarily large volume, the mass of this system would exceed the Earth's current mass by this amount.

In general relativity, the mass of an isolated system measured through its gravitational influence on distant bodies is its ADM mass, and the mass defect is the difference between the ADM mass and the summed energies of the system's constituents at infinite separation. The positive energy theorem guarantees that the ADM mass of an isolated system satisfying the dominant energy condition is non-negative, so the mass defect of a physical system cannot exceed the total rest mass of its constituents.

=== Binding energy of neutron stars ===
For ordinary planets and stars the mass defect is a negligible fraction of the total mass, but for neutron stars it reaches on the order of 10% and depends on the equation of state of dense matter. Lattimer and Prakash give the approximate equation-of-state-independent relation

$$\frac{\Delta m}{M} \approx \frac{0.6\,\beta}{1 - 0.5\,\beta}, \qquad \beta = \frac{GM}{Rc^2},$$

where $\Delta m$ is the mass defect due to the binding energy, M is the star's observed gravitational mass, and R its radius. For a typical neutron star with M = 1.4 M_{☉} and R = 12 km, this gives a binding energy of roughly 15% of the gravitational mass.

== Non-uniform spheres ==
Planets and stars have radial density gradients from their lower density surfaces to their much denser compressed cores. Degenerate matter objects (white dwarfs; neutron star pulsars) have radial density gradients plus relativistic corrections.

Neutron star relativistic equations of state include a graph of radius vs. mass for various models. The most likely radii for a given neutron star mass are bracketed by models AP4 (smallest radius) and MS2 (largest radius). BE is the ratio of gravitational binding energy mass equivalent to observed neutron star gravitational mass of M with radius R,
$$BE = \frac{0.60\,\beta}{1 - \frac{\beta}{2}}$$
$$\beta = \frac{G M}{R c^2} .$$

Given current values

- $G = 6.6743\times10^{-11}\, \mathrm{m^3 \cdot kg^{-1} \cdot s^{-2}}$
- $c^2 = 8.98755\times10^{16}\, \mathrm{m^2 \cdot s^{-2}}$
- $M_\odot = 1.98844\times10^{30}\, \mathrm{kg}$

and the star mass M expressed relative to the solar mass,
$$M_x = \frac{M}{M_\odot} ,$$

then the relativistic fractional binding energy of a neutron star is

$$BE = \frac{885.975\,M_x}{R - 738.313\,M_x}$$

== See also ==
- Stress–energy tensor
- Stress–energy–momentum pseudotensor
- Nordtvedt effect
