= Bautz–Morgan classification =

Galaxy cluster classification scheme

The Bautz–Morgan classification was developed in 1970 by Laura P. Bautz and William Wilson Morgan to categorize galaxy clusters based on their morphology. It defines three main types: I, II, and III. Intermediate types (I-II, II-III) are also allowed. A type IV was initially proposed, but later redacted before the final paper was published.

== Classification ==
- A type I cluster is dominated by a bright, supermassive cD galaxy; for example Abell 2029 and Abell 2199.
- A type II cluster contains elliptical galaxies whose brightness relative to the cluster is intermediate to that of type I and type III. The Coma Cluster is an example of a type II.
- A type III cluster has no remarkable members, such as the Virgo Cluster. Type III has two subdivisions, type IIIE and type IIIS
  - Type IIIE clusters do not contain many giant spirals
  - Type IIIS clusters contain many giant spirals
- The deprecated type IV was for clusters whose brightest members were predominantly spirals.

== Examples ==
Example	Type	Notes
Abell 2199	Type I	
Abell S740	Type I-II	
Coma Cluster	Type II	
Abell 1689	Type II-III	
Virgo Cluster	Type III	
	Type IIIS	
	Type IIIE	

== See also ==
- Active galactic nucleus
- Galaxy morphological classification
- List of Abell clusters
- Planet
- Stellar classification
