= Abell catalogue =

Astronomical catalogue of galaxy clusters

- Related media on Commons

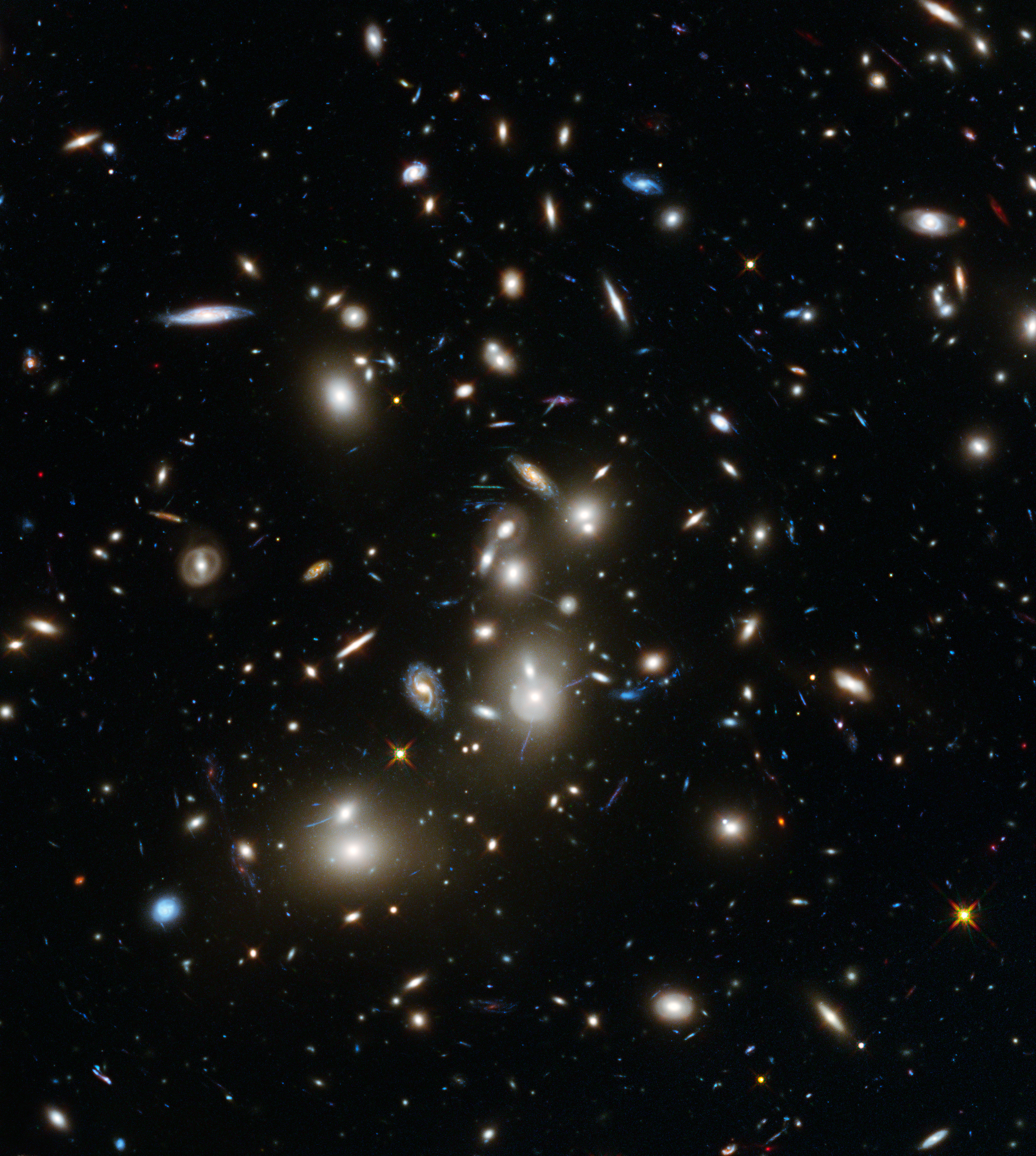
Abell 2744 galaxy cluster – Hubble Frontier Fields view (7 January 2014).

The Abell catalog of rich clusters of galaxies is an all-sky catalog of 4,073 rich galaxy clusters of nominal redshift z ≤ 0.2. This catalog supplements a revision of George O. Abell's original "Northern Survey" of 1958, which had only 2,712 clusters, with a further 1,361 clusters – the "Southern Survey" of 1989, published after Abell's death by co-authors Harold G. Corwin and Ronald P. Olowin from those parts of the south celestial hemisphere that had been omitted from the earlier survey.

The Abell catalog, and especially its clusters, are of interest to amateur astronomers as challenge objects to be viewed in dark locations on large aperture amateur telescopes.

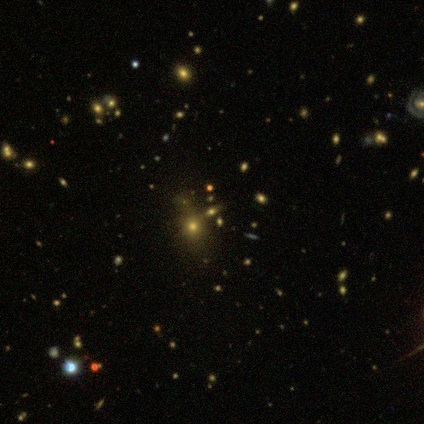
Abell 1132

== Abell Type ==
In the catalog of rich galaxy clusters compiled by George O. Abell, morphological structure is described using an “Abell Type” classification. This system characterizes the overall appearance and degree of symmetry of a galaxy cluster based on visual inspection of photographic plates.

The Abell morphological types are:

- I (Irregular) – Clusters lacking a well-defined center or symmetry, often showing uneven or clumpy galaxy distributions.
- R (Regular) – Clusters with a relatively symmetric, centrally concentrated structure.
- IR / RI (Intermediate) – Clusters exhibiting characteristics between irregular and regular forms.

Additional notation is used to indicate uncertainty or disagreement in classification:

- ":" (colon) – Indicates a mean type derived from estimates differing by two classification steps, or an uncertain type determination.
- "?" (question mark) – Indicates a mean type derived from estimates differing by three classification steps, or a particularly questionable classification.

This morphological designation complements other parameters in the Abell catalog, such as richness and distance class, providing a descriptive measure of cluster structure.

== The Northern Survey ==
The original catalog of 2,712 rich clusters of galaxies was published in 1958 by George O. Abell (1927–1983), who was then studying at the California Institute of Technology. The catalog, which formed part of Abell's PhD thesis, was prepared by means of a visual inspection of the red 103a-E plates of the Palomar Observatory Sky Survey (POSS), for which Abell was one of the principal observers. A. G. Wilson, another of the principal observers, assisted Abell in the initial stages of the survey by routinely inspecting the plates as they were produced. After the completion of the survey, Abell went over the plates again and carried out a more detailed inspection. In both cases inspection was made with a 3.5× magnifying lens.

To qualify for inclusion in the catalog, a cluster had to satisfy four criteria:

- Richness: A cluster must have a minimum population of 50 members within a magnitude range of m_{3} to m_{3}+2 (where m_{3} is the magnitude of the 3rd-brightest member of the cluster). To ensure a healthy margin of error, this criterion was not applied rigorously, and the final catalog included many clusters with fewer than fifty members (though these were excluded from Abell's accompanying statistical study). Abell divided the clusters into six "richness groups", depending on the number of galaxies in a given cluster that lie within the magnitude range m_{3} to m_{3}+2 (the average number of galaxies per cluster for the entire catalog was 64):
  - Group 0: 30–49 galaxies
  - Group 1: 50–79 galaxies
  - Group 2: 80–129 galaxies
  - Group 3: 130–199 galaxies
  - Group 4: 200–299 galaxies
  - Group 5: more than 299 galaxies
- Compactness: A cluster must be sufficiently compact that its fifty or more members lie within one "counting radius" of the cluster's centre. This radius, now known as the "Abell radius", may be defined as 1.72/z arcminutes, where z is the cluster's redshift, or as 1.5h^{−1} Mpc, where the Hubble constant is assumed to beH_{0} = 100 km s^{−1} Mpc^{−1}, and h is a dimensionless scale parameter which usually takes value between 0.5 and 1. h = H_{0}/100. The precise value of the Abell radius depends on the value taken for that parameter h. For h = 0.75 (same as H_{0} = 75 km s^{−1} Mpc^{−1}), the Abell radius is 2 megaparsecs. This is more than twice the estimate Abell gave in 1958, when H_{0} was thought to be as high as 180 km s^{−1} Mpc^{−1}.
- Distance: A cluster should have a nominal redshift of between 0.02 and 0.2 (i.e. a recessional velocity of between 6,000 and 60,000 km/s). Assuming H_{0} = 180 km s^{−1} Mpc^{−1}, these values correspond to distances of about 33 and 330 Mpc respectively; but using today's estimate for H_{0} (about 71 km s^{−1} Mpc^{−1}) Abell's upper and lower limits are actually set at about 85 and 850 Mpc. It has since been shown than many of the clusters in the catalog are more remote even than this, some being as far away as z = 0.4 (about 1,700 Mpc). Abell divided the clusters into seven "distance groups" according to the magnitudes of their tenth-brightest members:
  - Group 1: mag 13.3–14.0
  - Group 2: mag 14.1–14.8
  - Group 3: mag 14.9–15.6
  - Group 4: mag 15.7–16.4
  - Group 5: mag 16.5–17.2
  - Group 6: mag 17.3–18.0
  - Group 7: mag > 18.0
- Galactic latitude: Areas of the sky in the neighbourhood of the Milky Way were excluded from the study because the density of stars in those fields – not to mention interstellar obscuration – made it difficult to positively identify galaxy clusters. Like the richness criterion, this one was not applied rigorously, several clusters in or close to the Galactic Plane being included in the catalog where Abell was satisfied that they were genuine clusters that met the other criteria.

In the catalog as originally published the clusters were listed in increasing order of right ascension. Equatorial coordinates (right ascension and declination) were given for the equinox of 1855 (the epoch of the Bonner Durchmusterung) and galactic coordinates for 1900.

Also listed for each cluster were the following:

- the cluster's precession rate
- the magnitude of the cluster's tenth-brightest member
- the distance group of the cluster
- the richness group of the cluster

== The Southern Survey ==
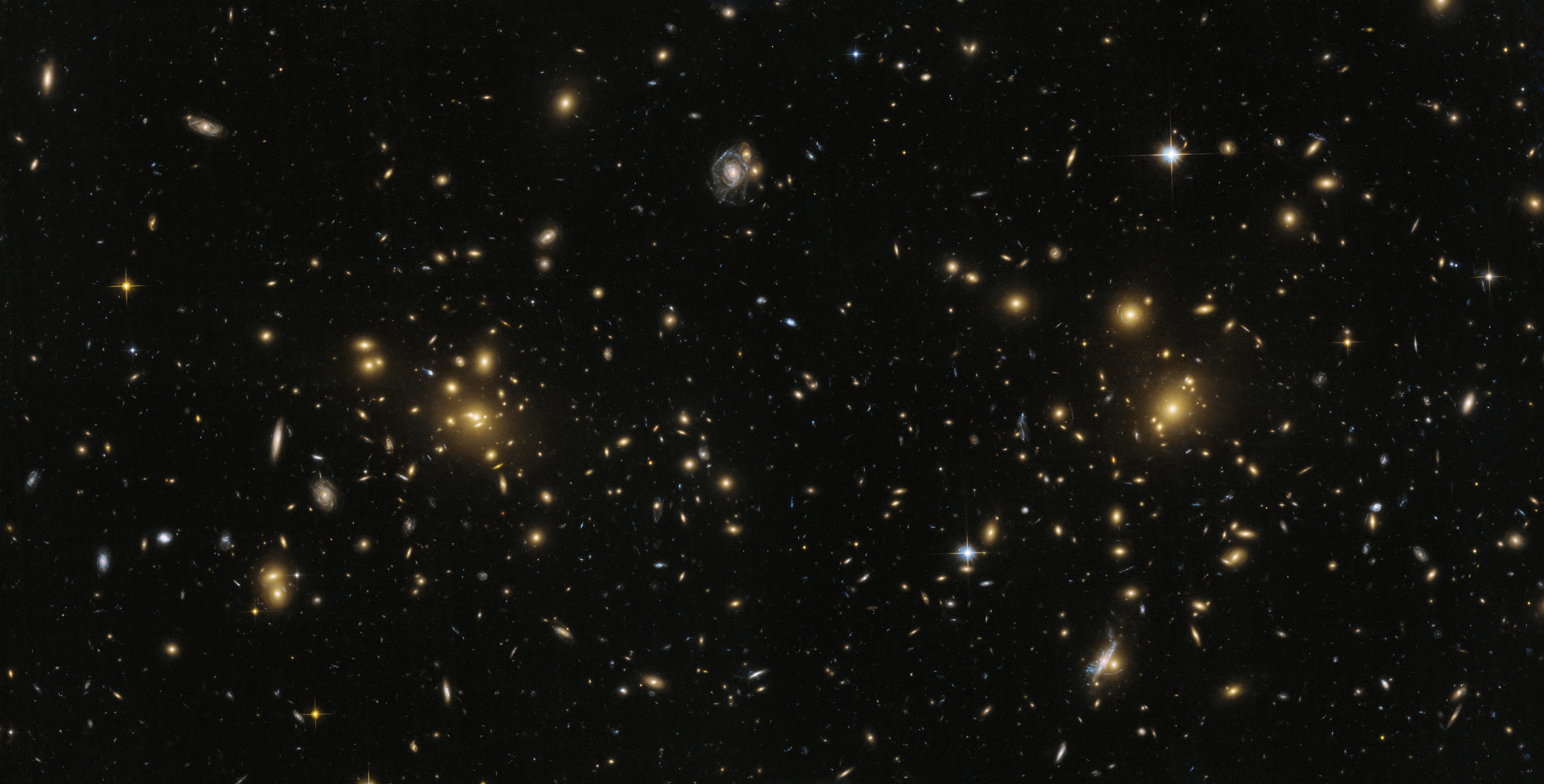
Northern part of galaxy cluster Abell 1758.

The sky-coverage of the 1958 catalog was limited to declinations north of –27°, the original southern limit of POSS. To rectify this and other shortcomings, the original catalog was later revised and supplemented with an additional catalog – the "Southern Survey" – of rich galaxy clusters from those parts of the south celestial hemisphere that had been omitted from the original catalog.

The Southern Survey added a further 1,361 rich clusters to Abell's original Northern Survey. The deep IIIa-J plates of the Southern Sky Survey (SSS) were used in the survey. These photographic plates were taken with the United Kingdom's 1.2-metre Schmidt Telescope at Siding Spring Observatory, Australia, in the 1970s. Abell began the survey during a sabbatical year in Edinburgh in 1976. There he enlisted the assistance of Harold G Corwin of the University of Edinburgh, who continued to work on the catalog until 1981, at which time he joined the Department of Astronomy at the University of Texas. By then about half the survey had been completed. An interim paper on the Southern Survey was read at a symposium in 1983, about one month before Abell's death; the catalog was completed by Ronald P Olowin of the University of Oklahoma, and published in 1989.

Abell and Corwin worked from original plates stored at the Royal Observatory in Edinburgh, scanning the plates visually with a 3x wide-angle magnifier; Olowin used high-quality film copies, which he scanned both visually with a 7x magnifying lens and automatically with a backlit digitizer.

The criteria for inclusion in Abell's Northern Survey were retained, as were Abell's "richness" and "distance" classifications – but with the distance classes now being defined in terms of redshift rather than magnitude. As before, clusters were included if they had at least thirty bright galaxies, as it was estimated that this would all but eliminate the possibility of genuinely rich clusters (i.e. clusters with at least fifty bright members) being omitted. The Southern Survey retains the system of designation devised by Abell for his original catalog, with the numbers running from 2713 to 4076. (The catalog contains three duplicate entries: A3208 = A3207, A3833 = A3832, and A3897 = A2462.) The equatorial co-ordinates are for the equinoxes 1950 and 2000, while the galactic co-ordinates are calculated from the 1950 equatorial co-ordinates.

Abell's original catalog – revised, corrected and updated – was included in the 1989 paper, as was the Abell Supplement, a supplementary catalog of 1,174 clusters from the Southern Survey which were not rich enough or were too distant to be included in the main catalog.

== Format ==
The standard format used to refer to Abell clusters is: Abell X, where X = 1 to 4076. E.g. Abell 1656.

Alternative formats include: ABCG 1656; AC 1656; ACO 1656; A 1656, and A1656. Abell himself preferred the latter, but in recent years ACO 1656 has become the preferred format among professional astronomers and is the one recommended by the Centre de Données astronomiques de Strasbourg (see SIMBAD).

== Members ==
Some notable members of Abell's catalog include:

- Abell S373, the Fornax Cluster
- Abell 426, the Perseus Cluster
- Abell 1367, the Leo Cluster
- Abell 1656, the Coma Cluster
- Abell 2151, the Hercules Cluster
- Abell 2744, Pandora's Cluster
- Abell 3526, the Centaurus Cluster

About 10% of Abell clusters at redshift z < 0.1 are not genuine rich clusters but, rather, the result of the superposition of sparser groupings. The extremely large and extremely rich Virgo Cluster was excluded from the Abell catalog because it covered too large an area of the sky to appear on a single photographic plate.

== See also ==
- Catalogue of Galaxies and of Clusters of Galaxies
- Hickson Compact Group
- List of galaxy groups and clusters
