= Spiral galaxy =

Class of galaxy that has spiral structures extending from their cores

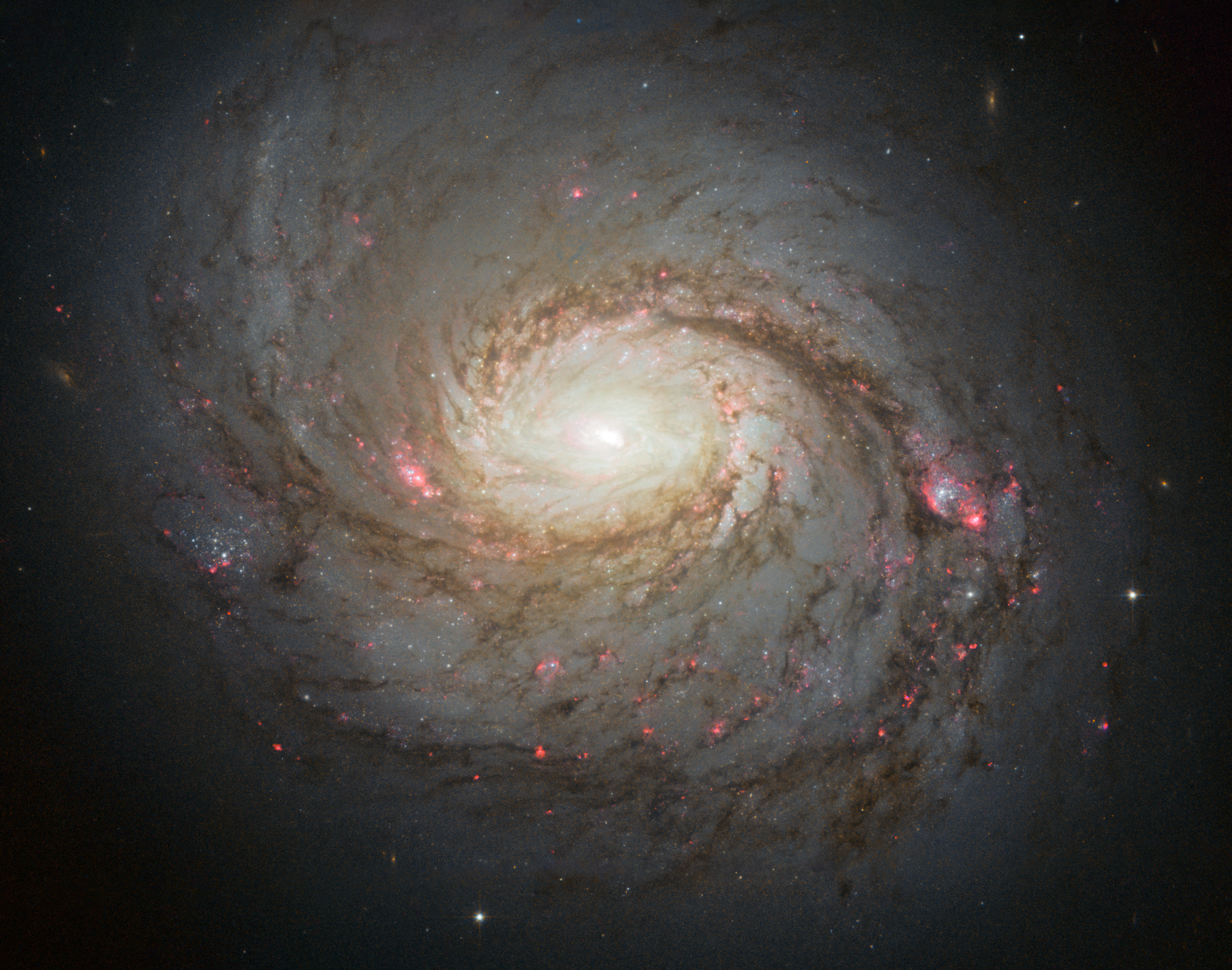
An example of a spiral galaxy, Messier 77 (also known as NGC 1068)

Spiral galaxies form a class of galaxy originally described by Edwin Hubble in his 1936 work The Realm of the Nebulae and, as such, form part of the Hubble sequence. Most spiral galaxies consist of a flat, rotating disk containing stars, gas and dust, and a central concentration of stars known as the bulge. These are often surrounded by a much fainter halo of stars, many of which reside in globular clusters.

Spiral galaxies are named by their spiral structures that extend from the center into the galactic disk. The spiral arms are sites of ongoing star formation and are brighter than the surrounding disc because of the young, hot OB stars that inhabit them.

Roughly two-thirds of all spirals are observed to have an additional component in the form of a bar-like structure, extending from the central bulge, at the ends of which the spiral arms begin. The proportion of barred spirals relative to barless spirals has likely changed over the history of the universe, with only about 10% containing bars about 8 billion years ago, to roughly a quarter 2.5 billion years ago, until present, where over two-thirds of the galaxies in the visible universe (Hubble volume) have bars.

The Milky Way is a barred spiral, although the bar itself is difficult to observe from Earth's current position within the galactic disc. The most convincing evidence for the stars forming a bar in the Galactic Center comes from several recent surveys, including the Spitzer Space Telescope.

Together with irregular galaxies, spiral galaxies make up approximately 60% of galaxies in today's universe. They are mostly found in low-density regions and are rare in the centers of galaxy clusters.

== Structure ==
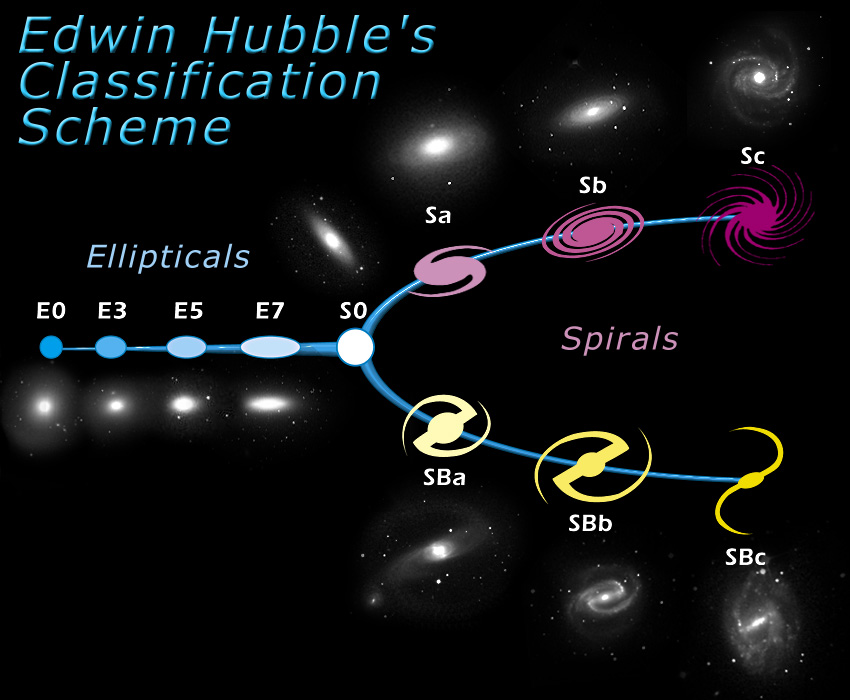
Tuning-fork-style diagram of the Hubble sequence

Spiral galaxies may consist of several distinct components:

- A rotating disc of stars and interstellar matter of which spiral arms are prominent components
- A relatively flat discs with a thickness to diameter ratio around 0.2,
- A central stellar bulge of mainly older stars, which resembles an elliptical galaxy
- A bar-shaped distribution of stars
- A near-spherical halo of stars, including many in globular clusters
- A supermassive black hole at the very center of the bulge
- A near-spherical dark matter halo

The relative importance, in terms of mass, brightness and size, of the different components varies from galaxy to galaxy.

=== Spiral arms ===
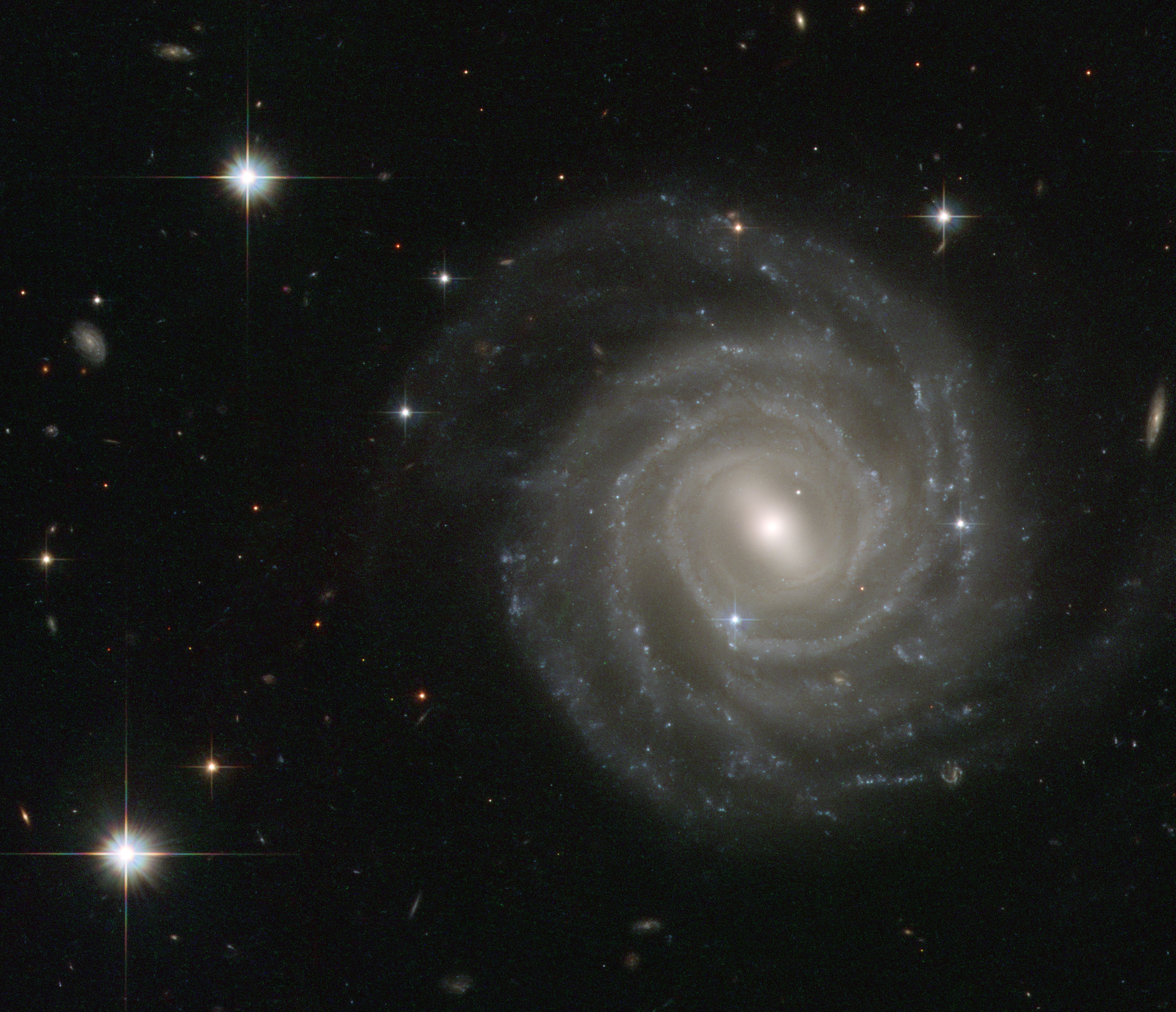
Barred spiral galaxy UGC 12158

Spiral arms are regions of stars that extend from the center of barred and unbarred spiral galaxies. These long, thin regions resemble a spiral and thus give spiral galaxies their name. Naturally, different classifications of spiral galaxies have distinct arm-structures. Sc and SBc galaxies, for instance, have very "loose" arms, whereas Sa and SBa galaxies have tightly wrapped arms (with reference to the Hubble sequence). Either way, spiral arms contain many young, blue stars (due to the high mass density and the high rate of star formation), which make the arms so bright.

=== Bulge ===
A bulge is a large, tightly packed group of stars. The term refers to the central group of star(s) found in most spiral galaxies, often defined as the excess of stellar light above the inward extrapolation of the outer (exponential) disk light.

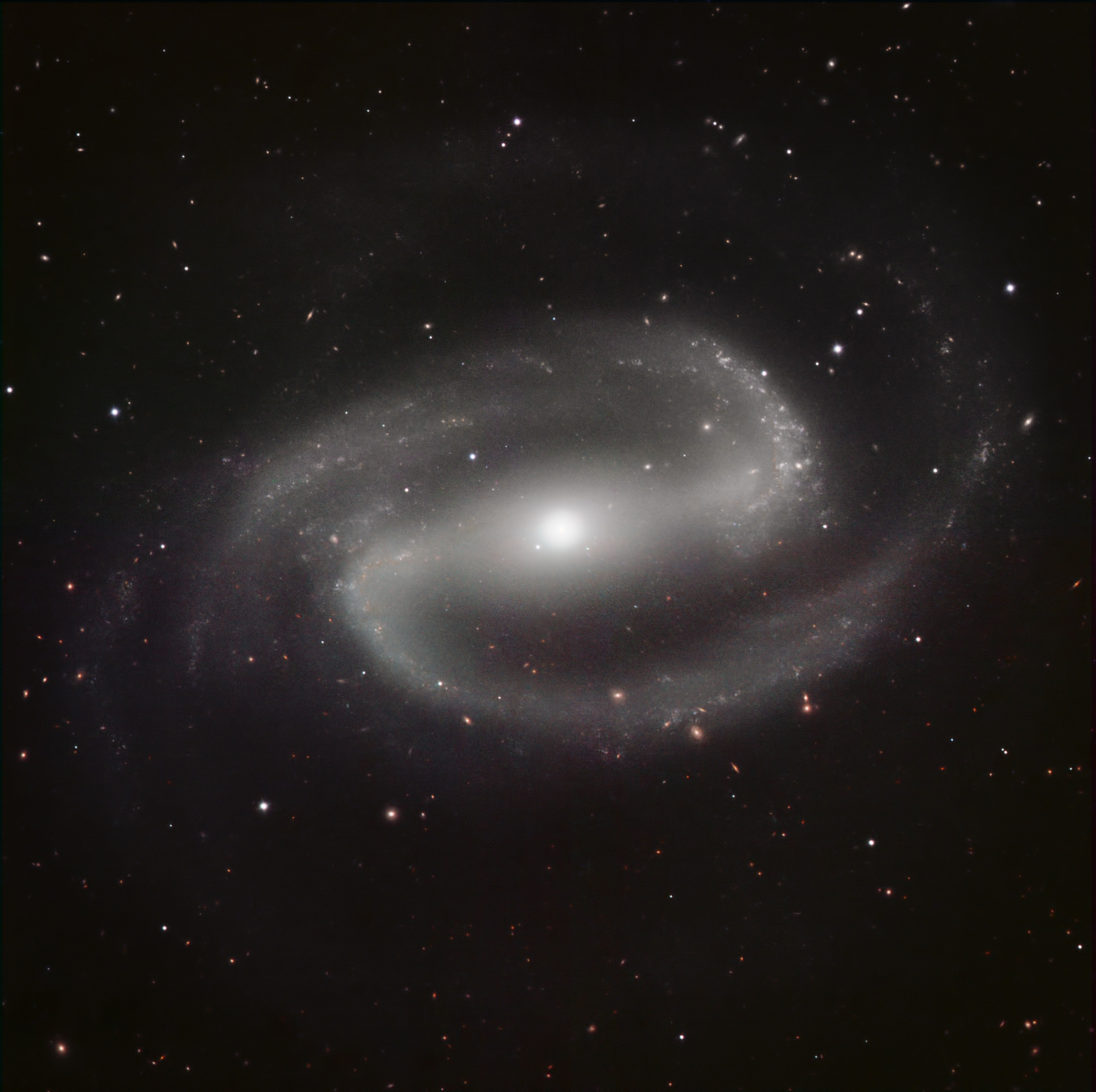
NGC 1300 in infrared light

Using the Hubble classification, the bulge of Sa galaxies is usually composed of Population II stars, which are old, red stars with low metal content. Further, the bulge of Sa and SBa galaxies tends to be large. In contrast, the bulges of Sc and SBc galaxies are much smaller and are composed of young, blue Population I stars. Some bulges have similar properties to those of elliptical galaxies (scaled down to lower mass and luminosity); others simply appear as higher density centers of disks, with properties similar to disk galaxies.

Many bulges are thought to host a supermassive black hole at their centers. In our own galaxy, for instance, the object called Sagittarius A* is a supermassive black hole. There are many lines of evidence for the existence of black holes in spiral galaxy centers, including the presence of active nuclei in some spiral galaxies, and dynamical measurements that find large compact central masses in galaxies such as Messier 106.

=== Bar ===
Bar-shaped elongations of stars are observed in roughly two-thirds of all spiral galaxies. Their presence may be either strong or weak. In edge-on spiral (and lenticular) galaxies, the presence of the bar can sometimes be discerned by the out-of-plane X-shaped or (peanut shell)-shaped structures which typically have a maximum visibility at half the length of the in-plane bar.

=== Spheroid ===
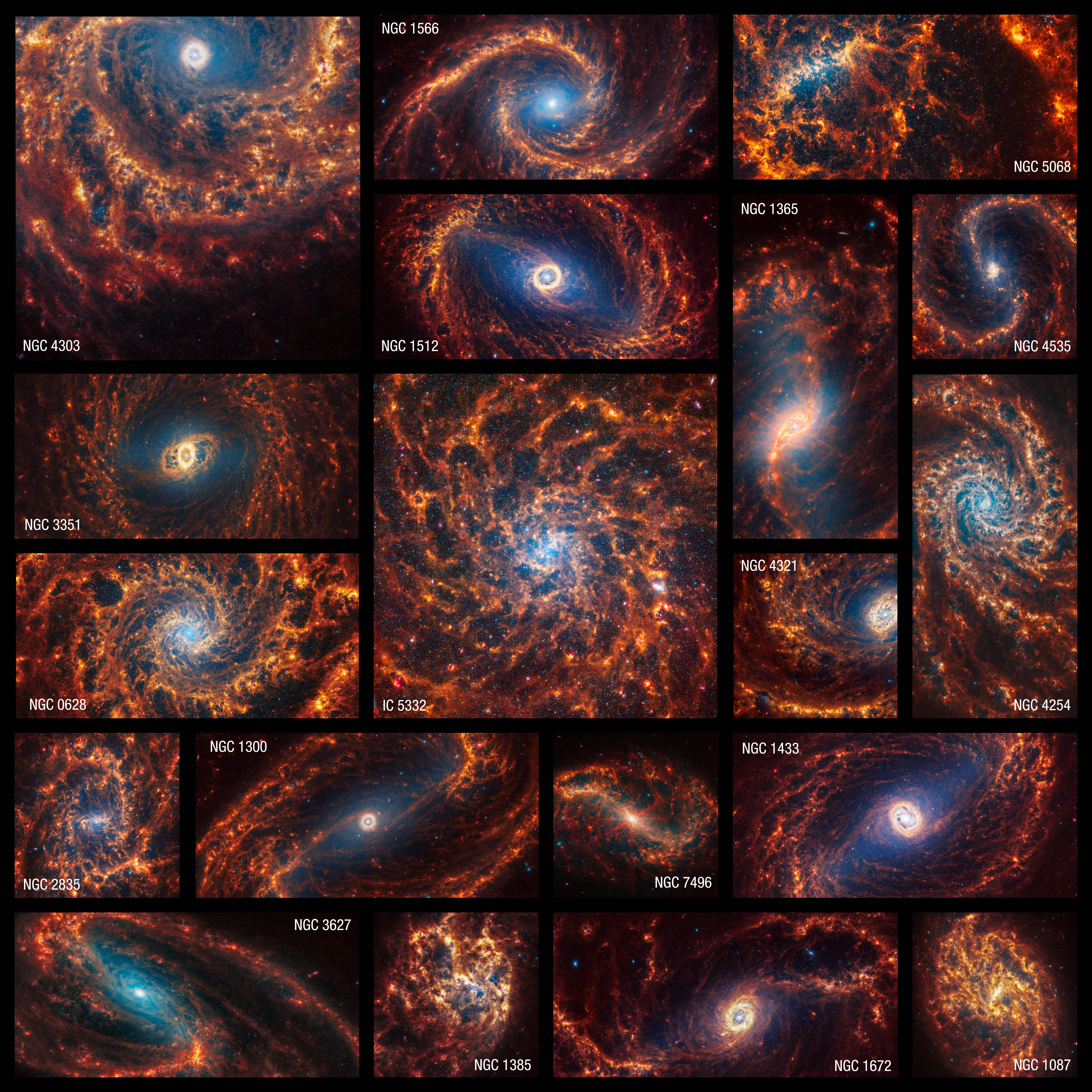
19 face-on spiral galaxies from the James Webb Space Telescope in near- and mid-infrared light. Older stars appear blue here, and are clustered at the galaxies’ cores. Glowing dust, showing where it exists around and between stars – appearing in shades of red and orange. Stars that have not yet fully formed and are encased in gas and dust appear bright red.

The bulk of the stars in a spiral galaxy are located either close to a single plane (the galactic plane) in more or less conventional circular orbits around the center of the galaxy (the Galactic Center), or in a spheroidal galactic bulge around the galactic core.

However, some stars inhabit a spheroidal halo or galactic spheroid, a type of galactic halo. The orbital behaviour of these stars is disputed, but they may exhibit retrograde and/or highly inclined orbits, or not move in regular orbits at all. Halo stars may be acquired from small galaxies which fall into and merge with the spiral galaxy—for example, the Sagittarius Dwarf Spheroidal Galaxy is in the process of merging with the Milky Way and observations show that some stars in the halo of the Milky Way have been acquired from it.

Unlike the galactic disc, the halo seems to be free of dust, and in further contrast, stars in the galactic halo are of Population II, much older and with much lower metallicity than their Population I cousins in the galactic disc (but similar to those in the galactic bulge). The galactic halo also contains many globular clusters.

The motion of halo stars does bring them through the disc on occasion, and a number of small red dwarfs close to the Sun are thought to belong to the galactic halo, for example Kapteyn's Star and Groombridge 1830. Due to their irregular movement around the center of the galaxy, these stars often display unusually high proper motion.

=== Oldest spiral galaxies ===
BRI 1335-0417 is the oldest and most distant known spiral galaxy, as of 2024. The galaxy has a redshift of 4.4, meaning its light took 12.4 billion years to reach Earth. Another contender for this title is the galaxy Zhúlóng, which according to one paper has an estimated redshift of 5.2.

The oldest grand design spiral galaxy on file is BX442. At eleven billion years old, it is more than two billion years older than any previous discovery. Researchers believe the galaxy's shape is caused by the gravitational influence of a companion dwarf galaxy. Computer models based on that assumption indicate that BX442's spiral structure will last about 100 million years.

The oldest multi-arm spiral galaxy, as of 2022, is A2744-DSG-z3. Its redshift is z=3.059, which corresponds to 11.5 billion light years to Earth.

A1689B11 is an extremely old spiral galaxy located in the Abell 1689 galaxy cluster in the constellation Virgo. A1689B11 is 11 billion light years from the Earth, forming 2.6 billion years after the Big Bang.

=== Related ===
In June 2019, citizen scientists through Galaxy Zoo reported that the usual Hubble classification, particularly concerning spiral galaxies, may not be supported, and may need updating.

== Origin of the spiral structure ==
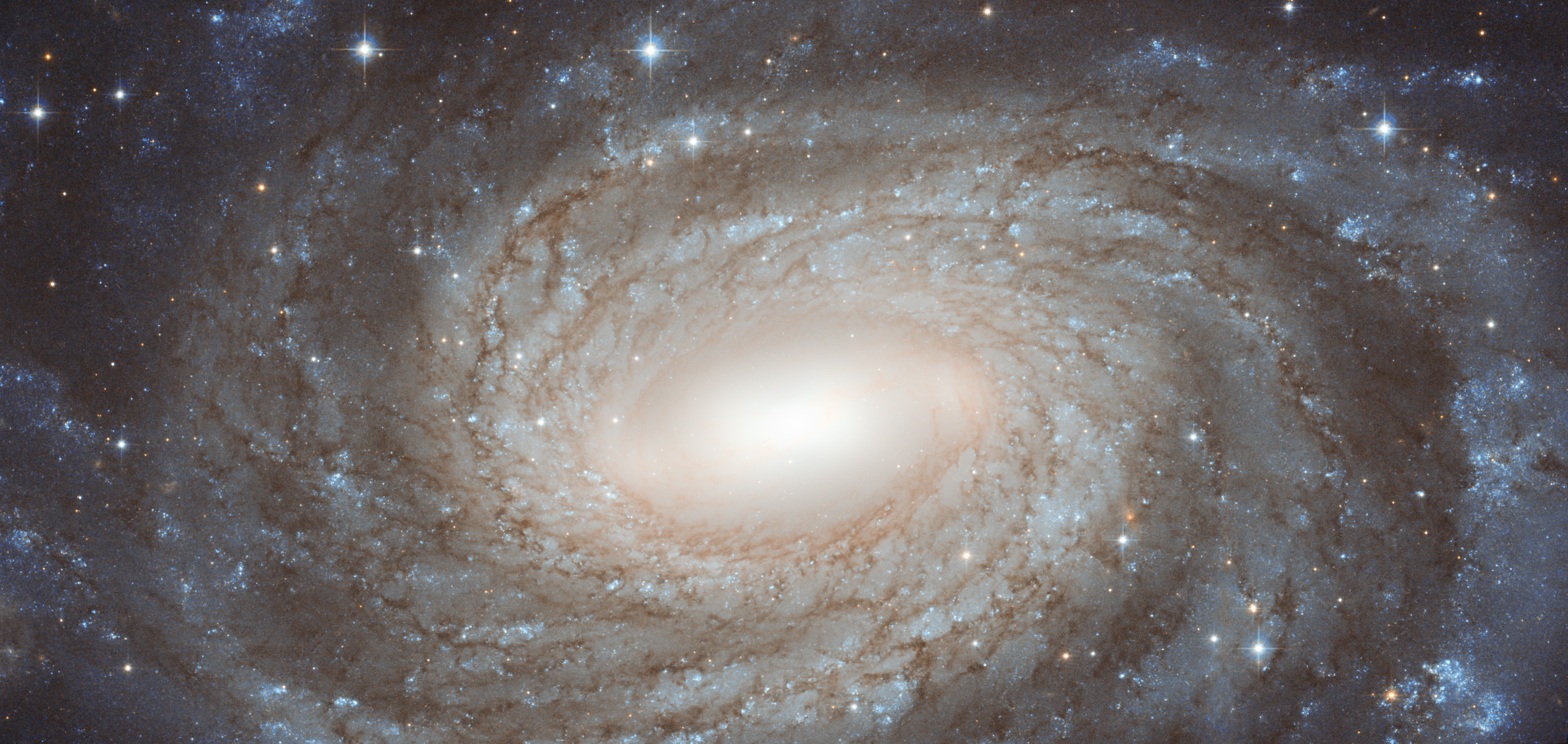
Spiral galaxy NGC 6384 taken by Hubble Space Telescope

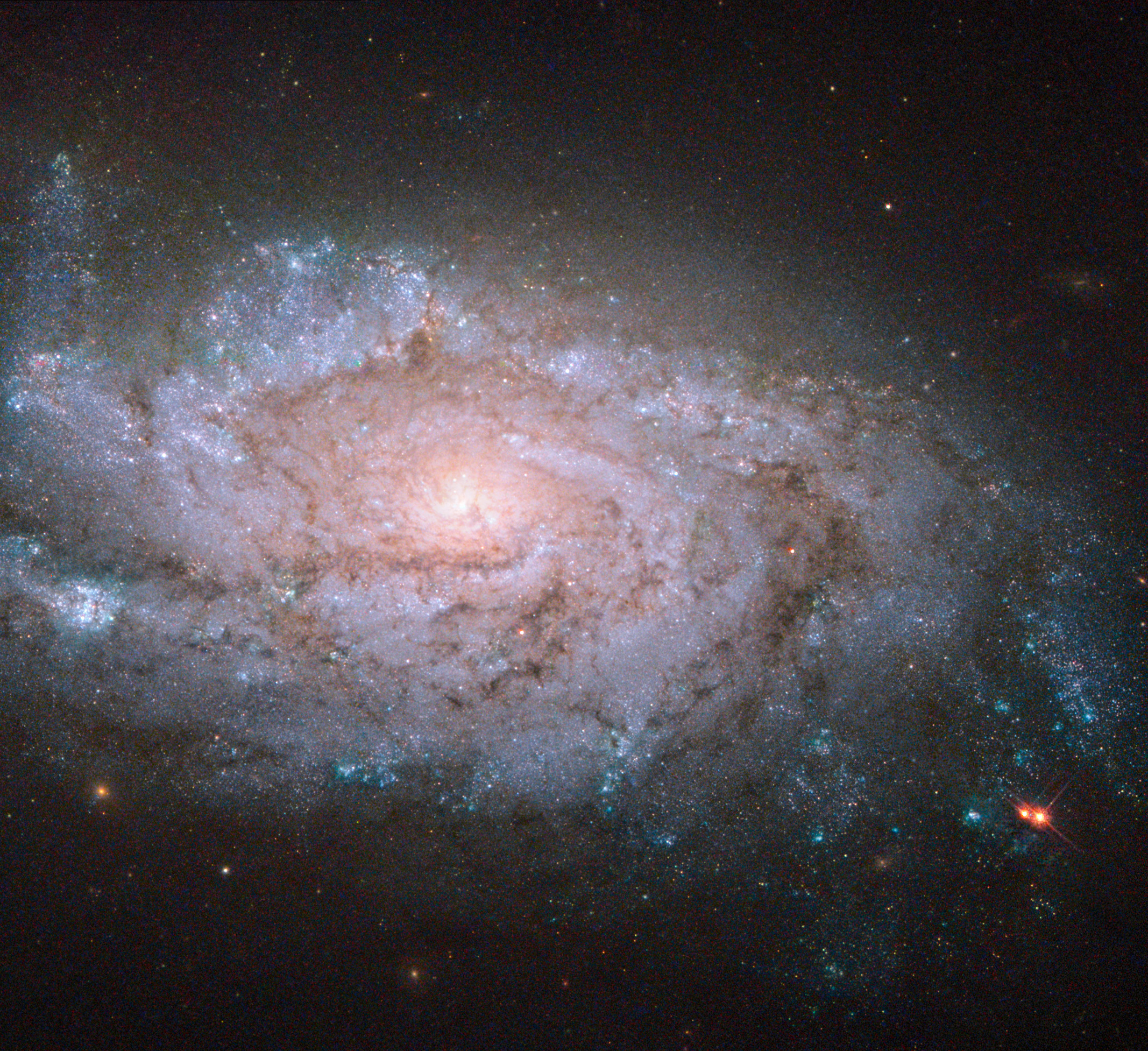
The spiral galaxy NGC 1084, home of five supernovae

=== History ===
The pioneer of studies of the rotation of the Galaxy and the formation of the spiral arms was Bertil Lindblad in 1925. He realized that the idea of stars arranged permanently in a spiral shape was untenable. Since the angular speed of rotation of the galactic disk varies with distance from the centre of the galaxy (via a standard solar system type of gravitational model), a radial arm (like a spoke) would quickly become curved as the galaxy rotates. The arm would, after a few galactic rotations, become increasingly curved and wind around the galaxy ever tighter. This is called the winding problem. Measurements in the late 1960s showed that the orbital velocity of stars in spiral galaxies with respect to their distance from the galactic center is indeed higher than expected from Newtonian dynamics but still cannot explain the stability of the spiral structure.

Since the 1970s, there have been two leading hypotheses or models for the spiral structures of galaxies:

- star formation caused by density waves in the galactic disk of the galaxy.
- the stochastic self-propagating star formation model (SSPSF model) – star formation caused by shock waves in the interstellar medium. The shock waves are caused by the stellar winds and supernovae from recent previous star formation, leading to self-propagating and self-sustaining star formation. Spiral structure then arises from differential rotation of the galaxy's disk.

These different hypotheses are not mutually exclusive, as they may explain different types of spiral arms.

=== Density wave model ===
Animation of orbits as predicted by the density wave theory, which explains the existence of stable spiral arms. Stars move in and out of the spiral arms as they orbit the galaxy.

Bertil Lindblad proposed that the arms represent regions of enhanced density (density waves) that rotate more slowly than the galaxy's stars and gas. As gas enters a density wave, it gets squeezed and makes new stars, some of which are short-lived blue stars that light the arms.

==== Historical theory of Lin and Shu ====
Exaggerated diagram illustrating Lin and Shu's explanation of spiral arms in terms of slightly elliptical orbits

The first acceptable theory for the spiral structure was devised by C. C. Lin and Frank Shu in 1964, attempting to explain the large-scale structure of spirals in terms of a small-amplitude wave propagating with fixed angular velocity, that revolves around the galaxy at a speed different from that of the galaxy's gas and stars. They suggested that the spiral arms were manifestations of spiral density waves – they assumed that the stars travel in slightly elliptical orbits, and that the orientations of their orbits is correlated i.e. the ellipses vary in their orientation (one to another) in a smooth way with increasing distance from the galactic center. This is illustrated in the diagram to the right. It is clear that the elliptical orbits come close together in certain areas to give the effect of arms. Stars therefore do not remain forever in the position that we now see them in, but pass through the arms as they travel in their orbits.

==== Star formation caused by density waves ====
The following hypotheses exist for star formation caused by density waves:

- As gas clouds move into the density wave, the local mass density increases. Since the criteria for cloud collapse (the Jeans instability) depends on density, a higher density makes it more likely for clouds to collapse and form stars.
- As the compression wave goes through, it triggers star formation on the leading edge of the spiral arms.
- As clouds get swept up by the spiral arms, they collide with one another and drive shock waves through the gas, which in turn causes the gas to collapse and form stars.

=== More young stars in spiral arms ===
Spiral arms appear visually brighter because they contain both young stars and more massive and luminous stars than the rest of the galaxy. As massive stars evolve far more quickly, their demise tends to leave a darker background of fainter stars immediately behind the density waves. This make the density waves much more prominent.

Spiral arms simply appear to pass through the older established stars as they travel in their galactic orbits, so they also do not necessarily follow the arms. As stars move through an arm, the space velocity of each stellar system is modified by the gravitational force of the local higher density. Also the newly created stars do not remain forever fixed in the position within the spiral arms, where the average space velocity returns to normal after the stars depart on the other side of the arm.

=== Gravitationally aligned orbits ===
Charles Francis and Erik Anderson showed from observations of motions of over 20,000 local stars (within 300 parsecs) that stars do move along spiral arms, and described how mutual gravity between stars causes orbits to align on logarithmic spirals. When the theory is applied to gas, collisions between gas clouds generate the molecular clouds in which new stars form, and evolution towards grand-design bisymmetric spirals is explained.

== Distribution of stars in spirals ==
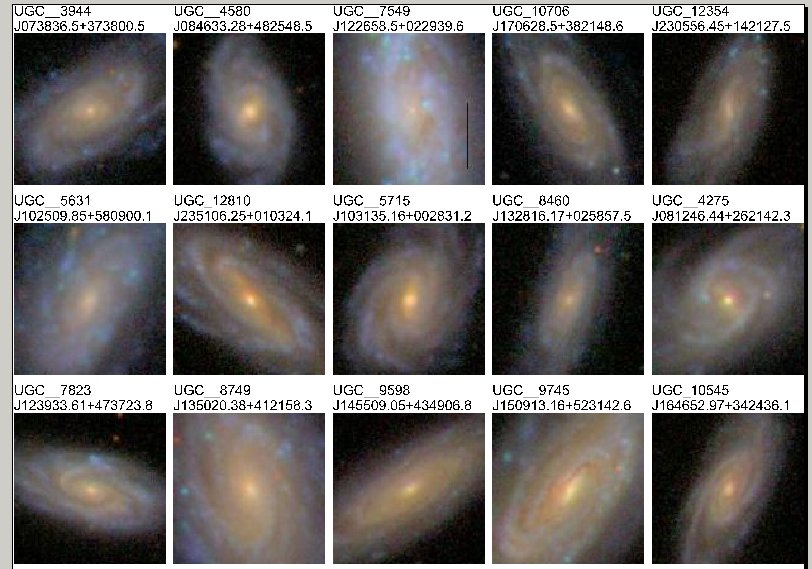
The similar distribution of stars in spirals

The stars in spirals are distributed in thin disks radial with intensity profiles such that

$$I(R) = I_0 e^{-R/h}$$

with $h$ being the disk scale-length; $I_0$ is the central value; it is useful to define: $R_{opt}= 3.2 h$ as the size of the stellar disk, whose luminosity is

$L_{tot} = 2\pi I_0 h^2$.

The spiral galaxies light profiles, in terms of the coordinate $R/h$, do not depend on galaxy luminosity.

== Spiral nebula ==
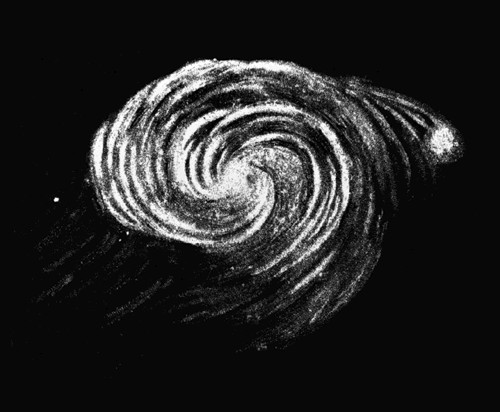
Drawing of the Whirlpool Galaxy by Rosse in 1845

Before it was understood that spiral galaxies existed outside of the Milky Way galaxy, they were often referred to as spiral nebulae, due to Lord Rosse, whose telescope Leviathan was the first to reveal the spiral structure of galaxies. In 1845 he discovered the spiral structure of M51, a galaxy nicknamed later as the "Whirlpool Galaxy", and his drawings of it closely resemble modern photographs. In 1846 and in 1849 Lord Rosse identified similar pattern in Messier 99 and Messier 33 respectively. In 1850 he made the first drawing of Andromeda Galaxy's spiral structure. In 1852 Stephen Alexander supposed that Milky Way is also a spiral nebula.

The question of whether such objects were separate galaxies independent of the Milky Way, or a type of nebula existing within our own galaxy, was the subject of the Great Debate of 1920, between Heber Curtis of Lick Observatory and Harlow Shapley of Mount Wilson Observatory. Beginning in 1923, Edwin Hubble observed Cepheid variables in several spiral nebulae, including the so-called "Andromeda Nebula", proving that they are, in fact, entire galaxies outside our own. The term spiral nebula has since fallen out of use.

== Milky Way ==
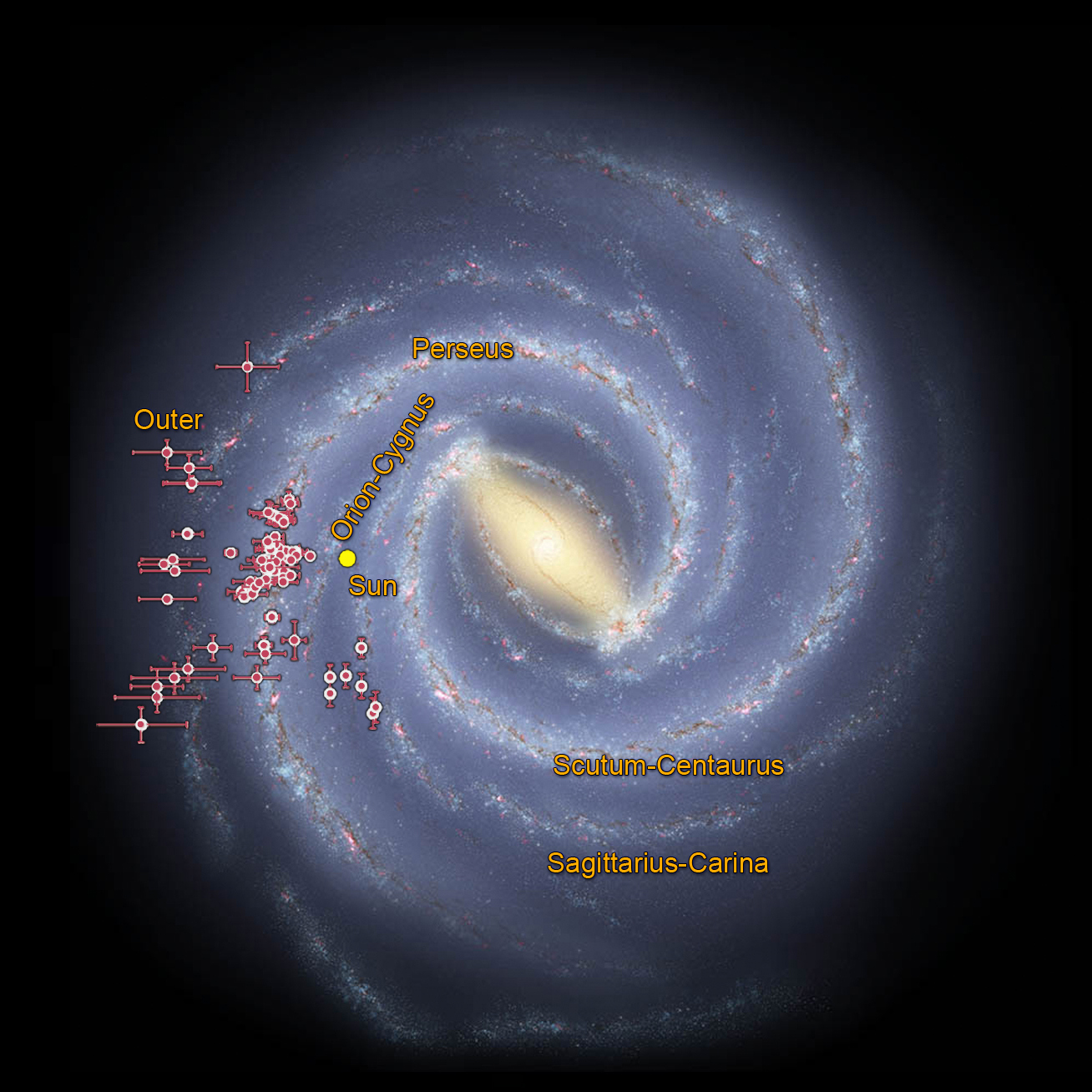
Milky Way Galaxy's spiral arms and barred core – based on WISE data

The Milky Way was once considered an ordinary spiral galaxy. Astronomers first began to suspect that the Milky Way is a barred spiral galaxy in the 1960s. Their suspicions were confirmed by Spitzer Space Telescope observations in 2005, which showed that the Milky Way's central bar is larger than was previously suspected.

== Famous examples ==
- Alaknanda Galaxy – Newly discovered spiral galaxy
- Andromeda Galaxy – Barred spiral galaxy in the Local Group
- Black Eye Galaxy – Spiral galaxy in the constellation Coma Berenices
- Malin 1 – Spiral galaxy in the constellation Coma Berenices
- Milky Way – Galaxy containing the Solar System
- Pinwheel Galaxy – Galaxy in the constellation Ursa Major
- Sunflower Galaxy – Spiral galaxy in the constellation Canes Venatici
- Triangulum Galaxy – Spiral galaxy in the constellation Triangulum
- Whirlpool Galaxy – Galaxy in the constellation Canes Venatici

== See also ==
=== Classification ===
- Disc galaxy – Type of galactic form
- Dwarf elliptical galaxy – Elliptical galaxy smaller than normal ones
- Dwarf spheroidal galaxy – Low-luminosity galaxy of old stars and little dust
- Flocculent spiral galaxy – Patchy galaxy with discontinuous spiral arms
- Galaxy color–magnitude diagram – Chart depicting the relationship between brightness and mass of large star systems
- Grand design spiral galaxy – Spiral galaxy with prominent and well-defined spiral arms
- Intermediate spiral galaxy – Galaxy type intermediate between a spiral galaxy and barred spiral galaxy
- Lenticular galaxy – Class of galaxy between an elliptical galaxy and a spiral galaxy
- Ring galaxy – Galaxy with an annular appearance
- Starburst galaxy – Galaxy undergoing an exceptionally high rate of star formation
- Seyfert galaxy – Class of active galaxies with very bright nuclei

=== Other ===
- Galactic coordinate system – Celestial coordinate system in spherical coordinates, with the Sun as its center
- Galactic corona – Hot, ionised, gaseous component of a galactic halo
- Galaxy formation and evolution – Subfield of cosmology
- Galaxy rotation curve – Observed discrepancy in galactic angular momenta
- Groups and clusters of galaxies – All of space observable from the Earth at the present
- List of galaxies
- List of nearest galaxies
- List of spiral galaxies
- Stellar halo – Star-containing portion of a galactic halo
- Timeline of knowledge about galaxies, clusters of galaxies, and large-scale structure
- Tully–Fisher relation – Correlation between luminosity and emission line width of spiral galaxies
