= Abell 1835 BCG =

Type-cD galaxy in the constellation Virgo

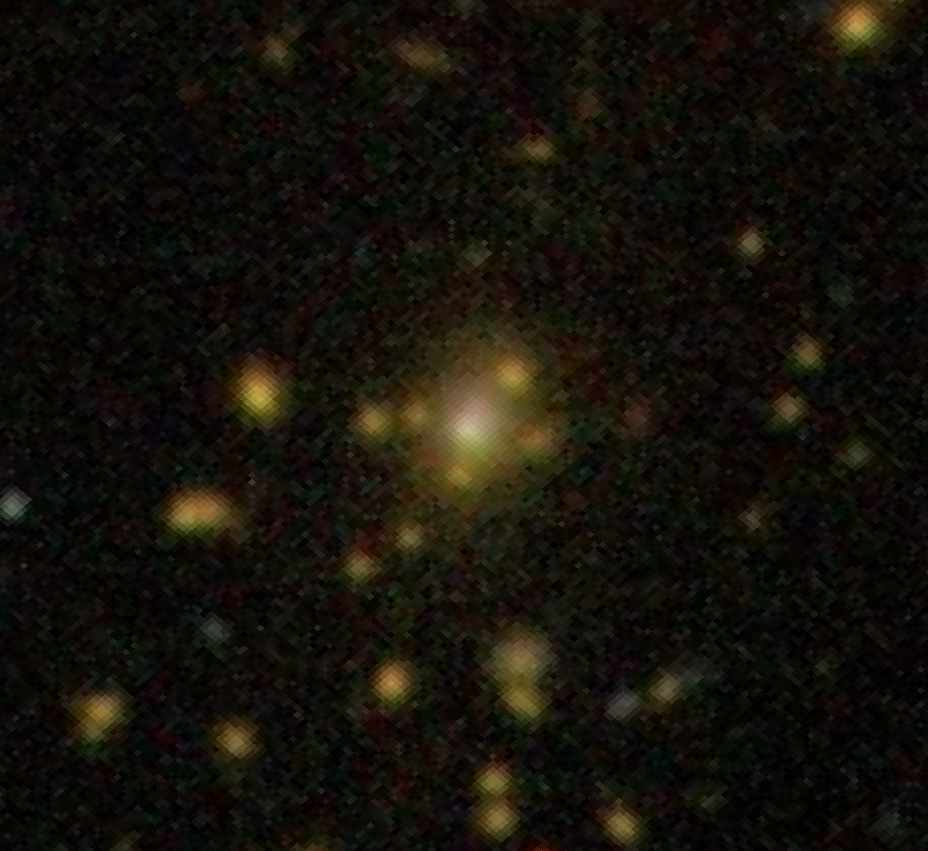
- SDSS image of Abell 1835 BCG

Observation data (J2000.0 epoch)
- Constellation: Virgo
- Right ascension: 14^{h} 01^{m} 02.01^{s}
- Declination: +02° 52′ 43.03″
- Redshift: 0.251958
- Heliocentric radial velocity: 75,535 km/s ± 3
- Distance: 3.006 Gly (921.73 Mpc)
- Group or cluster: Abell 1835
- magnitude (J): 14.04

Characteristics
- Type: cD;BrClG Sbrst
- Size: ~523,200 ly (160.42 kpc) (estimated)

Other designations
- ABELL 1835:[BHB2008] BCG, 2MASX J14010204+0252423, OGC 0034, RX J1401.0+0252:[ZEH2003] 03, SDSS J140102.06+025242.4, SMM J14010+0252 LEDA 3350008

Abell 1835 BCG (short for Abell 1835 Brightest Cluster Galaxy) is a Type-cD galaxy located in the constellation of Virgo. The redshift of the galaxy is (z) 0.25 and it was first discovered by astronomers who were conducting a study of X-ray clusters in 1992. It is the brightest cluster galaxy (BCG) of Abell 1835.

== Description ==
Abell 1835 BCG is a type-cD galaxy dominating the center of Abell 1835. It has also been classified as a luminous infrared galaxy because it is much more luminous compared to the other galaxies in the cluster with the total infrared luminosity of 7.3 ± 1.5 × 10^{11} L_{☉} with the total flux density of 255.6 ± 3.9 mJy. The nucleus of the galaxy is found to be active and it is the one responsible for the creation of two X-ray cavities in the hot gas about 40 million years ago. The radio source of the galaxy has been described as compact and it has a total radio luminosity of 3.55 ± 0.09 × 10^{41} erg s^{−1} between the frequencies of 10 MHz and 10 GHz. There is a radio jet present in the source with a jet power of 1.4 × 10^{45} erg s^{−1}. An evidence found the jet is found to originate from the nucleus, heading initially west before bending in the direction of northwest.

The BCG is found to be categized as a starburst galaxy, that is currently undergoing an intense wave of star formation. Observations showed the first wave of star formation begun around 320 million years ago and that is producing new stars at the rate of 100-180 M_{☉} per year. The star formation has been calculated as 123 M_{☉} per year and it is mainly concentrated in a region located 35 kiloparsecs from the nucleus. The BCG has also been described to have a halo light profile rising above 63 kiloparsecs and central colors that is 1.3 magnitudes bluer compared to the halo. Its central core is found to be blue.

A study published in 2014 has found detections of molecular gas. When observed, it is found to contain about 5 × 10^{10} M_{☉}, mostly associated with star formation in a form of a thick face-on turbulent disk. Evidence also found the BCG displays bipolar molecular outflows that are travelling at velocities between -250 and +480 kilometers per seconds, accelerated outwards by mechanical energy forces that are related to the creation of X-ray bubbles. The central AGN of the BCG has been found to push hot gas with a mass of 4 × 10^{10} M_{☉}, outwards along the axis of the bubble. There are also detections of doubly ionized oxygen both inside and around the galaxy itself. Around half of the flux is being emitted in a region located 7.3 kiloparsecs from the central nucleus. Detections of carbon oxide (3-2) emission have also been found extending a 13.5 kiloparsec radius with three filament features in relative position of the nucleus by around 3.9 kiloparsecs.
