= A1689B11 =

Old and distant spiral galaxy in the constellation Virgo

Observation data (J2000 epoch)
- Constellation: Virgo
- Right ascension: 13^{h} 11^{m} 33.336^{s}
- Declination: −01° 21′ 06.9″
- Redshift: 2.540
- Heliocentric radial velocity: 761,473 km/s (473,157 mi/s)
- Galactocentric velocity: 761,400 km/s (473,100 mi/s)
- Distance: 11 billion ly (3.4 billion pc) (light travel distance); 19.4 billion ly (5.9 billion pc) (comoving distance)
- Apparent magnitude (V): 24

Characteristics
- Type: S
- Mass: 10^{10.2} (dynamical); 10^{9.8 ± 0.3} (stellar) M_{☉}
- Apparent size (V): 5200 pc (17 kly)
- Half-light radius (physical): 2600 ± 700 pc

Other designations
- BBC2005 11.1, [BBC2005] Source 11

A1689B11 is an extremely old spiral galaxy located in the Abell 1689 galaxy cluster in the constellation Virgo about 11 billion light years from Earth. The disk of A1689B11 is cool and thin, yet it produced stars at thirty times the rate of the Milky Way. With a lookback time (the difference between the age of the universe now and the age of the universe at the time light left the galaxy) of 11 billion years in the concordance cosmology, A1689B11 is forming 2.6 billion years after the Big Bang. And its present comoving distance is about 19.4 billion light-years from the Earth. It is one of the most distant known spiral galaxies as of 2017.

== See also ==
- BX442, another old and distant spiral galaxy
- BRI 1335-0417, another old and distant spiral galaxy
