= Abell 1835 IR1916 =

Distant galaxy in the constellation Virgo

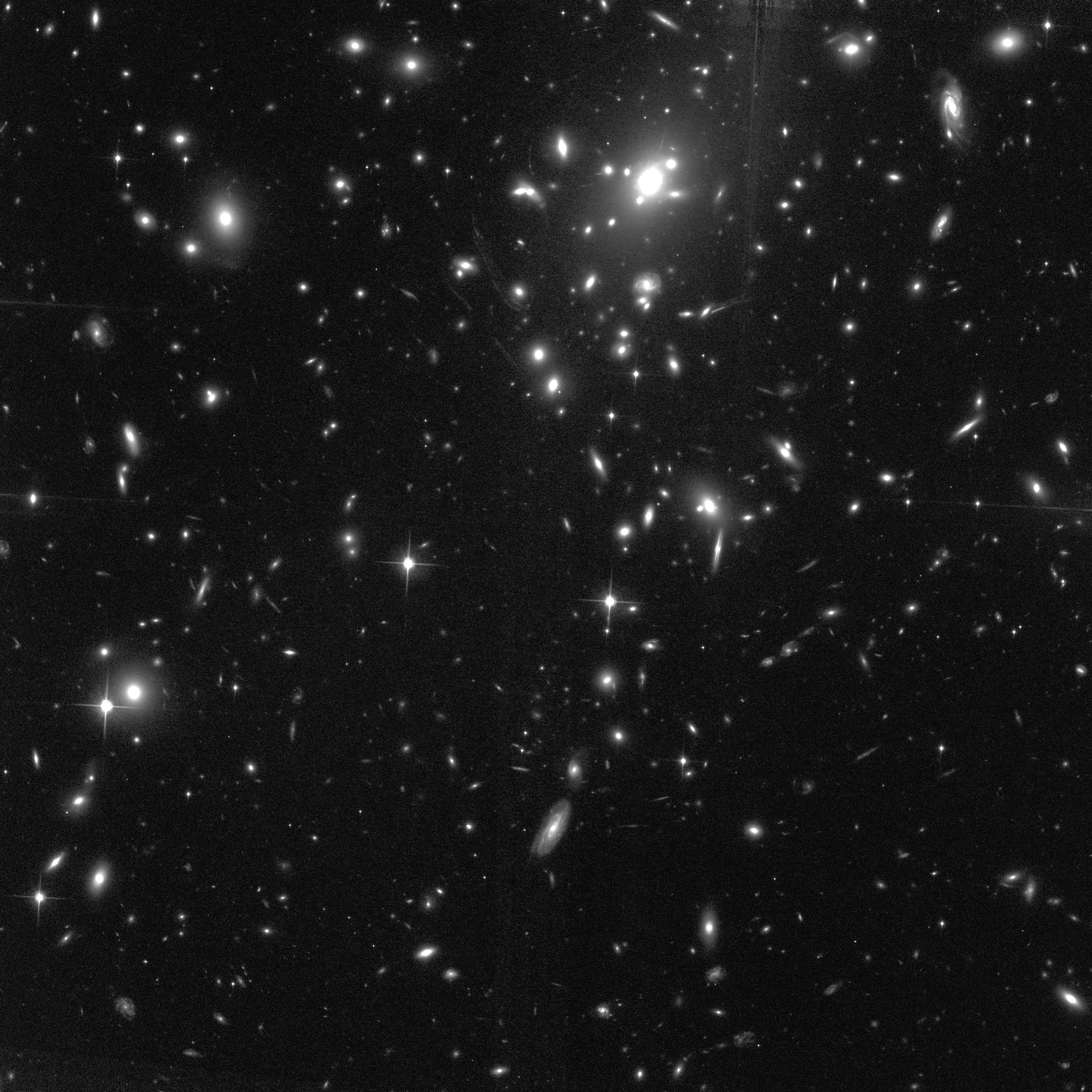
- The galaxy cluster Abell 1835 behind which the galaxy Abell 1835 IR1916 was discovered

Observation data (J2000 epoch)
- Constellation: Virgo
- Right ascension: 14^{h} 01^{m} 00.0^{s}
- Declination: +02° 52′ 44″
- Redshift: 10.0
- Distance: 13.2 billion light-years (4.04 Gpc)

Characteristics
- Mass: 1.0×10^{9} M_{☉}

Other designations
- PSR2004 1916

Abell 1835 IR1916 (also known as Abell 1835, Galaxy Abell 1835, Galaxy Abell 1835 IR1916, or simply The Abell) was a candidate for being the most distant galaxy ever observed, although that claim has not been verified by additional observations. It was claimed to lie behind the galaxy cluster Abell 1835, in the constellation Virgo.

== Initial observation ==
Abell 1835 was discovered by French and Swiss astronomers of the European Southern Observatory, namely Roser Pelló, Johan Richard, Jean-François Le Borgne, Daniel Schaerer, and Jean-Paul Kneib. The astronomers used a near-infrared instrument on the Very Large Telescope to detect the galaxy; other observatories were then used to make an image of it possible. The Observatory, in conjunction with the Swiss National Science Foundation, the French Centre National de la Recherche Scientifique, and the journal Astronomy and Astrophysics, issued a press release on 1 March 2004 announcing the discovery. It was believed to be more distant than the galaxy lensed by Abell 2218.

== Age and distance ==
The initial observer's analysis of J-band observations indicated that Abell 1835 IR1916 has a redshift factor of z~10.0, meaning that it appears to us as it was about 13.2 billion years ago, only 470 million years after the Big Bang and very close to the first burst of star formation in the universe. Its visibility at such a great distance was credited to gravitational lensing by the galaxy cluster Abell 1835 between it and us.

Further analysis of the data that led to the first announcement has cast doubt on the claim that it is a distant object, and follow-up observations in the H-band using the Gemini North Telescope and observations from the orbiting Spitzer Space Telescope were not able to detect it at all, the latter regarding it to be an artefact.

== See also ==
- Abell 370
- IOK-1
- HD1 (galaxy), The most distant galaxy known.
