= Abell 2218 BCG =

Type-cD galaxy in the constellation Draco

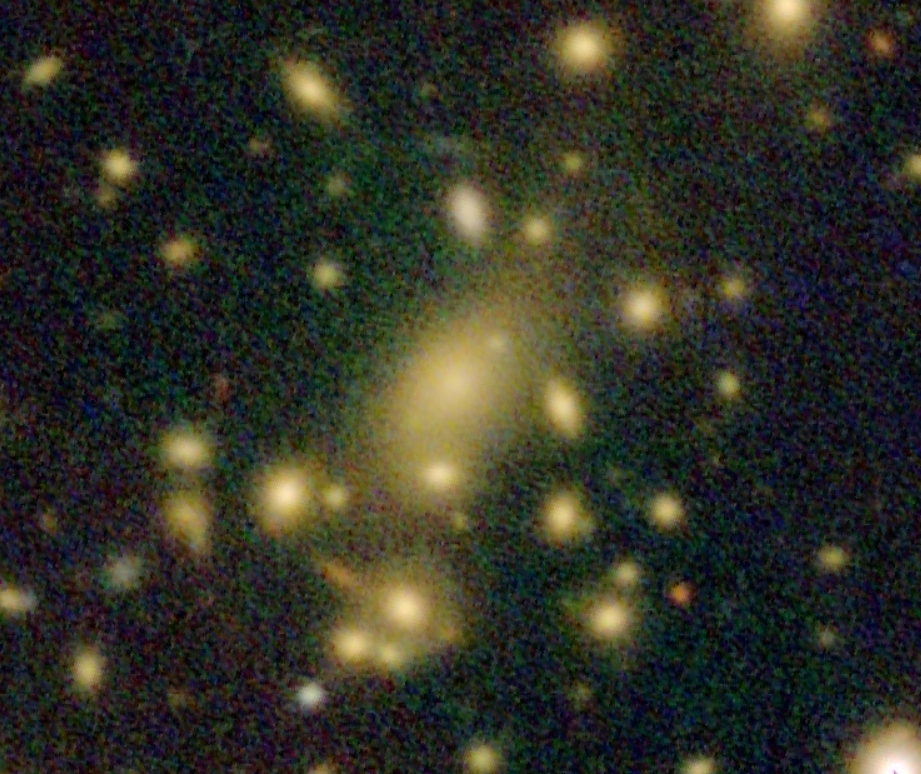
- Pan-STARRS image of Abell 2218 BCG

Observation data (J2000.0 epoch)
- Constellation: Draco
- Right ascension: 16^{h} 35^{m} 49.12^{s}
- Declination: +66° 12′ 33.88″
- Redshift: 0.172000
- Heliocentric radial velocity: 51,564 ± 120 km/s
- Distance: 2,489.4 ± 174.5 Mly (763.25 ± 53.49 Mpc)
- Group or cluster: Abell 2218
- magnitude (J): 15.17

Characteristics
- Type: cD;E
- Size: ~600,000 ly (183.9 kpc) (estimated)

Other designations
- 2MASX J16354949+6612360, Abell 2218:[BOW83] 008, LEDA 140648, 2MFGC 13294, [HMD2010] J163549.1+661233.9

Abell 2218 BCG (Short for Abell 2218 Brightest Cluster Galaxy) is a massive elliptical galaxy of type-cD located in the constellation of Draco. The redshift of the galaxy is (z) 0.172 and it was first discovered in January 1988 by astronomers who noted curved structures around it. It is the brightest cluster galaxy of Abell 2218, a luminous Bautz-Morgan class II galaxy cluster.

== Description ==
Abell 2218 BCG is the central dominant galaxy of Abell 2218. The galaxy has a low surface brightness central profile and a single nucleus. Its galactic envelope is best described by a de Vaucouleurs law profile and is more than 180 kiloparsecs in length. The ellipticity increases in an outward direction with the isothopes in the innermost region at the radius of one arcsecond depicted as circularized. The BCG's major axis decreases along with its radius, with the twist angle being around 8°.

The total stellar population of the BCG is estimated to be aged 9.8 ± 2.8 billion years, with a stellar mass of 102.1 ± 2.6 × 10^{10} M_{☉}. The U – R color is 0.02 ± 0.10 magnitude with a U – R color gradient of -0.41 ± 0.11 magnitude per dex^{−1}. A study published in July 1999, has found the optical spectrum of the BCG shows the absence of emission lines. The central core of the BCG has a red appearance based on its inner color profile shape with the r' best surface brightness profile parameter being 23.60^{+0.14}_{−0.17} magnitude.

There are two faint resolved arc structures extending from east to west around the BCG. The first arc is the brightest, with a curvature radius of 130 ± 20 kiloparsecs and is located from the center. The second arc is faint, with both a bright part and a faint extension. This faint arc has a curvature radius of 100 kiloparsecs and is situated 20 kiloparsecs from the BCG's center from south to east.
