= IOK-1 =

Galaxy in constellation Coma Berenices

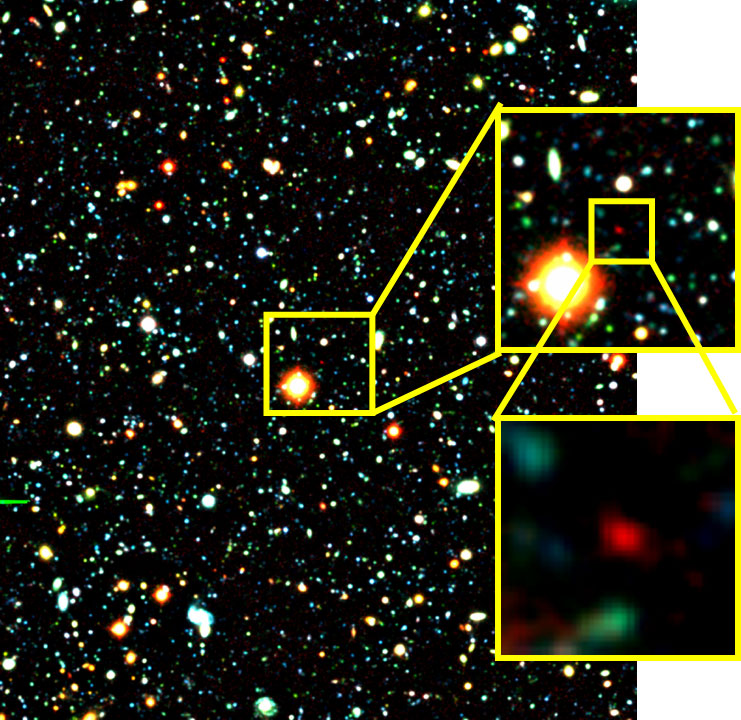
- IOK-1 by the Subaru Telescope

Observation data (J2000 epoch)
- Constellation: Coma Berenices
- Right ascension: 13^{h} 23^{m} 59.8^{s}
- Declination: +27° 24′ 56″
- Redshift: 6.964
- Distance: 12.88 billion light-years (3.95 Gpc)
- Apparent magnitude (V): 24.4

Characteristics
- Type: LAE
- Size: 4,000 ly (1,200 pc) (diameter); 2,000 ly (610 pc) (radius)
- Apparent size (V): 0.001 x 0.001

Other designations
- JEM2013 62, OIK2017 NB973-SDF-85821, OMS2009 SDF-63544

IOK-1 is a distant galaxy in the constellation Coma Berenices. When discovered in 2006, it was the oldest and most distant galaxy ever found, at redshift 6.96.

It was discovered in April 2006 by Masanori Iye at National Astronomical Observatory of Japan using the Subaru Telescope in Hawaii and is seen as it was 12.88 billion years ago. Its emission of Lyman alpha radiation has a redshift of 6.96, corresponding to just 750 million years after the Big Bang. While some scientists have claimed other objects (such as Abell 1835 IR1916) to be even older, IOK-1's age and composition have been more reliably established.

"IOK" stands for the observers' names Iye, Ota, and Kashikawa.

== See also ==
- Abell 2218
- Abell 370
- A1689-zD1
- UDFy-38135539
- List of the most distant astronomical objects

Preceded by SDF J132522.3+273520	Most distant astronomical object 2006–2009	Succeeded by GRB 090423
Preceded by SDF J132522.3+273520	Most distant galaxy 2006–2011	Succeeded by BDF-3299
