= BX442 =

Distant grand design spiral galaxy in the constellation Pegasus

Q2343-BX442
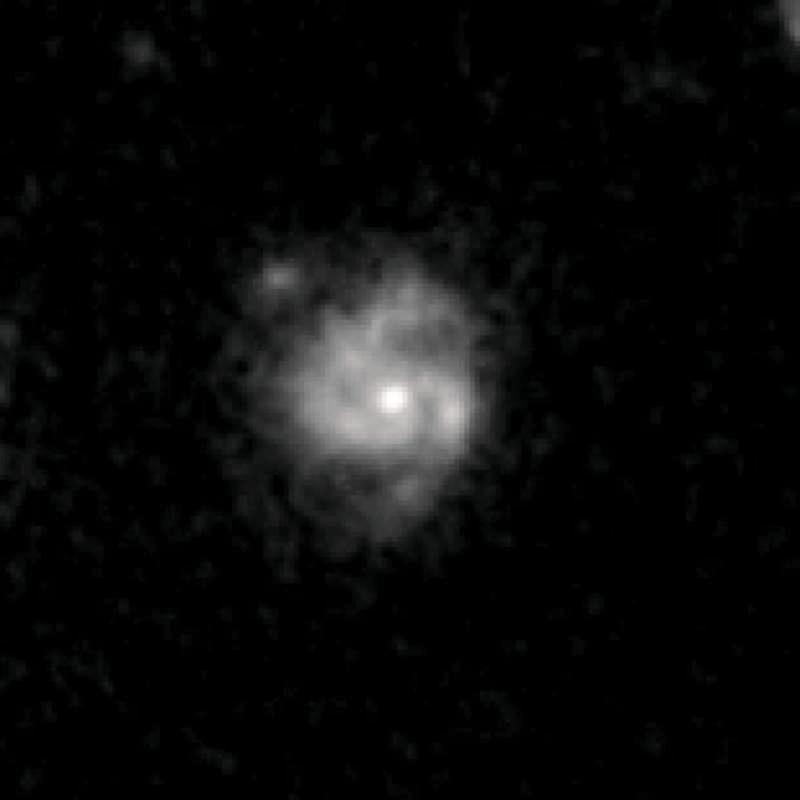
- BX442 (Hubble Legacy Archive)

Observation data (J2000 epoch)
- Constellation: Pegasus
- Right ascension: 23^{h} 46^{m} 19.35^{s}
- Declination: +12° 48′ 00.0″
- Redshift: 2.1765±0.0001
- Heliocentric radial velocity: 652348±0.0001 km/s
- Galactocentric velocity: 652498±6 km/s
- Distance: 10.7 billion ly (3.3 billion pc) (light travel distance); 18 billion ly (5.5 billion pc) (present proper distance)
- Apparent magnitude (V): 24.4R

Characteristics
- Type: Sc
- Size: ~50 kly (diameter)
- Apparent size (V): 0.015 x 0.01 moa

Other designations
- HB89 2343+125 BX442, PGC 4668406, SSTSL2 J234619.33+124759.4

BX442 (Q2343-BX442) is a grand design spiral galaxy of type Sc. It has a companion dwarf galaxy. It is the most distant known grand design spiral galaxy in the universe, with a redshift of z=2.1765 ± 0.0001. It is commonly referred to as the oldest known grand design spiral galaxy in the universe, but it is more accurately the earliest such galaxy known to exist in the universe, with a lookback time (the difference between the age of the universe now and the age of the universe at the time light left the galaxy) of 10.7 billion years in the concordance cosmology. This time estimate means that structure seen in BX442 developed roughly 3 billion years after the Big Bang. It is 15 kiloparsecs (50 kly) in diameter, and has a mass of 6 × 10^{10} solar masses.

== Galaxy ==
The spiral morphology of BX442, while similar to many modern-day galaxies, makes it unusual in the young universe. According to study co-author Alice E. Shapley of UCLA, "The vast majority of old galaxies look like train wrecks. Our first thought was, why is this one so different, and so beautiful?"

The unusual spiral morphology of BX442 was discovered using images obtained from the Hubble Space Telescope by a team of astronomers led by David R. Law of the University of Toronto. While the Hubble image suggested the galaxy's spiral structure however, it didn't conclusively prove that the galaxy rotated like modern-day spiral galaxies. The team therefore used an integral-field spectrograph called OSIRIS (OH-Suppressing Infrared Imaging Spectrograph) at the W.M. Keck Observatory in Hawaii to confirm their discovery. In combination with a laser-guide-star adaptive optics system which corrects for distortions of incoming light caused by the Earth's turbulent atmosphere, the astronomers were able to sample the light from different parts of the galaxy. Small Doppler shifts of the light between different samples showed that BX442 was indeed a spiral disk, rotating roughly as fast as the Milky Way Galaxy, but much thicker and forming stars more rapidly.

Not only was BX442 revealed to be a genuine spiral galaxy, but part of a sub-class known as 'grand-design' spirals. Most spiral galaxies have subtler features and the arms of the spiral are not necessarily well-defined. A grand design spiral galaxy has very clearly well-formed and distinct arms that significantly stretch out around the galaxy center. Of all spiral galaxies, only about 10% of them are classified as a grand design spiral galaxy.

According to lead author David R. Law, "The fact that this galaxy exists is astounding. Current wisdom holds that such grand-design spiral galaxies simply didn't exist at such an early time in the history of the Universe."

The presence of a dwarf galaxy in the vicinity of BX442 offers a clue as to how the premature spiral structure may have emerged in what would otherwise be a somewhat chaotic lumpy collection of stars, as is the case with most other early galaxies. A recent study of one of the satellite galaxies of the Milky Way, known as the Sagittarius Dwarf Elliptical Galaxy (SagDEG), suggest that SagDEG may have helped generate some the Milky Way's spiral structure when it passed repeatedly through the plane of our galaxy over the past few hundred million years. Similarly, many of the most well-known grand design spiral galaxies (such as the Whirlpool Galaxy) also have nearby companions. A computer simulation has shown that the dwarf companion of BX442 could have had the same effect. However, the chaotic motions of the stars in the youthful BX442 suggest that, if this is the case, the present spiral structure will not be long-lived in cosmic terms, and may have disappeared within a hundred million years or so.

== See also ==
- A1689B11, an old and distant spiral galaxy located in the Abell 1689 galaxy cluster
- BRI 1335-0417, another old and distant spiral galaxy
