= Abell 1835 =

Galaxy cluster in the constellation Virgo

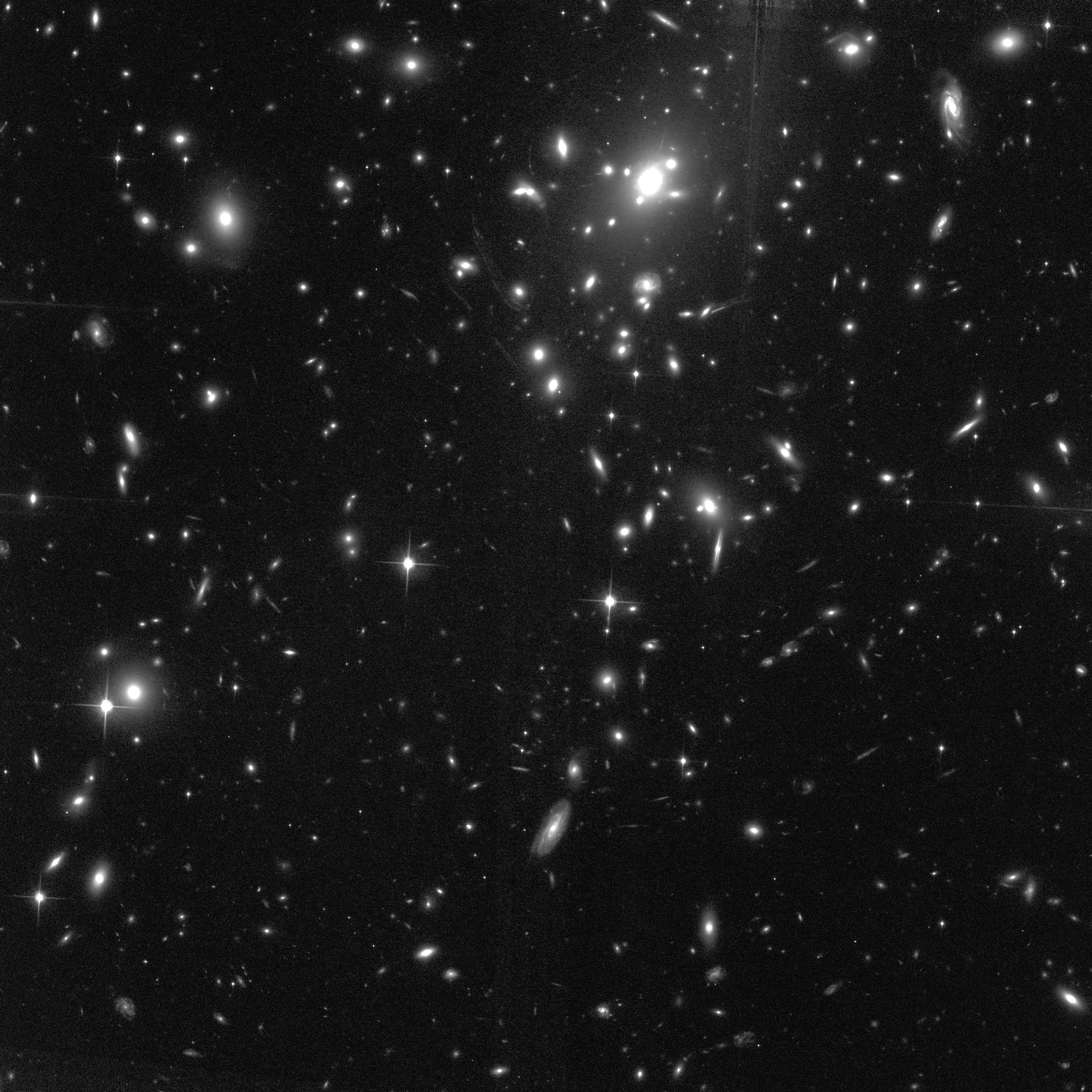
- Abell 1835 by Hubble Space Telescope, 3.18′ view

Observation data (Epoch J2000)
- Constellation: Virgo
- Right ascension: 14^{h} 01^{m}
- Declination: +02° 51′
- Richness class: 0
- Redshift: 0.25320
- Distance: 3,296 Gpc (10,750 Gly) h^{−1}_{0.705}
- X-ray flux: (11.30 ± 7.3%)×10^{−11} erg s^{−1} cm^{−2} (0.1–2.4 keV)

Abell 1835 is a galaxy cluster in the Abell catalogue. It is a cluster that also gravitational lenses more-distant background galaxies to make them visible to astronomers. The cluster has a red shift of around 75,900 km/s and spans 12′.

In 2004, one of the galaxies lensed by this cluster was proposed to be the most distant galaxy known, Galaxy Abell 1835 IR1916.

== See also ==
- Abell 2218
- List of Abell clusters
