= HCM-6A =

Galaxy in the constellation Cetus

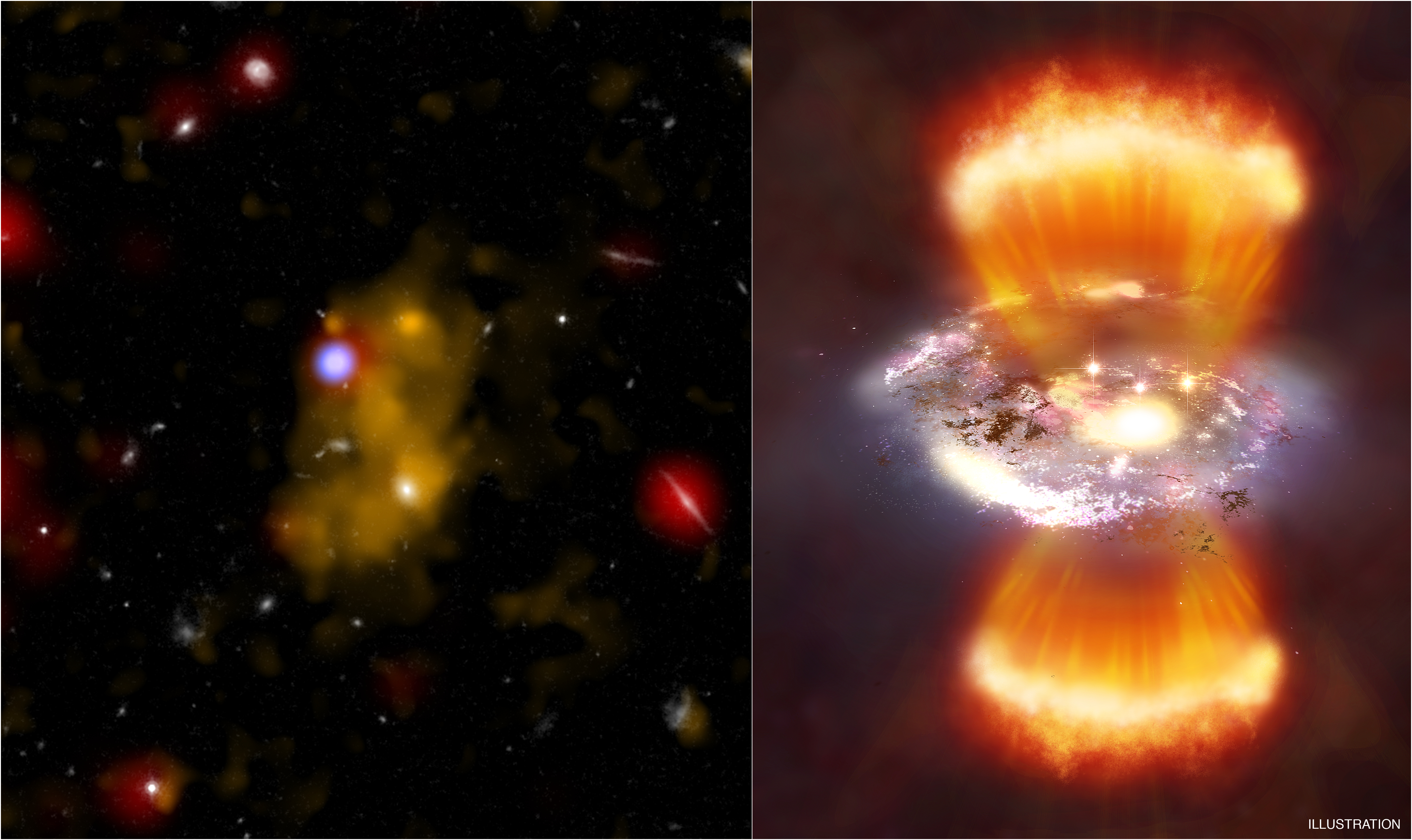
- The composite image on the left shows one of the largest blobs observed in this study. Glowing hydrogen gas in the blob is shown by a Lyman-alpha optical image (colored yellow) from the National Astronomy Observatory of Japan's Subaru telescope. A galaxy located in the blob is visible in a broadband optical image (white) from the Hubble Space Telescope and an infrared image from the Spitzer Space Telescope (red). Finally, the Chandra X-ray Observatory image in blue shows evidence for a growing supermassive black hole in the center of the galaxy. Radiation and outflows from this active black hole are powerful enough to light up and heat the gas in the blob. Radiation and winds from rapid star formation occurring in the galaxy is believed to have similar effects. Clear evidence for four other active black holes in blobs is also seen.

Observation data (J2000 epoch)
- Constellation: Cetus
- Right ascension: 02^{h} 39^{m} 54.7^{s}
- Declination: −01° 33′ 32″
- Redshift: 6.56
- Distance: 12.8 billion light years (4.0 billion parsecs) (light travel distance); 28.2 billion light years (8.6 billion parsecs) (comoving distance)
- Apparent magnitude (V): 24.24

Characteristics
- Type: LAE

Other designations
- HCB2010 J023954-013332

HCM-6A is an LAE galaxy that was found in 2002 by Esther Hu and Lennox Cowie from the University of Hawaiʻi and Richard McMahon from the University of Cambridge, using the Keck II Telescope in Hawaii. HCM-6A is located behind the Abell 370 galactic cluster, near M77 in the constellation Cetus, which enabled the astronomers to use Abell 370 as a gravitational lens to get a clearer image of the object.

HCM-6A was the farthest object known at the time of its discovery. It exceeded SSA22−HCM1 (z = 5.74) as the most distant normal galaxy known, and quasar SDSSp J103027.10+052455.0 (z = 6.28) as the most distant object known. In 2003, SDF J132418.3+271455 (z = 6.578) was discovered, and took over the title of most remote object known, most remote galaxy known, and most remote normal galaxy known.

Preceded by SDSSp J103027.10+052455.0	Most distant astronomical object 2002 — 2003	Succeeded by SDF J132418.3+271455
Preceded by SSA22−HCM1	Most distant galaxy 2002 — 2003	Succeeded by SDF J132418.3+271455
