= BRI 1335-0417 =

Spiral galaxy in the constellation Virgo

Observation data (J2000 epoch)
- Constellation: Virgo
- Right ascension: 13^{h} 38^{m} 03.38^{s}
- Declination: −04° 32′ 35.3″
- Redshift: 4.4
- Heliocentric radial velocity: 1,321,305 km/s (821,021 mi/s)
- Galactocentric velocity: 1,321,240 km/s (820,980 mi/s)
- Distance: 11,934 Gly (3,658.9 Gpc) (Light travel distance) 24,060 Gly (7,376 Gpc) (Comoving distance)
- Apparent magnitude (V): 19.4

Characteristics
- Type: Quasar, Hyperluminous infrared galaxy, spiral galaxy
- Size: 30,000 ly (9,200 pc) (diameter); 15,000 ly (4,600 pc) (radius)
- Apparent size (V): 0.008 × 0.008

Other designations
- WISEA J133803.37-043234.9, QSO J1338-0432

BRI 1335-0417 is a high-redshift spiral galaxy, quasar and a hyperluminous infrared galaxy located in the Constellation Virgo. The galaxy has a redshift of 4.4, meaning its light took 11.934 billion years to reach Earth, when the universe was 1.3 billion years old, and its present comoving distance is about 24.06 billion light-years. It is discovered by ALMA, led by Takafumi Tsukui and his colleague, professor Satoru Iguchi from SOKENDAI, and the National Astronomical Observatory of Japan, in May 2021.

== See also ==
- BX442, an old and distant spiral galaxy
- A1689B11, another old and distant spiral galaxy
