= A1689-zD1 =

Galaxy in the constellation Virgo

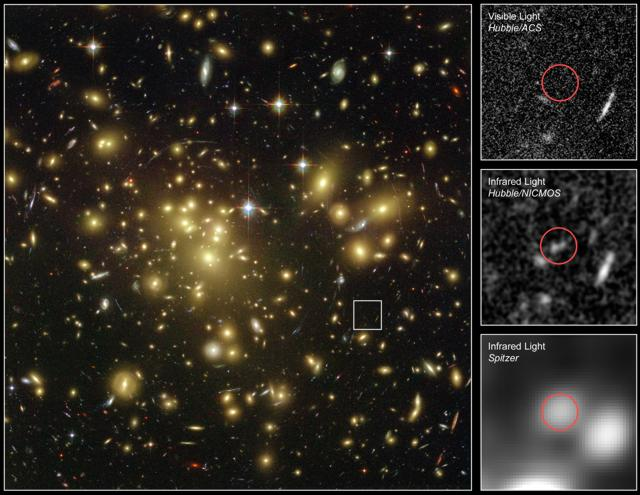
- Location of A1689-zD1 in infrared and visible light by Hubble Space Telescope and Spitzer Space Telescope

Observation data (J2000 epoch)
- Constellation: Virgo
- Right ascension: 13^{h} 11^{m} 29.9^{s}
- Declination: −01° 19′ 19″
- Redshift: 7.6
- Heliocentric radial velocity: 2,278,423 km/s
- Galactocentric velocity: 2,278,351 +/- 3 km/s
- Distance: 13 billion light-years (light travel distance); 30 billion light-years (present proper distance)
- Group or cluster: Abell 1689
- Apparent magnitude (V): 25.3

Characteristics
- Type: Dwarf
- Mass: 1.7×10^{9} M_{☉}
- Size: ~3,000 ly (diameter)
- Apparent size (V): 0.0008 x 0.0008

Other designations
- BBF2008 A1689-zD1

A1689-zD1 is a galaxy in the constellation Virgo. It was a candidate for the most distant and therefore earliest-observed galaxy discovered as of February 2008, based on a photometric redshift.

If its redshift of z = ~7.6 is correct, it would explain why the galaxy's faint light reaches us at infrared wavelengths. It could only be observed with Hubble Space Telescope's Near Infrared Camera and Multi-Object Spectrometer (NICMOS) and the Spitzer Space Telescope's Infrared Array Camera exploiting the natural phenomenon of gravitational lensing: the galaxy cluster Abell 1689, which lies between Earth and A1689-zD1, at a distance of 2.2 billion light-years from us, functions as a natural "magnifying glass" for the light from the far more distant galaxy which lies directly behind it, at 700 million years after the Big Bang, as seen from Earth.

== See also ==
- IOK-1
- UDFy-38135539
- List of the most distant astronomical objects
