= Toulouse Observatory =

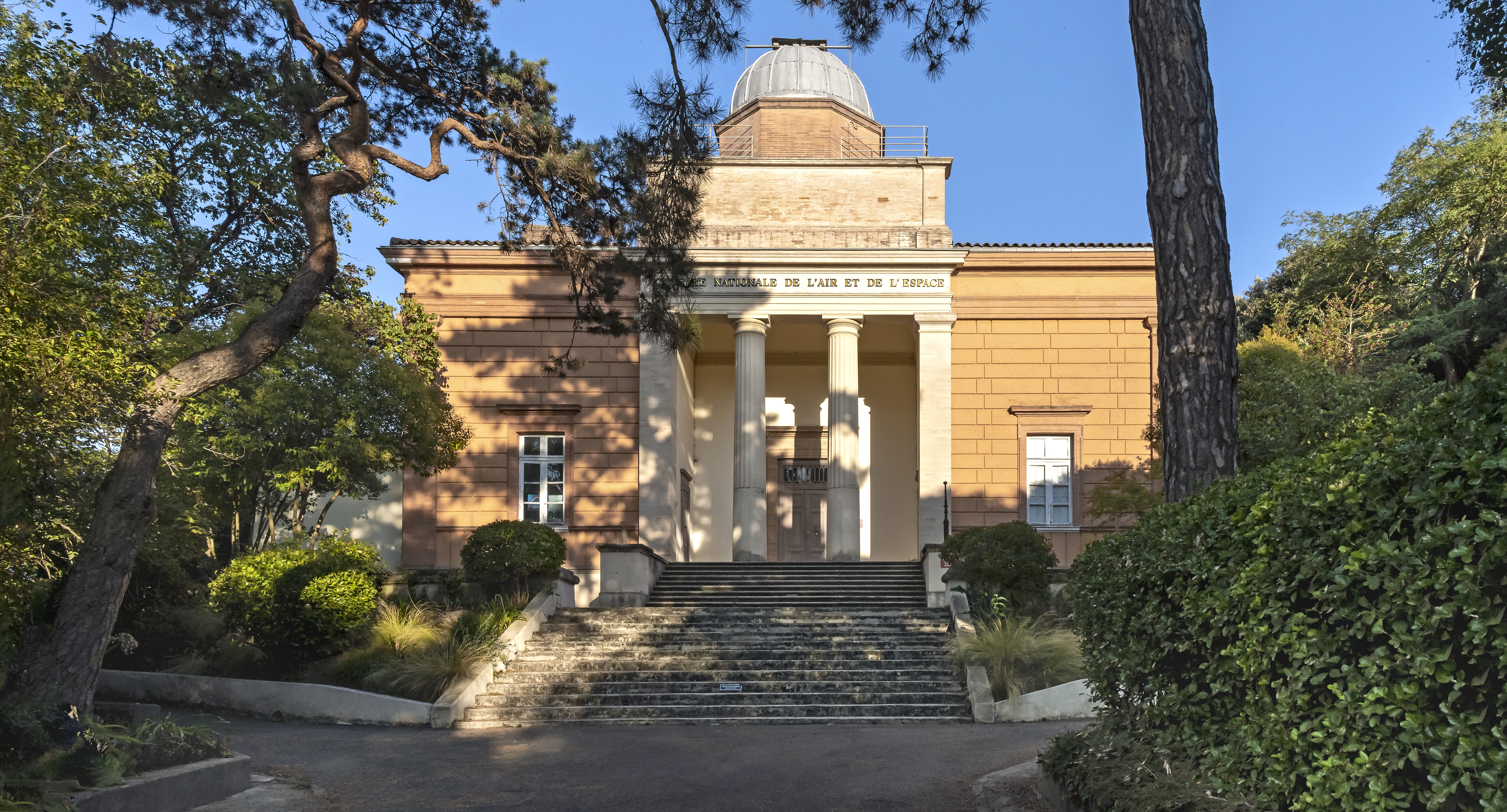
- Facade of the main building
- Observatory code: 004
- Location: Toulouse, France
- Coordinates: 43.61233°N 1.46278°E
- Established: 1733, 1841, 1981
- Related media on Commons

The Toulouse Observatory (French: Observatoire de Toulouse) is located in Toulouse, France and was established in 1733.

It was founded by l'Académie des Sciences, Inscriptions et Belles-Lettres de Toulouse ("Academy of Science, Inscriptions and the Humanities of Toulouse"). It was moved 1841 and again in 1981.

In 1987, Genevieve Soucail of the Toulouse Observatory and her collaborators presented data of a blue ring-like structure in Abell 370 and proposed a gravitational lensing interpretation

In the 1990s the observatory worked on MEGACAM with several other institutions.

== People & Directors ==
The observatory was started by Garipuy in the 1730s with support from the Academy of Sciences.

Félix Tisserand was a famous director from 1873 to 1878. He published Recueil d'exercices sur le calcul infinitesimal as well as making several expeditions, including an 1874 trip to Japan. Henri Joseph Anastase Perrotin was Tisserand's assistant astronomer, and they both went to the Paris Observatory in 1878. Tisserand was succeeded by Benjamin Baillaud.

Director	Life span	Years of directorship
Frédéric Petit	1810–1865	1838–1865
Théodore Despeyrous	1815–1883	1865–1866
Pierre Daguin	1814–1884	1866–1870
Félix Tisserand	1845–1896	1873–1878
Benjamin Baillaud	1848–1934	1878–1907
Eugène Cosserat	1866–1931	1908–1931
Emile Paloque	1891–1982	1931–1960
Roger Bouigues	1920–	1961–1971
Jean Rösch	1915–1999	1971–1981

== History & Telescopes ==
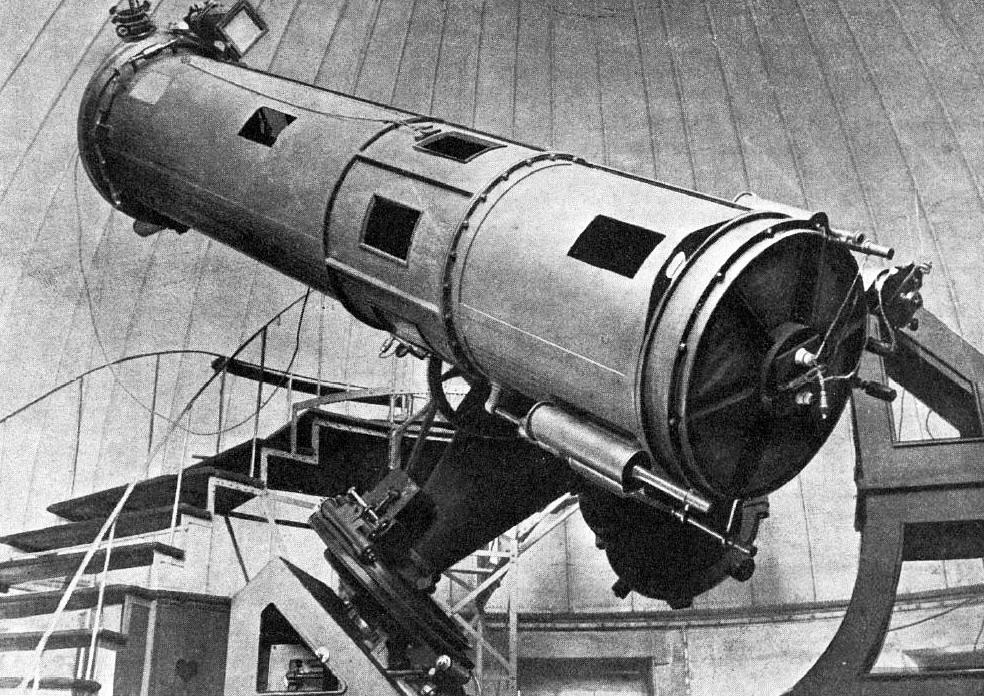
The 83 cm (32.7 in) reflecting telescope of Toulouse, 1935

The observatory was originally founded in 1733. Launch instruments at the observatory included two refractors and 28 inch quadrant, and one clock. By 1840 and additional clock by Julien le Roi of Paris was added.

Among the early observations at the observatory were the 1736 and 1743 transits of Mercury. These observations were conducted by Garipuy, who also observed the transit of Mercury in 1753. Garipuy also built and observatory in his house and conducted observations from there.

By 1770 a new larger observatory was established and again in the 1840s.

In 1871-1873 Toulouse observatory switched from being a municipal to provincial observatory.

In 1873 a 4.5 inch (10.8 cm) refractor by Secretan was added to the Observatory.

In 1875 a reflecting telescope by Henry Brothers was added. The 83 centimetres (33 in) diameter aperture was a reflecting telescope (i.e. mirror) mounted on an equatorial. In 1880 the reflector was re mounted on a cast iron design by Gautier, replacing the wood mounting.

Also in 1880 a new refractor (lens) was acquired, a 9 inch (22 cm) aperture by Brunner. Several other instruments were added at this time, and in the early 1900s a new telescope for the Pic Du Midi mountaintop observatory was also added.

In the 1880s Toulouse Observatory sent some of its oldest instruments to a museum. This included a transit instrument by Lennel dating to 1774, Dollond telescope, and several quadrants.

The observatory participated in the Carte Du Ciel project, recording over a thousand plates (i.e. astronomical photographs) between 1887 and 1939.

In the 1980s astronomers of Toulouse Observatory discovered a gravitational lens in space. They found an arc around Abell 370 and were able to recognized it as this phenomenon.

== Facilities ==
The observatory has used many telescopes over its lifetime. For example, an 83 cm aperture reflecting telescope was installed in 1875.

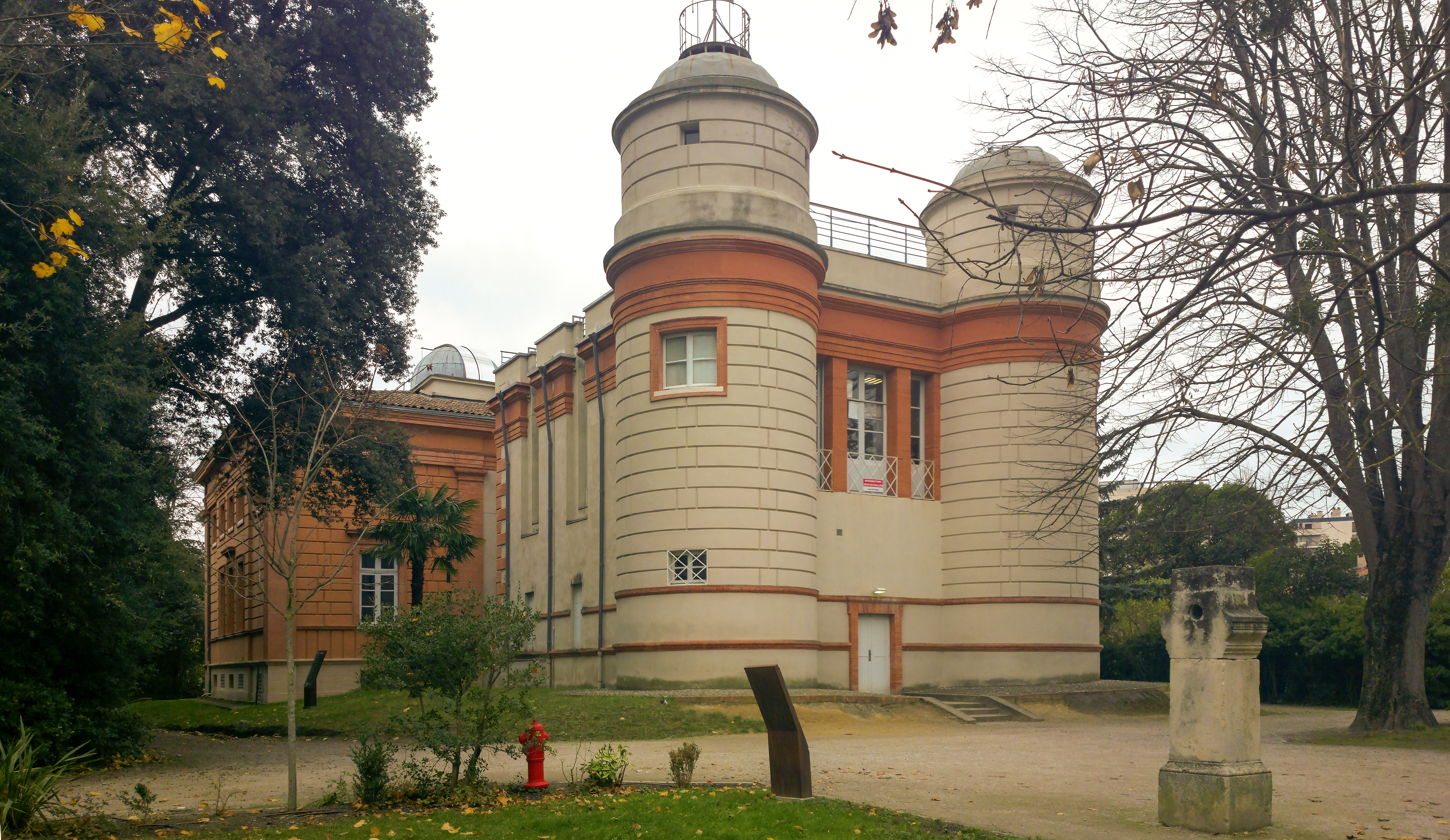
The eastern façade of the Urbain Vitry building

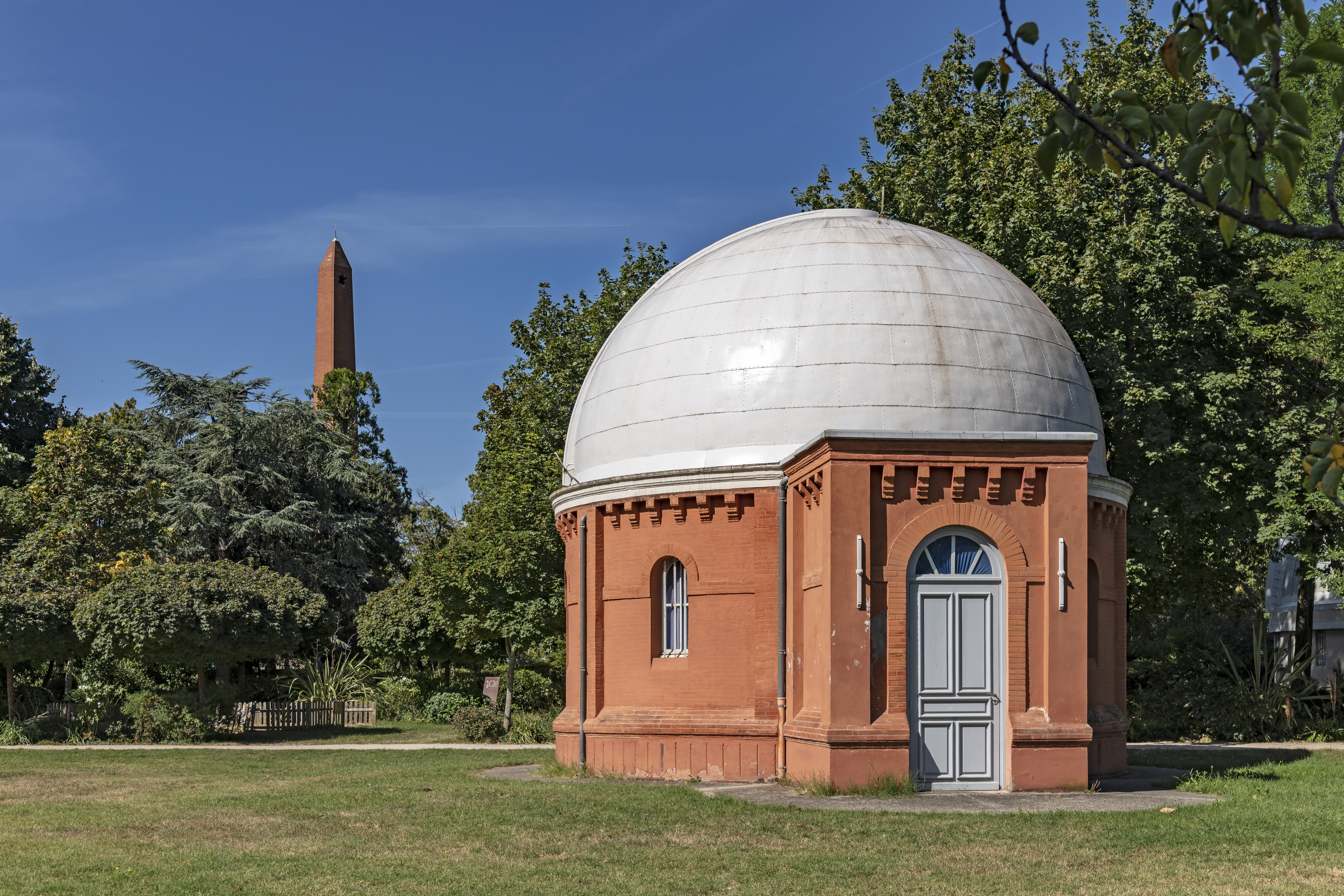
Urbain Vitry cupola

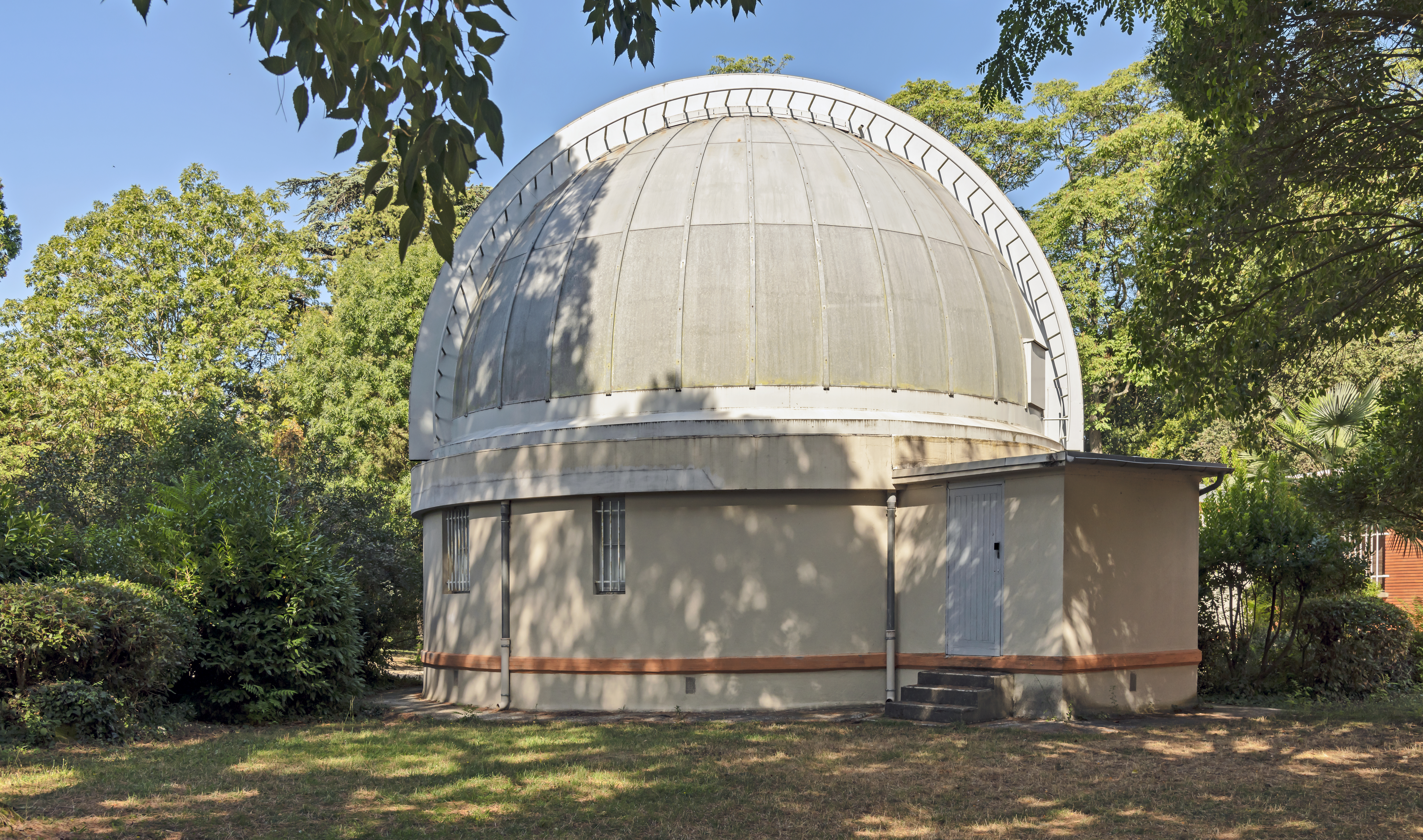
Cupola of the 83 cm telescope

== See also ==
- List of astronomical observatories
- Pic du Midi Observatory
- Observatoire Midi-Pyrénées
- List of largest optical telescopes of the 19th century
