= Abell 2218 =

Galaxy cluster in the constellation Draco

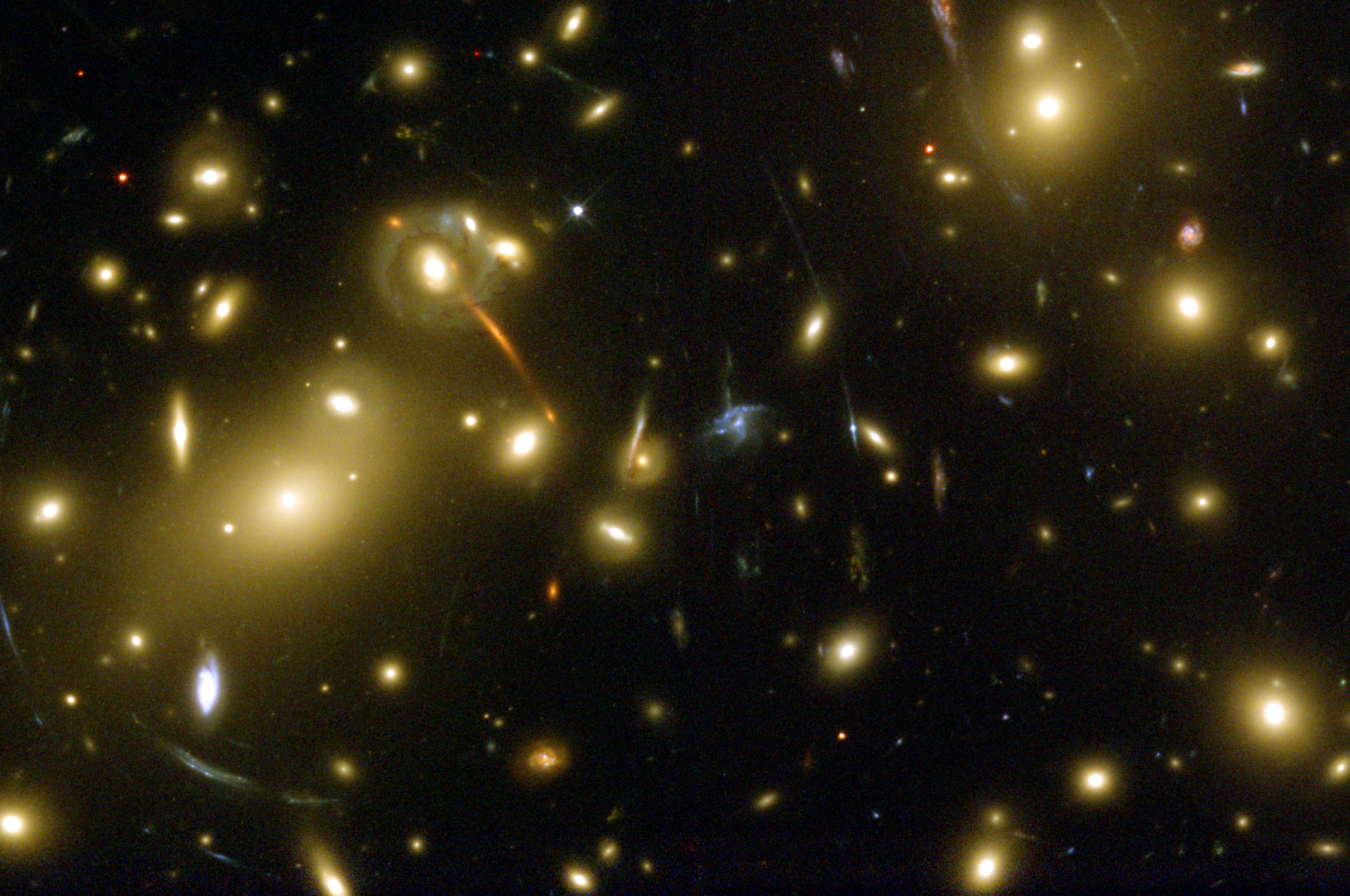
- Abell 2218. Credit: NASA/ESA

Observation data (Epoch J2000)
- Constellation: Draco
- Right ascension: 16^{h} 35^{m} 54^{s}
- Declination: +66° 13′ 00″
- Number of galaxies: ~10,000
- Richness class: 4
- Bautz–Morgan classification: II
- Redshift: 0.17560
- Distance: 719 Mpc (2,345 Mly) h^{−1}_{0.705}
- X-ray flux: (7.50 ± 9.1%)×10^{−12} erg s^{−1} cm^{−2} (0.1–2.4 keV)

Abell 2218 is a large cluster of galaxies over 2 billion light-years away in the constellation Draco.

Acting as a powerful lens, it magnifies and distorts all galaxies lying behind the cluster core into long arcs. The lensed galaxies are all stretched along the cluster's center and some of them are multiply imaged. Those multiple images usually appear as a pair of images with a third — generally fainter — counter image, as is the case for the very distant object. The lensed galaxies are particularly numerous, as we are looking in between two mass clumps, in a saddle region where the magnification is quite large.

== Gravitational lensing ==
Abell 2218 was used as a gravitational lens to discover the most distant known object in the universe as of 2004. The object, a galaxy some 13 billion years old, is seen from Earth as it would have been just 750 million years after the Big Bang.

The color of the lensed galaxies is a function of their distances and types. The orange arc is an elliptical galaxy at moderate redshift (z=0.7). The blue arcs are star-forming galaxies at intermediate redshift (z=1–2.5). There is a pair of images in the lower part of the picture of the newly discovered star-forming galaxy at about redshift 7.

== Dark matter ==
Clusters of galaxies such as Abell 2218 have also been used to infer both the amount and distribution of Dark matter.

== See also ==
- Abell 370
- Abell 1689
- Abell 1835 IR1916
- Abell catalogue
- GRB 090423
- IOK-1
- UDFy-38135539
- X-ray astronomy
