= NGC 6384 =

Galaxy in the constellation of Ophiucus

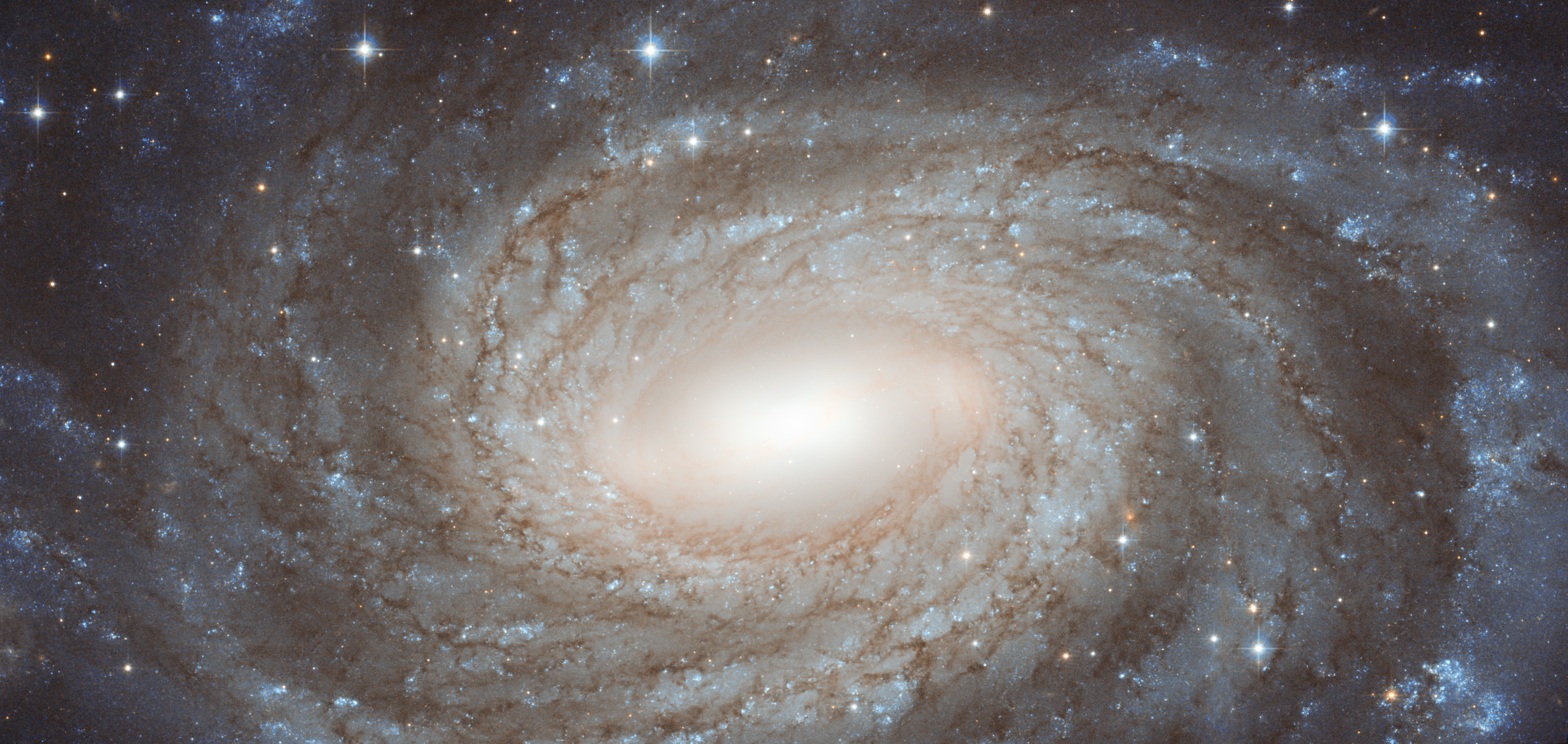
- NGC 6384 imaged by the Hubble Space Telescope

Observation data (J2000 epoch)
- Constellation: Ophiuchus
- Right ascension: 17^{h} 32^{m} 24.302^{s}
- Declination: +07° 03′ 36.97″
- Redshift: 0.005554
- Heliocentric radial velocity: 1,665 km/s
- Distance: 76.6 Mly (23.5 Mpc)

Characteristics
- Type: SAB(r)bc
- Mass: 1.05 × 10^{11} M_{☉}
- Size: 138,000 light years

Other designations
- IRAS 17299+0705, 2MASX J17322430+0703369, UGC 10891, MCG +01-45-001, PGC 60459, CGCG 055-007

NGC 6384 is an intermediate barred spiral galaxy located about 77 million light-years away in the northern part of the constellation Ophiuchus. It was discovered by German-British astronomer Albert Marth on 10 June 1863.

NGC 6384 has a morphological classification of SAB(r)bc, indicating that it is a weakly barred galaxy (SAB) with an inner ring structure (r) orbiting the bar, and moderate to loosely wound spiral arms (bc). The galaxy is inclined by an angle of 47° to the line of sight, along a position angle of 40°. The estimated mass of the stars in this galaxy is 105 billion times the mass of the Sun.

At one time NGC 6384 was considered a normal galaxy with no activity in the nucleus. However, it is now classified as a transition object (T2), which is thought to be a LINER-type galaxy whose emission-line spectra is contaminated by H II regions in the nucleus.

== Supernovae ==
Three supernovae have been observed in NGC 6384:

- SN 1971L (Type Ia, mag. 13) was discovered by W. Logan on 24 June 1971, located 27″ east and 20″ north of the nucleus. It reached a peak visual magnitude of 12.85 around the end of June. It was situated along a spiral arm, suggesting that the progenitor was not a member of the older, more evolved stellar population of the galaxy.
- SN 2017drh (Type Ia, mag. 17.9356) was discovered by the Distance Less Than 40 Mpc Survey (DLT40) on 3 May 2017.
- SN 2024pxl (Type Iax[02cx-like], mag. 17.668) was discovered by the Zwicky Transient Facility on 23 July 2024.

== Gallery ==
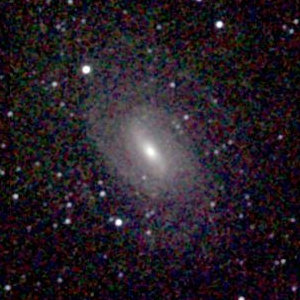
2MASS image of NGC 6384

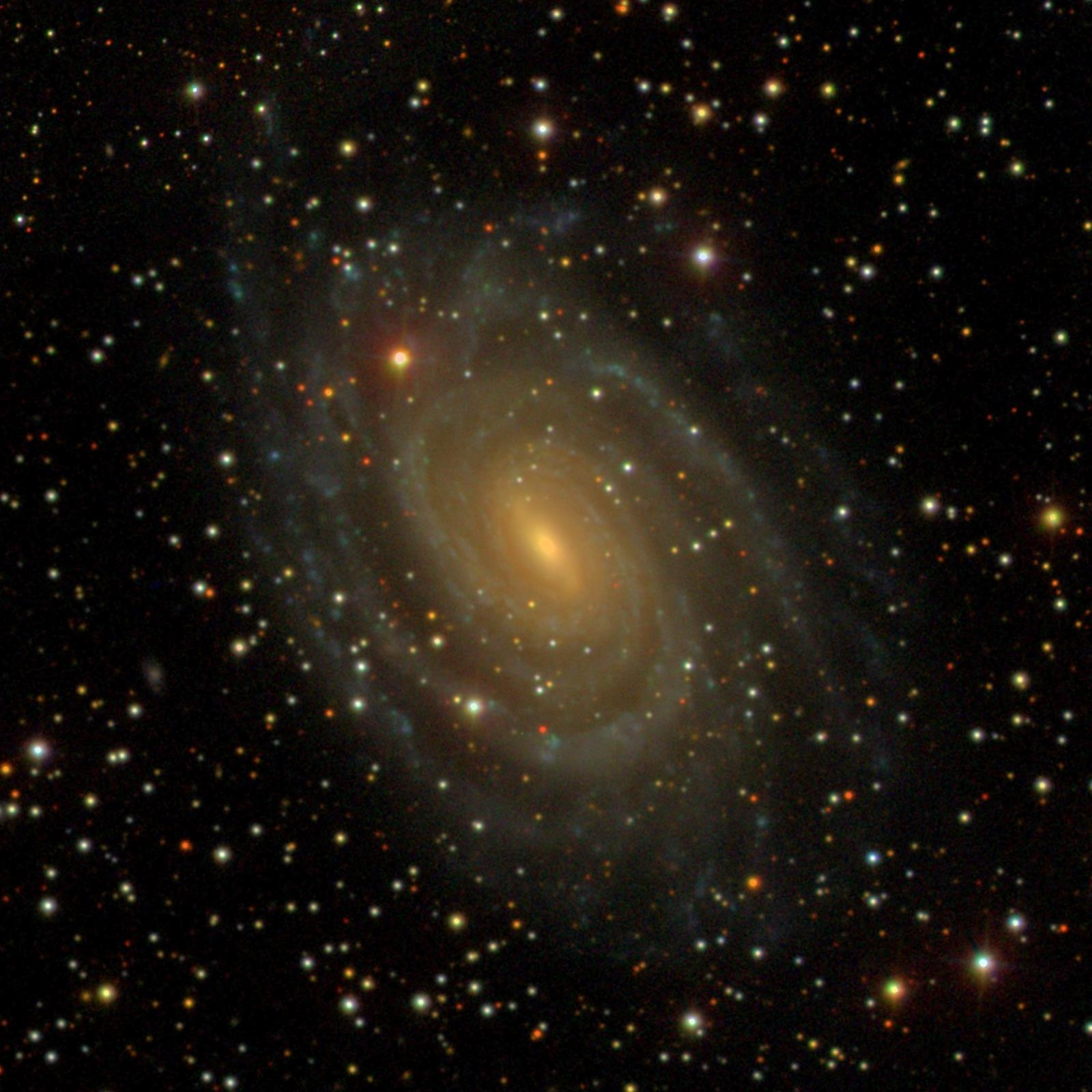
NGC 6384 (SDSS)

== See also ==
- List of NGC objects (6001–7000)
