= Abell 370 =

Galaxy cluster in the constellation Cetus

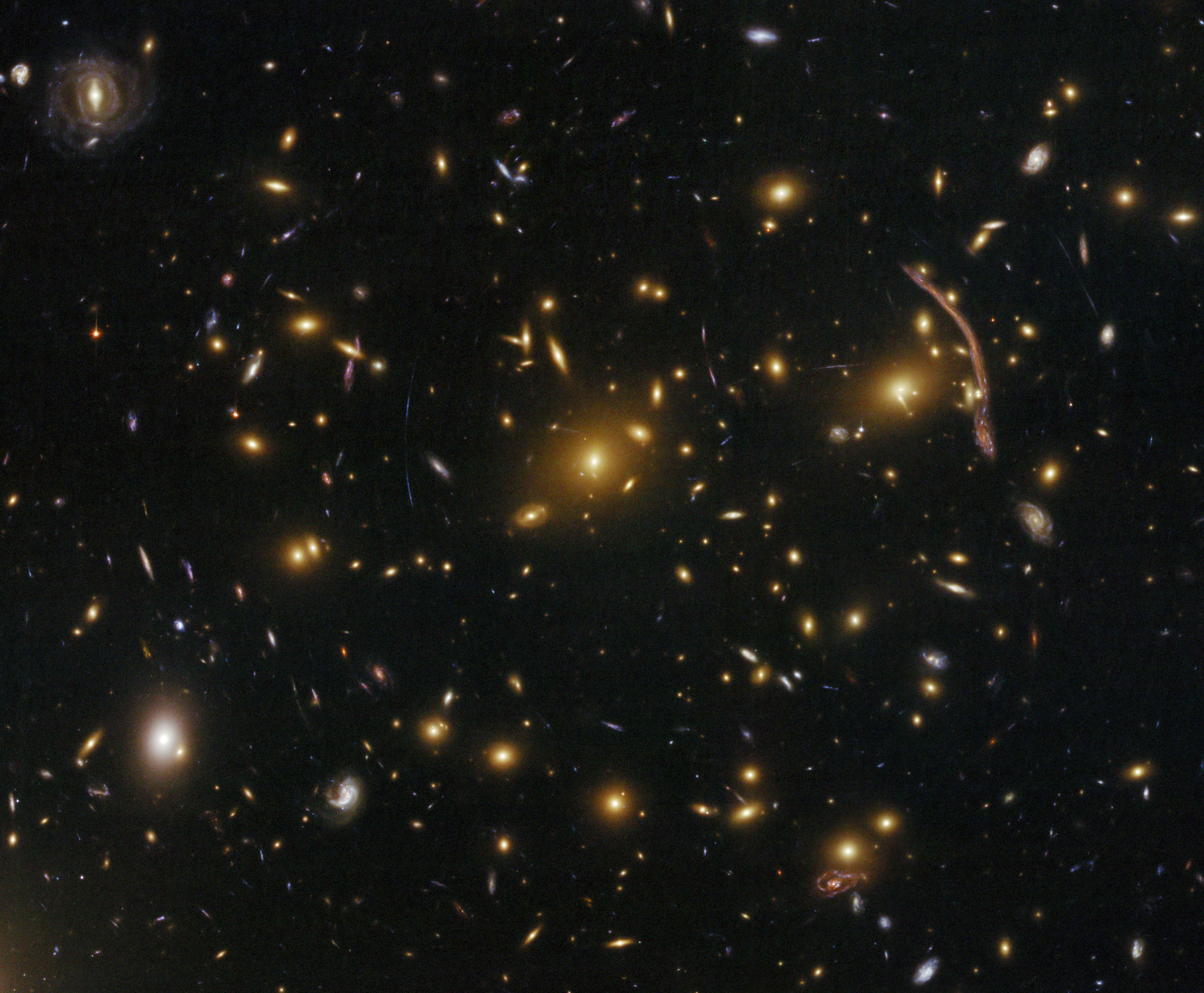
- Abell 370 seen by the Hubble Space Telescope on 16 July 2009.

Observation data (Epoch J2000)
- Constellation: Cetus
- Right ascension: 02^{h} 39^{m} 50.5^{s}
- Declination: −01° 35′ 08″
- Richness class: 0
- Bautz–Morgan classification: II-III
- Redshift: 0.375
- Distance: 1.464 Gpc (4.775 Gly) h^{−1}_{0.705}

Abell 370 is a galaxy cluster located nearly 5 billion light-years away from the Earth (at redshift z = 0.375), in the constellation Cetus. Its core is made up of several hundred galaxies. It was catalogued by George Abell, and is the most distant of the clusters he catalogued.

In the 1980s astronomers of Toulouse Observatory discovered a gravitational lens in space between Earth and Abell 370 using the Canada-France-Hawaii Telescope. A curious arc had been observed earlier near the cluster, but the astronomers were able to recognize it as this phenomenon.

== Gravitational lensing ==
Abell 370 appears to include several arcs of light, including the largest ever discovered at 30" long. It was originally referred to as the Giant Arc, but later renamed to the Dragon Arc. These arcs or deformations are mirages caused by gravitational lensing of distant galaxies by the massive galaxy cluster located between the observer and the magnified galaxies. This cluster shows an apparent magnitude of +22.

In 2002, astronomers used this lensing effect to discover a galaxy, HCM-6A, 12.8 billion light years away from Earth. At the time it was the furthest known galaxy.

In 2009, an HST study in the field of Abell 370 revealed in greater detail the 30" long arc with the appearance of a dragon, and hence rebranded as The Dragon by NASA scientists. Its head is composed of a spiral galaxy, with another image of the spiral composing the tail. Several other images form the body of the dragon, all overlapping. These galaxies all lie approximately 5 billion light years away.

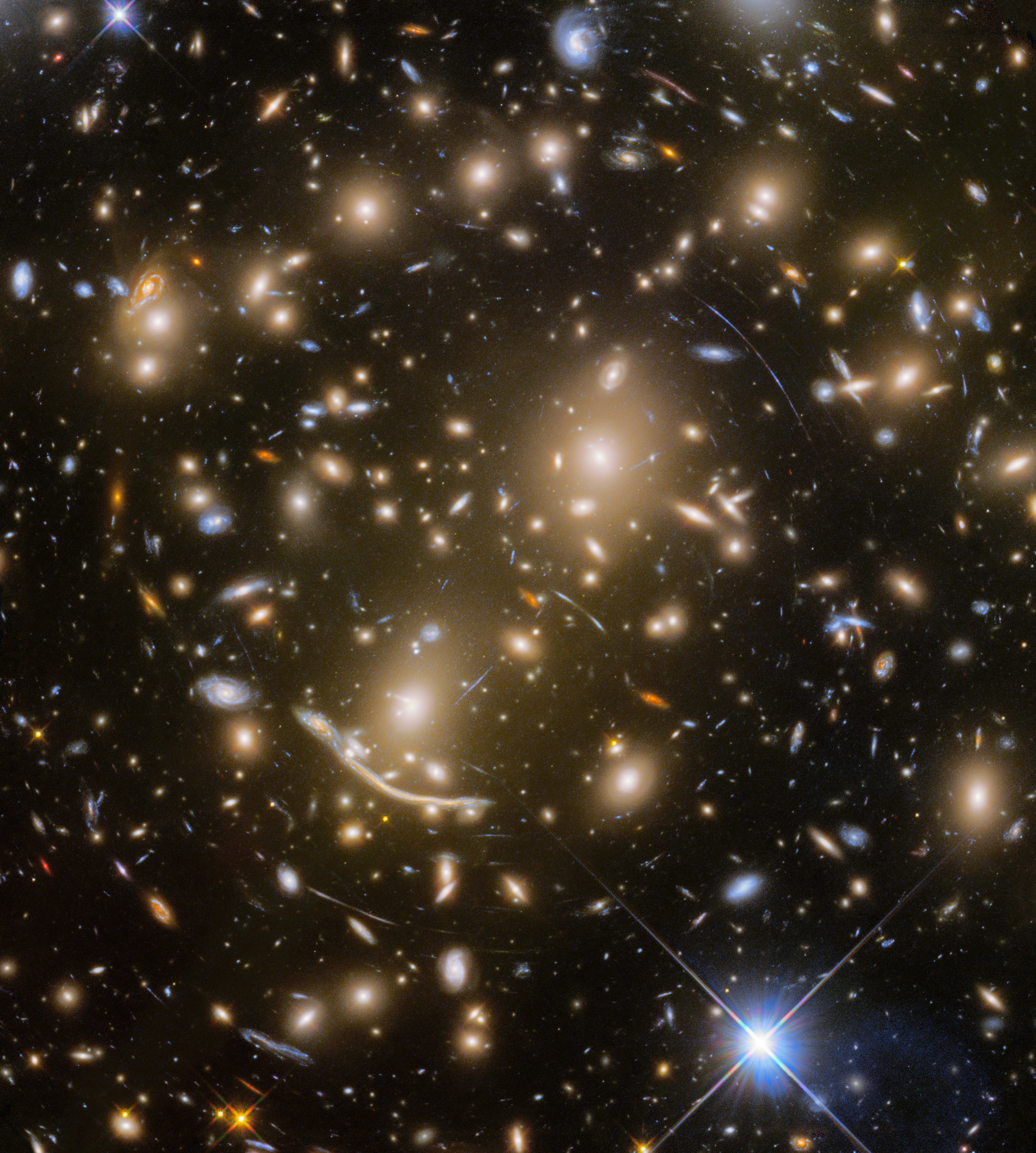
Gravitational lensing in the galaxy clusters including "The Dragon" (to the lower left of center)

== See also ==
- Abell 2218
- Abell catalogue
- List of Abell clusters
