= Abell 1689 =

Large galaxy cluster in the constellation Virgo

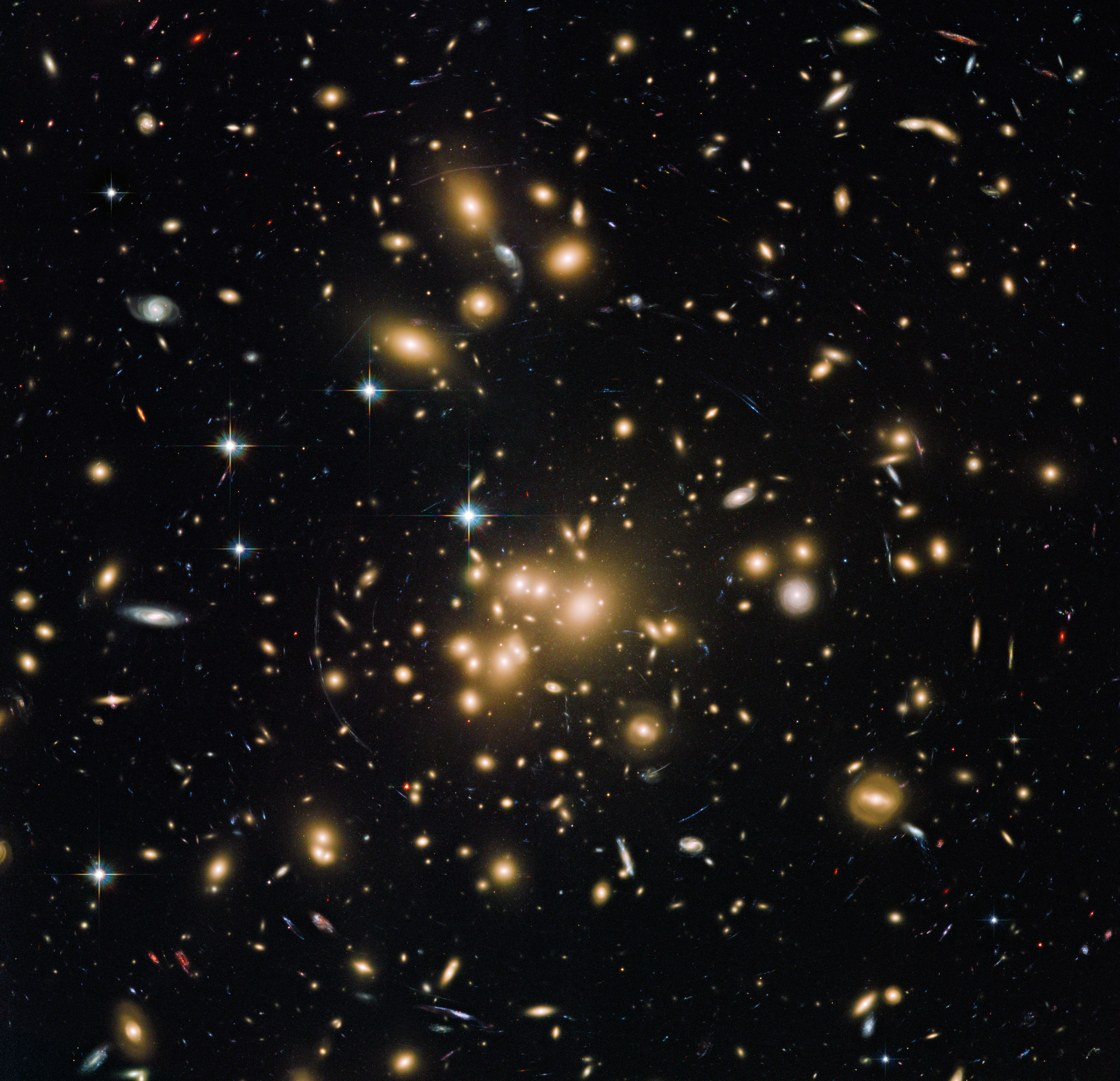
- Hubble view of galaxy cluster Abell 1689. It combines both visible and infrared data, with a combined exposure time of over 34 hours.

Observation data (Epoch J2000)
- Constellation: Virgo
- Right ascension: 13^{h} 11^{m} 34.2^{s}
- Declination: −01° 21′ 56″
- Richness class: 4
- Bautz–Morgan classification: II-III
- Redshift: 0.1832
- Distance: 754 Mpc (2,459 Mly) h^{−1}_{0.705}
- X-ray flux: (14.729 ± 8.1%)×10^{−11} erg s^{−1} cm^{−2} (0.1–2.4 keV)

Abell 1689 is a galaxy cluster in the constellation Virgo over 2.3 billion light-years away.

== Details ==
Abell 1689 is one of the biggest and most massive galaxy clusters known and acts as a gravitational lens, distorting the images of galaxies that lie behind it. It has the largest system of gravitational arcs ever found.

Abell 1689 shows over 160,000 globular clusters, the largest population ever found.

There is evidence of merging and gases in excess of 100 million degrees. The very large mass of this cluster makes it useful for the study of dark matter and gravitational lensing.

At the time of its discovery in 2008, one of the lensed galaxies, A1689-zD1, was the most distant galaxy found.

== Gallery ==
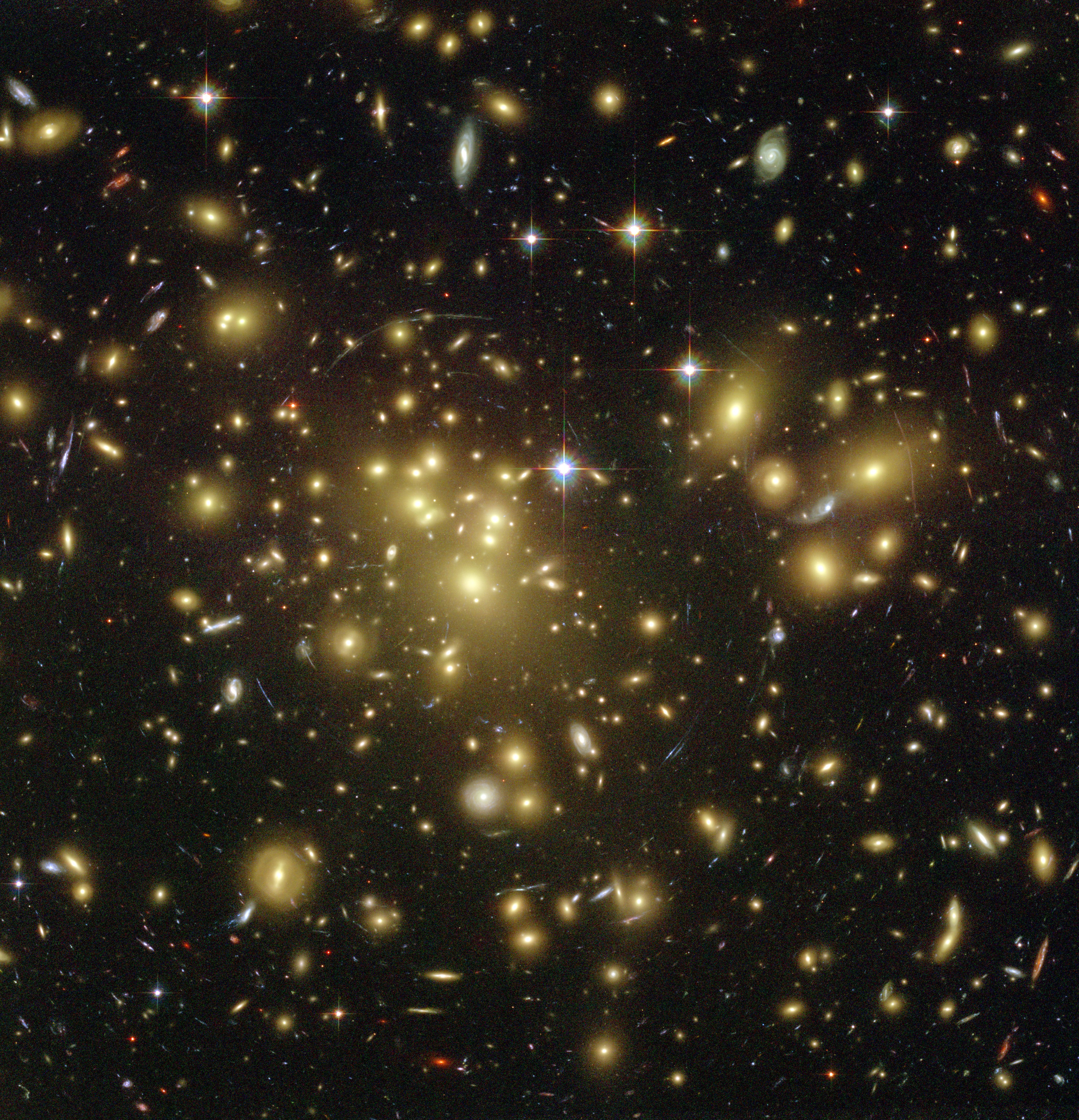
Yellow galaxies belong to the cluster itself. Red and blue are background galaxies gravitationally lensed.

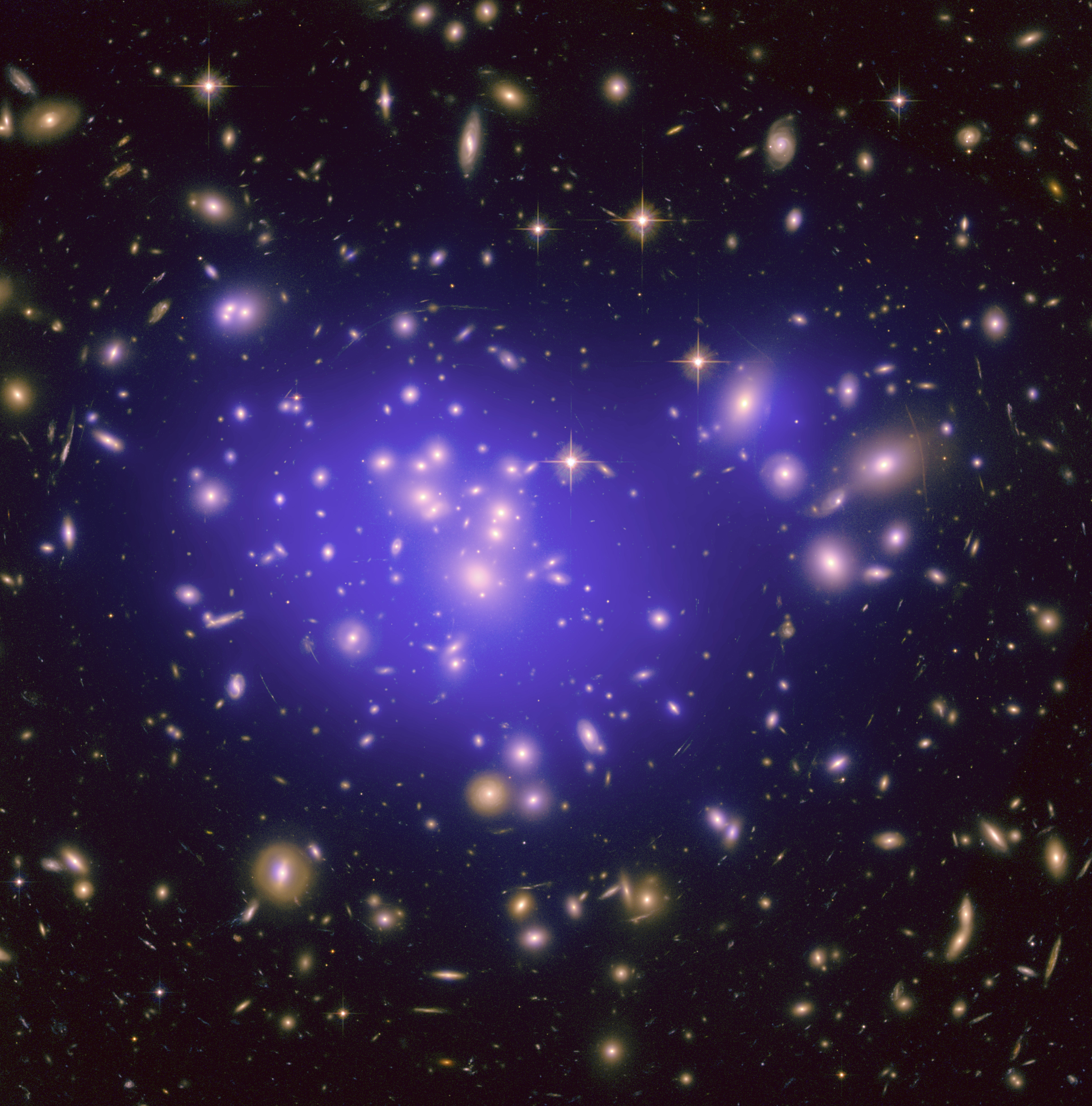
Mass map of Abell 1689.

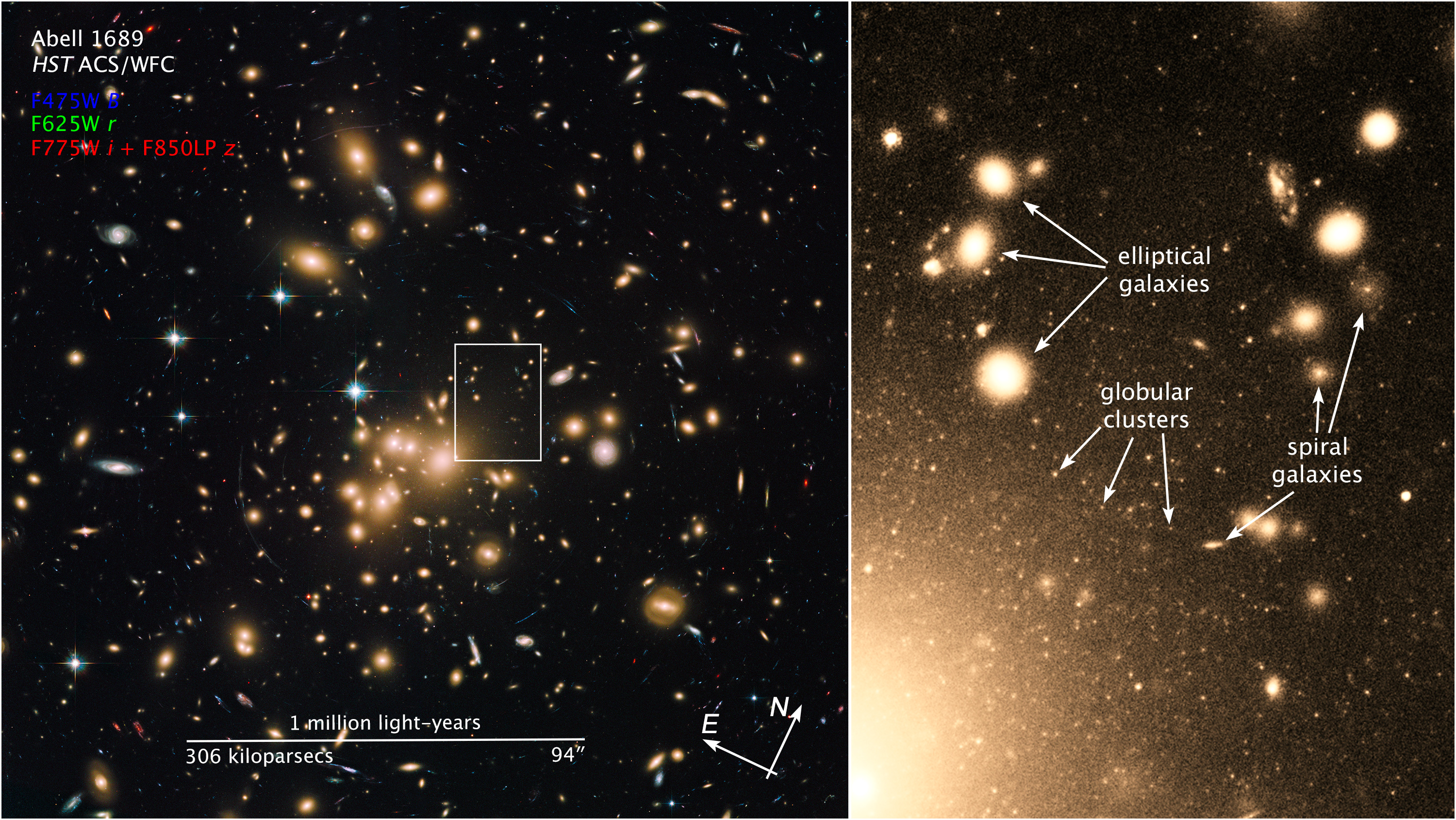
Globular clusters in Abell 1689

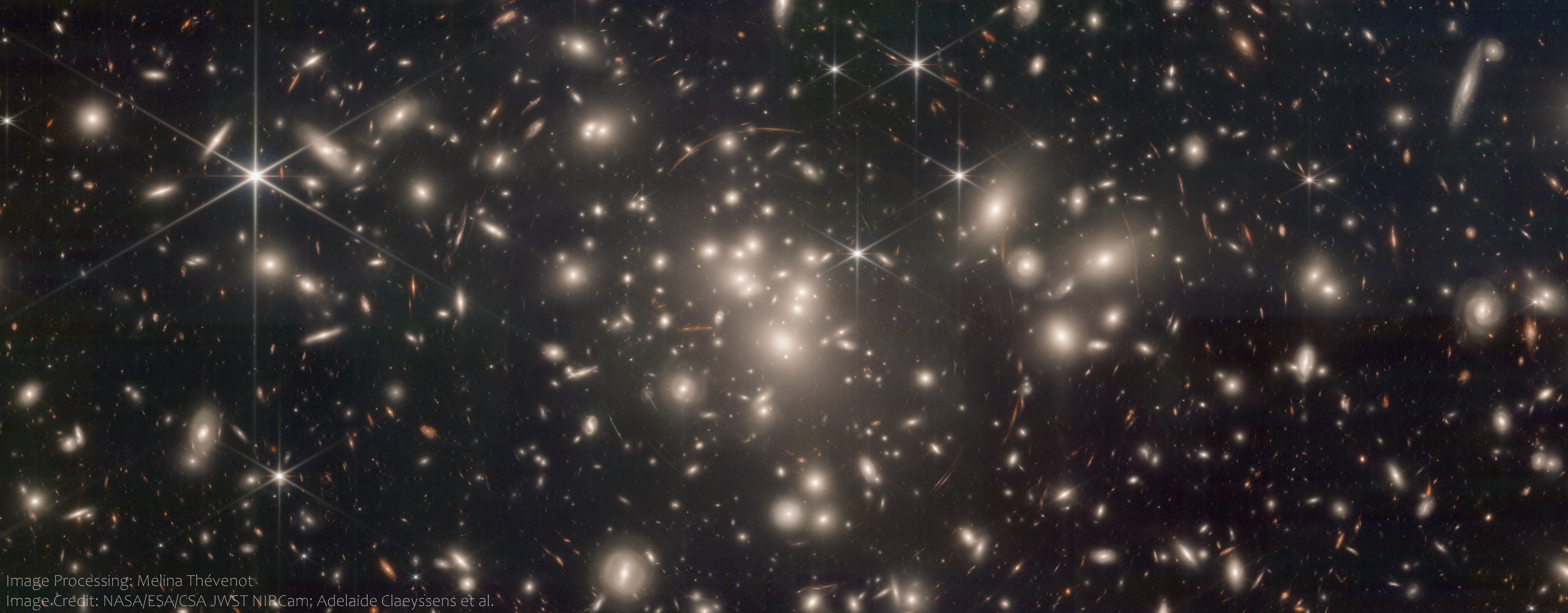
JWST NIRCam image of Abell 1689

== See also ==
- Abell catalogue
- Gravitational lensing
- List of Abell clusters
