= Goldfish galaxy =

Radio galaxy located in the constellation Draco

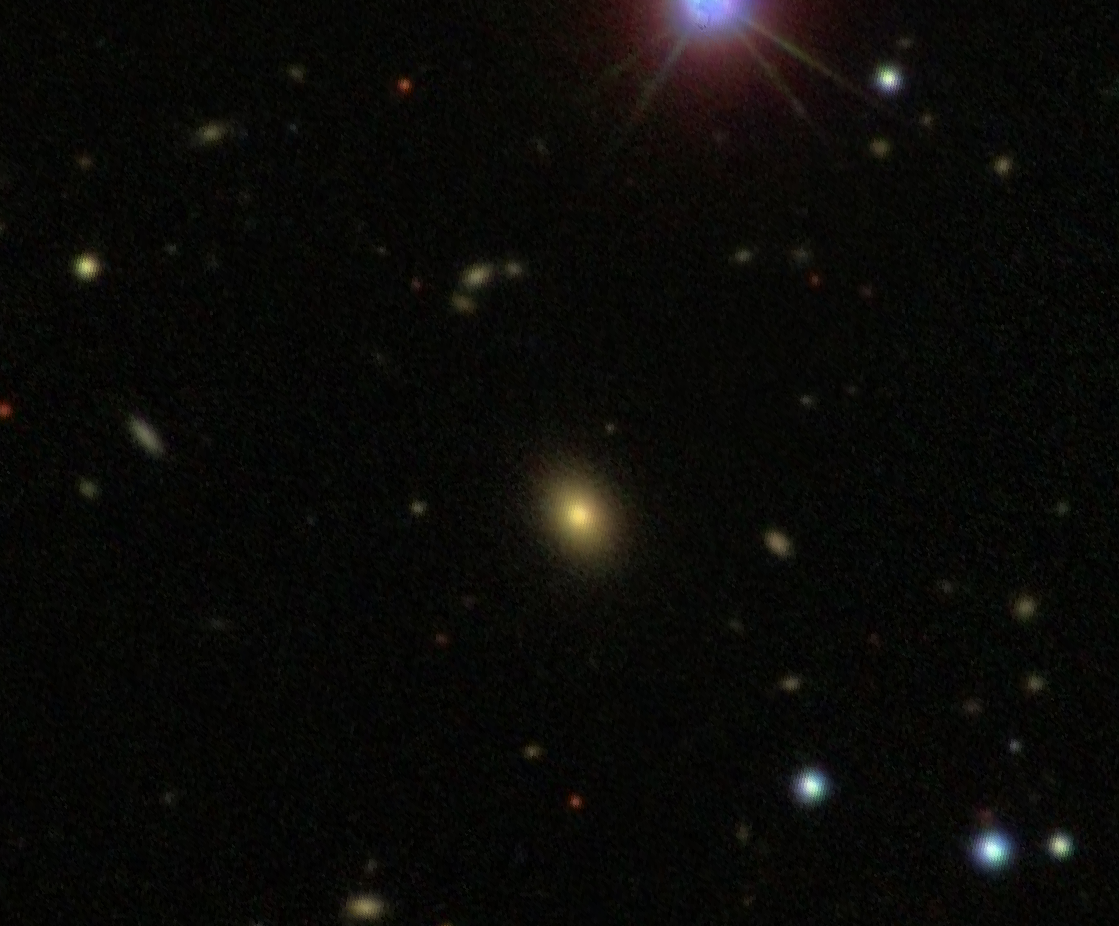
- SDSS image of the Goldfish galaxy

Observation data (J2000.0 epoch)
- Constellation: Draco
- Right ascension: 17^{h} 13^{m} 03.78^{s}
- Declination: +64° 07′ 01.71″
- Redshift: 0.080923
- Heliocentric radial velocity: 24,260 km/s ± 4
- Distance: 1,176.3 ± 82.4 Mly (360.67 ± 25.25 Mpc)
- Group or cluster: Abell 2255
- magnitude (J): 13.48

Characteristics
- Type: Radio galaxy
- Size: ~192,000 ly (58.9 kpc) (estimated)

Other designations
- 14W 118, 7C 1713+6407a, ABELL 2255:[DMM2003] 2, PGC 59858, SDSS J171303.78+640701.6, 2MASX J17130384+6407014

The Goldfish galaxy, also known as 7C 1713+6407a, is a radio galaxy located in the constellation of Draco. The redshift of the galaxy is z=0.080 and it was first discovered by astronomers in 1974 as an astronomical radio source whom they described it having a steep radio spectrum. It is considered to be a member of the rich galaxy cluster Abell 2255, alongside the Beaver galaxy, the Embryo galaxy, the Original TRG, and the Bean Galaxy.

== Description ==
The Goldfish galaxy is classified as an elliptical galaxy with an active galactic nucleus (AGN). It is a head-tail radio galaxy or alternatively a Fanaroff-Riley class type I narrow-tailed radio galaxy. When observed, it is found to have a weak tail feature. The head feature on the other hand, is shown little polarized by around 4%.

Radio imaging made at 1.4 GHz frequencies has found the head of the Goldfish galaxy as clearly resolved with two radio jets on opposite sides, one of them displaying a bend degree towards the east. A compact radio core is detected at 5 GHz frequencies. When imaged at 15 GHz, the nucleus and only the part of the northern jet is found. The tail feature of the Goldfish galaxy is shown to have an total extension of 261 kiloparsecs and further extended by around 180 kiloparsecs towards the direction of southeast. Earlier observations depicted the nucleus as unresolved.

Further observations at sub-arcsecond resolutions have detected traces of radio emission emitting out from the tail region of the Goldfish galaxy. Evidence also found the tail exhibits a helical morphology with jets appearing to spiral around each other before merging back into a single tail feature. A region of increased surface brightness is detected about 170 kiloparsecs away from the core region.
