= Beaver galaxy =

Radio galaxy in the constellation Draco

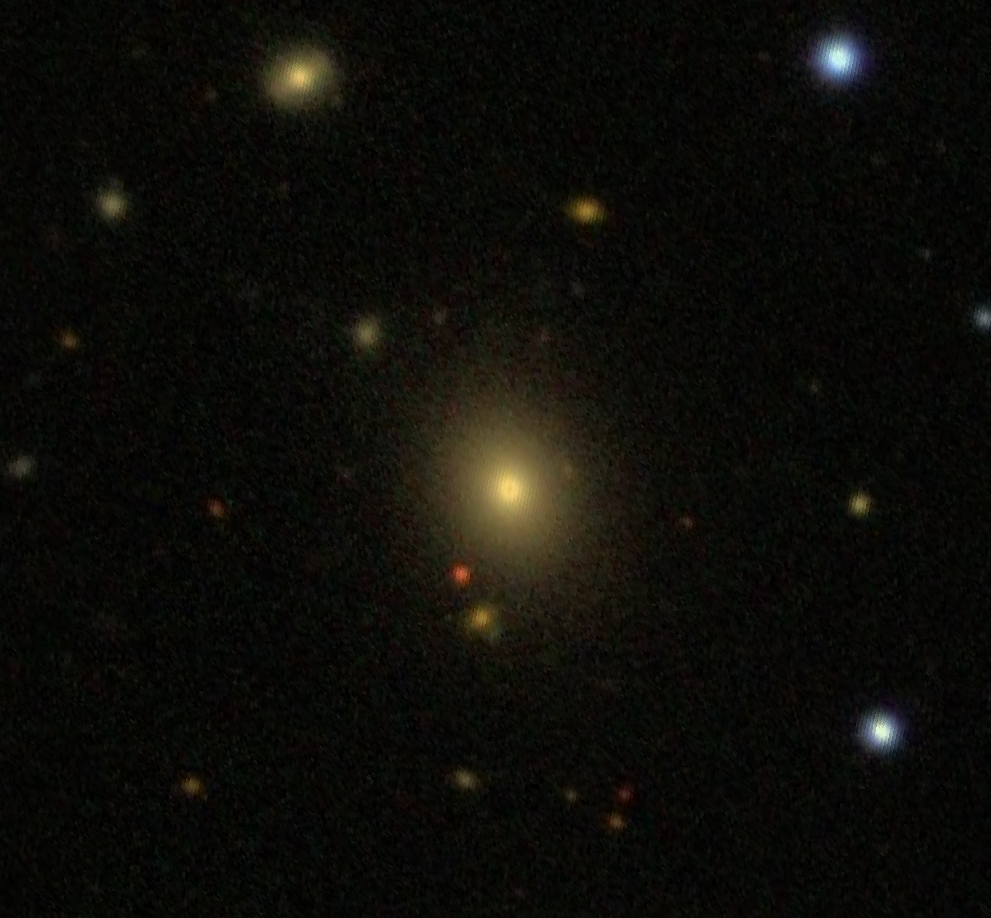
- SDSS image of the Beaver galaxy

Observation data (J2000.0 epoch)
- Constellation: Draco
- Right ascension: 17^{h} 13^{m} 16.00^{s}
- Declination: +63° 47′ 37.56″
- Redshift: 0.082955
- Heliocentric radial velocity: 24,869 km/s ± 4
- Distance: 1,205.6 ± 84.4 Mly (369.65 ± 25.88 Mpc)
- Group or cluster: Abell 2255
- magnitude (J): 12.97

Characteristics
- Type: Radio galaxy
- Size: ~362,000 ly (110.9 kpc) (estimated)

Other designations
- 14W 119, PGC 59867, 2MASX J17131603+6347378, 7C 1712+6352, 1712+638, ABELL 2255:[ZBO89] O4, [GMF2006] J1713.3+6347

The Beaver galaxy known as 7C 1712+6352 or 1712+638, is a radio galaxy located in the constellation of Draco. The redshift of the galaxy is (z) 0.082 and it was first discovered by astronomers in 1980. It is also considered to be a member of Abell 2255 alongside the Goldfish galaxy, Original TRG and the Embryo galaxy.

== Description ==
The Beaver galaxy is classified to be head-tail radio galaxy or alternatively, a narrow angle tail radio galaxy, positioned in the southern region away from the center of Abell 2255. When observed, the source is found to be extended over an area of 400 kiloparsecs with two regions of polarized emission located by 10 arcseconds west and northwest from the peak of the northern radio region, in the position angle of 90°. The tail feature of the Beaver galaxy has been described to have a long appearance and shown to drastically increase its length to around 1 megaparsec. It also exhibits signs of steepening of the spectral index indicating the electrons lost energy after being ejected from the host. The ages of the plasma of the tail end is estimated to be 2.2 × 10^{8} years.

Radio imaging made by Very Large Array (VLA), showed the presence of two radio jets bending backwards from the radio core of the Beaver galaxy. Evidence also found the inner regions of the jets displaying significant signs of polarization at 20 kiloparsecs from the core. However the eastern jet seems less polarized when imaged at 3.6 centimeters while the western jet is more polarized. The estimated fractional polarization of the eastern jet is 12% while the western jet has fractional polarization of 23%. Further radio observations also found both of the jets are shown closer to each other along the tail position, before subsequently forming a corkscrew feature. Observations at low frequencies, found the tail feature as twisted and fading away upon reaching the cluster radio emission halo.
