= B2 2249+37 =

Radio galaxy in the constellation Lacerta

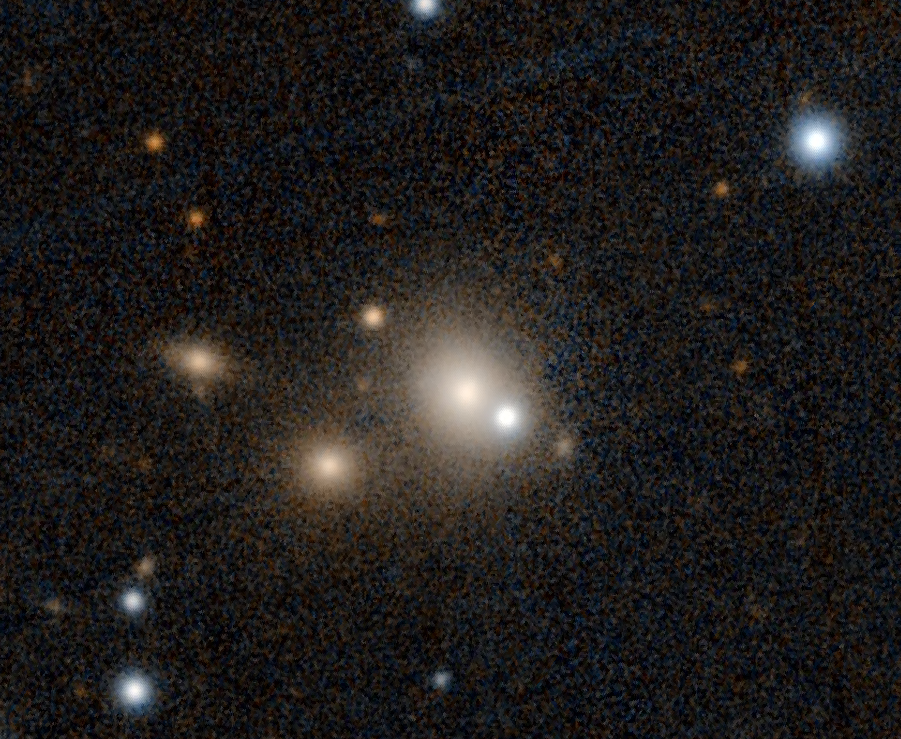
- Pan-STARRS image of B2 2249+37

Observation data (J2000 epoch)
- Constellation: Lacerta
- Right ascension: 22^{h} 51^{m} 24.45^{s}
- Declination: +38° 13′ 40.54″
- Redshift: 0.058701
- Heliocentric radial velocity: 17282 ± 22 km/s
- Distance: 856.8 ± 60.0 Mly (262.71 ± 18.39 Mpc)
- magnitude (J): 12.53
- magnitude (H): 11.97

Characteristics
- Size: ~163,000 ly (50.1 kpc) (estimated)

Other designations
- 4C +37.66, LEDA 2121306, IVS B2249+379, 2MASX J22512450+3813414

B2 2249+37 known as 4C 37.66, is a radio galaxy located in the constellation of Lacerta. The redshift of this object has been estimated as (z) 0.058 and it was first discovered by astronomers from a catalogue of astronomical radio sources in April 1980, whom they depicted the source as very compact and is associated with a 17 magnitude galaxy.

== Description ==
B2 2249+27 is classified as a head-tail radio galaxy located inside a galaxy cluster. The source has been found compact. When imaged with Very Large Array (VLA) in 1988, it has an almost resolved appearance with at least two detected components.

Another VLA observation made in 1993 would also show it has an extended radio halo feature shown clearly resolved based on radio mapping made at 5 GHz frequencies, with a flux density of 898 mJy. There is also a presence of a radio core with the total flux density being 29 mJy and a secondary core component. Detections of strong radio polarization is found, with levels reaching up to the maximum of 20%. The magnetic field has been found to be complex.

A study published in October 1995, would find the galaxy has a flat radio spectrum in the northeast direction. However, upon heading towards the southwest direction, the spectrum becomes more steeper, with the locations of the tail regions displaying low values.
