= Abell 133 =

Galaxy cluster in the constellation Cetus

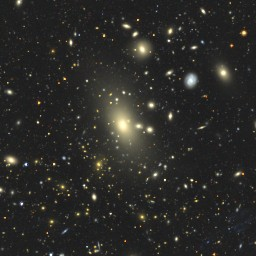
- Abell 133 as seen by Legacy Survey DR10

Observation data (Epoch J2000)
- Constellation: Cetus
- Right ascension: 01^{h} 02^{m} 39.0^{s}
- Declination: −21° 57′ 15″
- Brightest member: ESO 541-13
- Number of galaxies: 120
- Richness class: 0
- Bautz–Morgan classification: I
- Velocity dispersion: 735 km/s
- Redshift: 0.0566 (16 968 km/s)
- Distance: 234 Mpc (763 Mly) h^{−1}_{0.705}
- ICM temperature: 4.14 keV
- Binding mass: 3.17×10^{14} M_{☉}
- X-ray flux: 2.12×10^{−11} erg s^{−1} cm^{−2} (0.1–2.4 keV)

Other designations
- ACO 133; APMCC 138; PF 0104-2195; SCL 010 NED11

Abell 133 is a galaxy cluster in the Abell catalogue found in the original Abell Catalogue in the year of 1958, and is included in the Revised Abell Catalogue 1989. Abell 133 has 120-254 members that are dynamically confirmed members, by using redshifts identified using the Inamori-Magellan Areal Camera and Spectrograph (IMACS). Another paper suggests that Abell 133 has a richness class of 1, and a redshift of 0.0559, 0.058 to 0.0604. In Abell 133, there is only 1 central dominant galaxy (cD galaxy), which is ESO 541-13. The core radius of Abell 133 is about 0.30 Mpc (about 1 Million Light-years) or 13.3 arcseconds and its virial radius (r₂₀₀) is 1.60 Mega parsec. Abell 133 is a galaxy cluster filament in the Pisces–Cetus Supercluster together with Abell 85 and another 20 clusters. It was identified as a member of the Pisces–Cetus Supercluster by using survey redshifts from 2dF Galaxy Redshift Survey (2dFGRS), 6dF Galaxy Survey (6dFGS), Sloan Digital Sky Survey, NASA/IPAC Extragalactic Database and ZCAT. The cluster has a hot Intracluster medium (ICM), whose X-ray temperature is 4.0 keV, and also a Oxygen-to-Iron abundance ratio of 0.454 ± 0.071 (O/Fe), which is primarily enriched by a Type Ia supernova.

== Dynamics ==
A study found that Abell 133 is a galaxy cluster that has a very complex dynamics. Abell 133 has a Cooling flow core, where the center of the core is rapidly losing energy and is cooling down. A central radio source is detected, which means that at the center of Abell 133, there is an active galaxy that is hosting an Active Galactic Nuclei (AGN) and a large, diffuse filamentary cloud of radio emission or an unusual noncentral radio source has been detected, and is classified as a radio relic. This indicates Abell 133 has undergone a cosmic collision with another galaxy cluster or subcluster. The most prominent feature of Abell 133 is that in the center of Abell 133, there is 'tongue' of X-ray emitting gas (T ≈ 1.3 keV), extending from the cluster's cD galaxy (ESO 541-13), towards the northwest, partially overlapping the radio relic. The cause of the "tongue" formation is likely due to Kelvin-Helmholtz instability, which occurs when cold gas around the cD galaxy moves through the hot Intracluster medium (ICM) at a velocity of 400 km/s.

A study using the Einstein Observatory has been conducted and found that the Gas Mass M_{gas} of Abell 133 is 17.4 × 10¹² M☉, and the Total Mass M_{grav} of Abell 133 is 182 × 10¹² M☉, suggesting about 9.6% of Abell 133's total mass is physical matter, with the remaining 90.4% of matter is Dark matter. A recent analysis using the 6dF Galaxy Survey data found that there is no significant dynamical disturbance in Abell 133, and concluded that the 2 previous clumps identified have no kinematics differences with Abell 133. At a distance of ~300 kpc from Abell 133 BCG or cD galaxy, there is a filamentary structure with bluer colors than Abell 133's elliptical galaxies and there is a member of Abell 133 that is tidally disrupted. It is predicted that dwarf galaxies are disrupted efficiently and most of them do not survive for more than an orbit. A background cluster is projected along the same line of sight as the center of Abell 133. However, an analysis of the spatial distribution of faint galaxies confirms that low-mass galaxy population is associated with Abell 133, rather than the background cluster.

While in the early studies of Abell 133 have shown that in the outskirts of Abell 133, there are many gas clumps, but follow up studies have been conducted, showed that the gas clumps are background objects projected in along the field of view of Abell 133. The cluster itself shows little evidence of intrinsic inhomogeneity, directly support that is it dynamically relaxed and is not disturbed. The AGN strength of Abell 133 (P_{5GHz}) is ≤0.20, and the X-ray peak and the supermassive black hole is offset (ΔX_{5MHz}) by 1.40 ± 0.54 kpc, this suggests that the AGN of Abell 133 is in a quiescent state, as its strength is low despite the existence of the radio relic.

== Properties ==
At the center of Abell 133, the cluster's cD galaxy ESO 541-13 is a peculiar supergiant elliptical galaxy and has a diameter (kiloparsec) of 257.53, (over 840,000 light-years). ESO 541-13 is also classified as an ultra-steep spectrum (USS), which indicates that its radio emission is dominated by old, ageing electrons, that are much brighter at low frequencies than at high frequencies.

A kinematic study has been conducted, and it is found that Abell 133 has a Biweight Velocity Dispersion (S_{BI}) is 735 km/s. Abell 133 has a skewness of 0.140 and a tail index of 0.969, indicating that Abell 133 is a dynamically relaxed cluster. A pressure analysis has been conducted, and it is found that the radio relic in Abell 133 is strongly confined by the Intracluster medium (ICM). The pressure of the hot gas in Abell 133 (25.1 × 10^{−12} dyne cm^{−2}) is approximately four times higher than its internal pressure of the relic, which is (6.4 × 10^{−12} dyne cm^{−2}). Using the MJP model, reveals a break frequency of 73 MHz, indicates that it is mainly composed of aging electrons. Abell 133 also has a ratio of radiation age to continuous injection age of (t_{RE} / t_{CI} ≈ 1) and the effective diffusion coefficient of (D_{eff} = 0.08), indicating it is not entirely inactive fossil, and is experiencing re-acceleration. A deep Chandra study has been conducted, and is it found that there are 1617, 1324, 1028 point sources detected to a flux limit of 6.95 × 10^{−16} erg s^{−1} cm^{−2} using full, soft and hard bands.

A study found that the gas in Abell 133 becomes increasingly clumpy at a large radii, with a clumping factor of 2–3 beyond R₅₀₀. The gas temperature decreases outward of the center, while the entropy increases, suggesting that the central core has been heated, likelihood due to the Active Galactic Nuclei (AGN)'s feedback. A research has carried out, using the background quasar [VV98] J010250.2−220929 found no evidence of cold, cool or warm gas that is associated with the filament. This means that other than the X-ray emitting hot gas, no traces of other phases of gases have been found.

== Morphology ==
Another study suggests that Abell 133 is a dynamically disturbed cluster. The X-ray emission from Abell 133 is rather elliptical than circular, with the cool gas to be offset with the cD galaxy, and optical data reveals substructure in the galaxy distribution. Abell 133 has a bird-like morphology, with diffuse gas emission extending from its core forming a bird-like feature, likely uplifted by a buoyantly rising radio bubble, now identified as a radio relic. Abell 133 has been extensively studied by Chandra X-ray Observatory and Very Large Array (VLA), with a total of ~38 observations from 2000 October 13 to 2019 February 08 and a combined cleaned exposure of ~2.8 Ms. There has been evidence that there is a 1.6 Mega parsec background giant radio galaxy at z=0.293, the northern lobe of the background giant radio galaxy is overlapping with the X-ray relic in Abell 133, making the steep spectrum young relic source in Abell 133 unclear. The radio relic in Abell 133 has a length of 56 kpc, which is 182,648 light-year across.

A study of the velocity structure of the gas has been initiated, which found that there is no statistically significant velocity offset from the cluster's mean redshift (all Δz / σ_{z,tot} < 1). This supports the classification of Abell 133 as a dynamically relaxed cluster. A recent study of Chandra X-ray Observatory tracked two Supermassive black hole in dwarf galaxies that are ongoing cosmic collision in the galaxy cluster Abell 133, which is named "Mirabilis" after an endangered species of hummingbird that are known for their long tails.

== Gallery ==
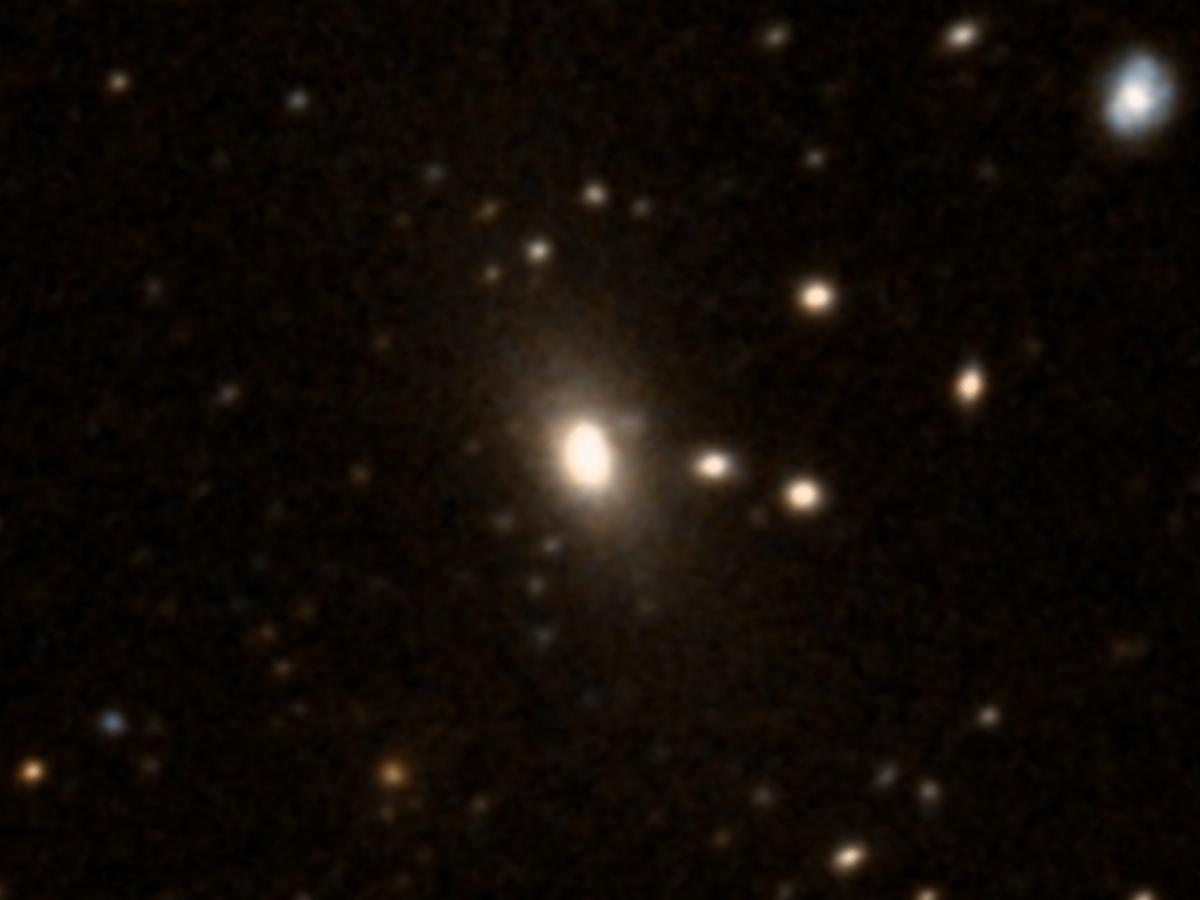
Abell 133 seen by Digitalize Sky Survey

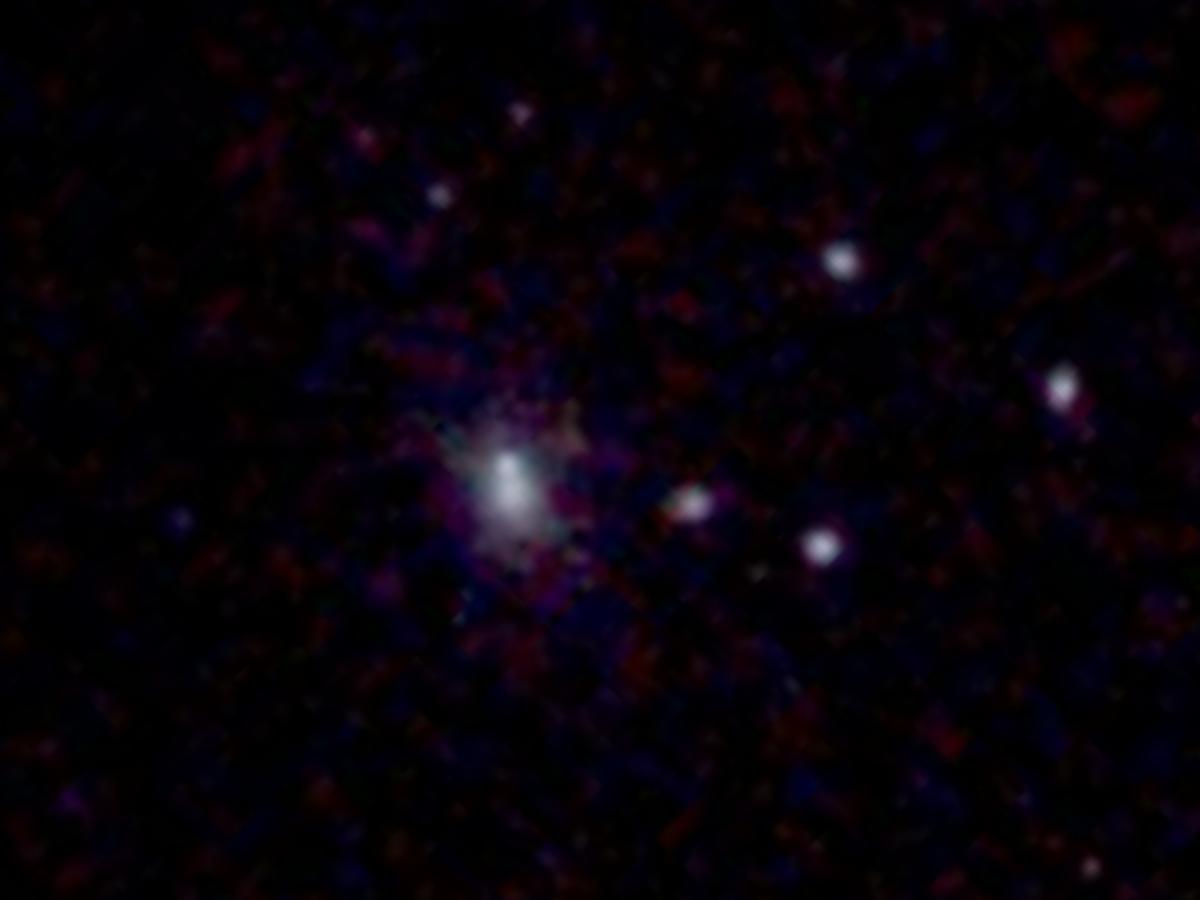
Abell 133 seen by 2 Micron All Sky Survey (2MASS)

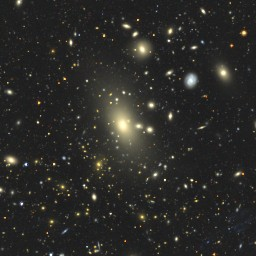
Abell 133 as seen by Legacy Survey DR10

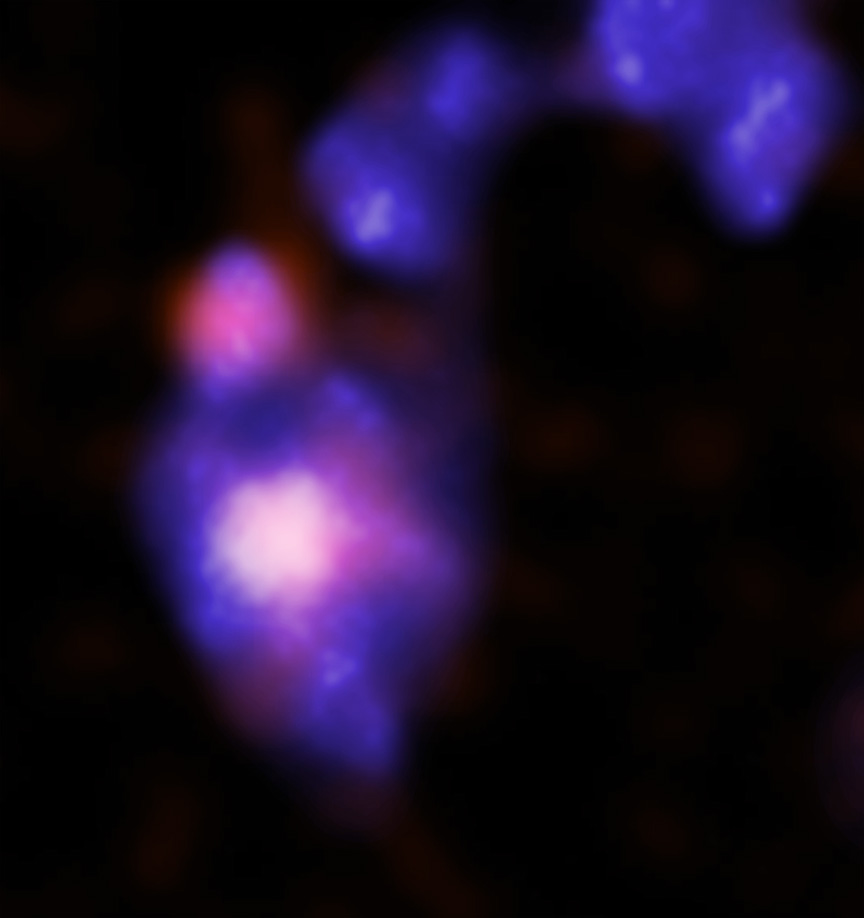
A pair of dwarf galaxies black hole's interacting as seen by Chandra X-ray Observatory

== See also ==
- List of Abell clusters
