= 3C 190 =

Quasar in the constellation of Cancer

Observation data (J2000.0 epoch)
- Constellation: Cancer
- Right ascension: 08^{h} 01^{m} 33.55^{s}
- Declination: +14° 14′ 43.03″
- Redshift: 1.195649
- Heliocentric radial velocity: ~163,400 km/s
- Distance: 8.655 Gly
- Apparent magnitude (V): 20.26
- Apparent magnitude (B): 21.07

Characteristics
- Type: RL1
- Size: ~154,000 ly (47.2 kpc) (estimated)

Other designations
- 4C +14.25, DA 242, G4Jy 0679, LEDA 2817584, NRAO 0278, OI +198, NVSS J080133+141442, SDSS J080133.55+141442.8, TXS 0758+143

3C 190 is a quasar located in the northern constellation of Cancer. The object has a redshift of (z) 1.195 and it was first discovered in 1959 as an astronomical radio source by astronomers. It was then identified with its counterpart in 1971. The radio spectrum of the object is found to be compact and steep, making it a compact steep spectrum quasar (CSS).

== Description ==
The radio source of 3C 190 is found to be very compact. When imaged with Very Long Baseline Interferometry (VLBI), it has three components displaying a steep spectrum and a bright compact radio core. But low-surface brightness radio emission is found undetected. Radio imaging made by both MERLIN and European VLBI Network showed there is a jet connecting to at least two components. This jet is suggestive of a one-sided structure. Further imaging also showed the jet emerges straight from the nucleus region in the west, then bends southwards by around 45°. Hotspot features and a radio bridge of emission is present. A faint extension feature is seen polarized.

The host galaxy of 3C 190 is an elliptical galaxy based on imaging. When observed, it is shown to have a low-surface brightness envelope surrounding it. Further evidence also pointed out the host galaxy is currently undergoing several galaxy mergers given there is an extension in a form of a tidal tail and a secondary tidal feature. This indicates it might become a type-cD galaxy in the future. Luminous knot features have been detected in the host galaxy according to imaging made by Hubble Space Telescope. The star formation rate of the quasar is estimated to be 4.7^{+0.2}_{−0.1} × 10^{2} M_{☉} yr^{−1}.

In December 2002, astronomers detected traces of H I absorption made of neutral hydrogen elements in 3C 190. Upon detection, the absorption features are mainly blueshifted by around 250 kilometers per seconds. This indicates the presence of multiple components with the peak's absorption being 647.728 MHz.
