= ESO 541-13 =

Type-cD galaxy in the constellation Cetus

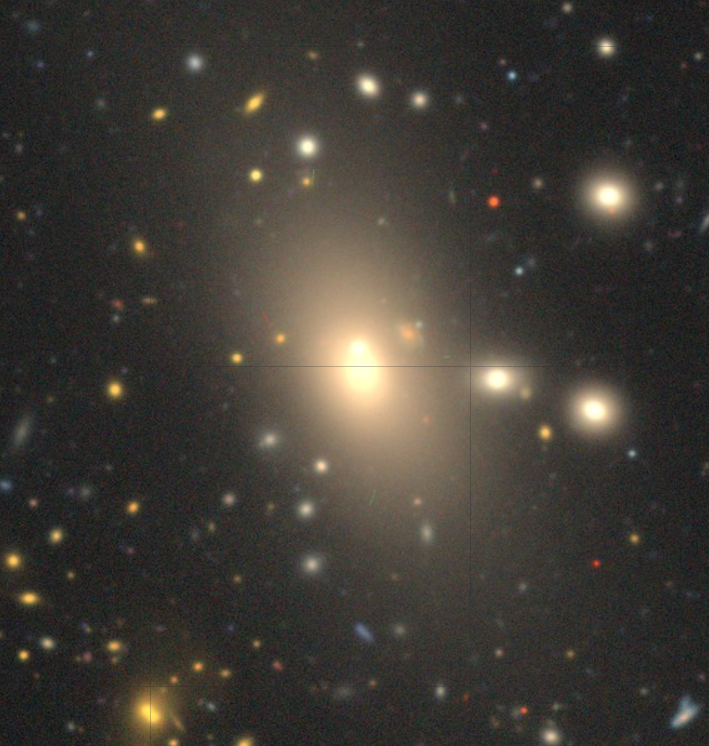
- DESI Legacy Surveys image of ESO 541-13

Observation data (J2000 epoch)
- Constellation: Cetus
- Right ascension: 01^{h} 02^{m} 41.74^{s}
- Declination: −21° 52′ 55.33″
- Redshift: 0.056949
- Heliocentric radial velocity: 17,073 km/s ± 28
- Distance: 821.5 ± 57.5 Mly (251.88 ± 17.64 Mpc)
- Group or cluster: Abell 133
- magnitude (J): 11.64

Characteristics
- Type: cD;E+3 pec
- Size: ~840,000 ly (257.53 kpc) (estimated)

Other designations
- 2MASX J01024177-2152557, ESO 541-G013, G4Jy 0113, PGC 3727, MCG -04-03-044

ESO 541-13 is a supergiant type-cD galaxy located in the constellation of Cetus. The redshift of the galaxy is (z) 0.056 and it was first discovered as a radio source in 1984, that is found to contain a steep radio spectrum, with the galaxy itself being coincident with the center of the radio component. It is the brightest cluster galaxy of the galaxy cluster, Abell 133.

== Description ==
ESO 541-13 is a Type-cD galaxy dominating the center of Abell 133. It is also a radio galaxy, with its source found mainly compact and is separated into four different components of which two of them are associated with the galaxy itself. The source is also classified as having a steep spectrum and has an amorphous appearance. An extension feature is also found south of the radio lobe feature of the source. There are also detections of radio emission that is mainly confined within the nucleus region by only a few arcseconds.

Observations made with Chandra X-ray Observatory found there is a tongue of emission described as extending outwards from the galaxy towards the northwest direction where it is found to overlap together with a radio relic, although partly. Evidence also showed the emission is also of thermal type, originating from cool interstellar gas. This is found likely to be produced through Kelvin-Helmholtz instabilities between the cold gas of the galaxy and also the hot intracluster medium. The central supermassive black hole of the galaxy is estimated to be 3.0 × 10^{9} M_{☉}.

Evidence found the galaxy has hydrogen-alpha emission described as extended. The stellar population of the galaxy is mainly made up of two types; stars with an upper limit of around 20 billion years old and very young stars that are less than 100 million years old, with them contributing the light at 20%.
