= Marcus Brüggen =

German astronomer

- Born: November 25, 1972 (age 53); Cologne, Germany
- Education: Cambridge University (BA, PhD)
- Known for: Radio relics, low-frequency radio astronomy
- Scientific career
- Fields: Astrophysics
- Workplaces: University of Hamburg
- Doctoral advisor: Douglas Gough

Marcus Brüggen (born 25. November 1972 in Cologne) is a German high-energy astrophysicist and full professor at the University of Hamburg. His research includes the exploration of the low-frequency radio sky, in particular the study of phenomena such as feedback by active galactic nuclei in galaxy clusters and diffuse radio sources, so-called radio relics and radio halos, in galaxy clusters. He studies the origin and properties of cosmic magnetic fields, the acceleration and transport of cosmic rays, the cycle of baryons, active galactic nuclei and properties of Dark Matter.

Most recently, his group has worked on megahalos, a sky map at low radio frequencies and the nature of supersonic turbulence.

Brüggen has also taken an interest in the development of machine learning techniques for astronomy. In the excellence cluster, he is a coordinator for gravitational wave research. With S. Rosswog he has published a textbook "Introduction to High-energy Astrophysics".

He was the driving force behind establishing LOFAR in Germany.

Brüggen has been active in popularising science and astronomy. He has appeared on national TV, including the popular talk show DAS, scobel as well as podcasts. In recent years he has also promoted citizen science for astronomical research.

== Education ==
Marcus Brüggen went to Trinity College and received his bachelor, masters and PhD degrees from Cambridge University.

He was a Junior Research fellow at Churchill College, Cambridge and a postdoctoral fellow at the Max-Planck Institute for Astrophysics in Garching, Germany. He was a founding faculty of the private Jacobs University in Bremen, Germany before he joined the University of Hamburg.
