= OI 287 =

Quasar in the constellation Gemini

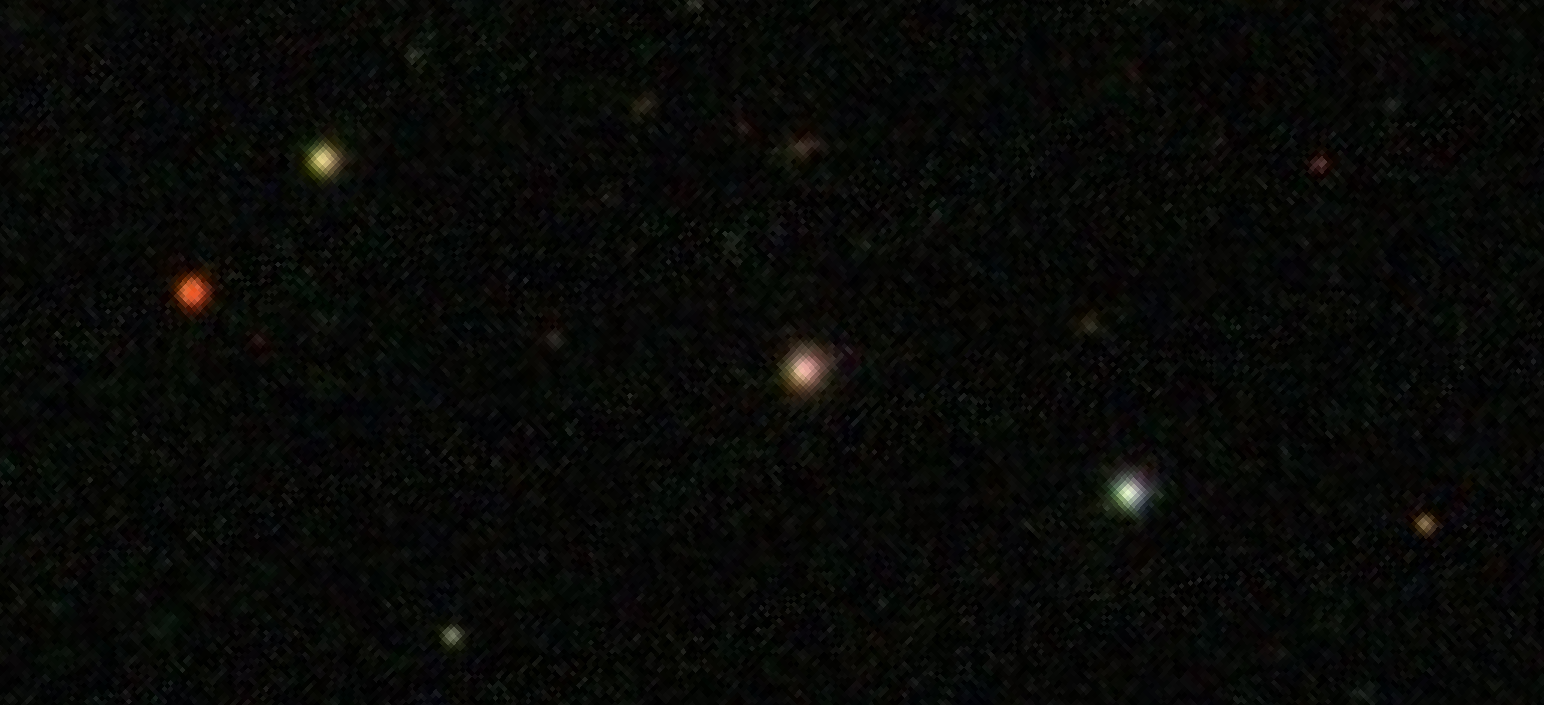
- SDSS image of OI 287

Observation data (J2000.0 epoch)
- Constellation: Gemini
- Right ascension: 07^{h} 55^{m} 37.03^{s}
- Declination: +25° 42′ 39.02″
- Redshift: 0.444241
- Heliocentric radial velocity: 133,180 km/s ± 12
- Distance: 4.779 Gly
- Apparent magnitude (V): 18.04
- Apparent magnitude (B): 18.50

Characteristics
- Type: BLLAC
- Size: ~240,000 ly (73.7 kpc) (estimated)

Other designations
- B2 0752+25A, NVSS J075537+254236, SDSS J075537.02+254238.9, THING 587732156852142361, 2MASS J07553702+2542389 LEDA 3506791

OI 287 is a quasar located in the constellation of Gemini. The redshift of the object is (z) 0.444 and it was first discovered as a highly polarized object by astronomers in January 1981, but it also has been classified as a blazar in a 1982 study.

== Description ==
The source of OI 287 has a double-lobed structure based on Very Large Array (VLA) observations made in 1984, however at that time it was unresolved. Radio maps made at 20 and 6 centimeters (cm), would reveal the source has a twin-jet structure, depicted as oscillating. The radio spectrum of the source also has a steep appearance between frequencies of 0.36 and 5 GHz. There is a radio core present with an inverted spectrum between 1.4 and 5 GHz but no variability of its flux density. The core is lowly polarized with polarization levels of only 0.25%.

The host galaxy of OI 287 has a circular appearance with an M-R apparent magnitude of -23.0 based on optical imaging. However a study published in 1998, suggested it has a disk morphology when observed through near-infrared imaging, displaying the presence of radio emission. The host is also described as slightly elongated towards its companion located 4.9 kiloparsecs away from it.

The optical spectrum of OI 287 shows the presence of rich emission lines featuring both narrow and broad Balmer components, as well as detections of doubly ionized oxygen [O III] emission. The optical continuum of the spectrum is found to be increasing sharply towards the near-infrared, but gets flatter at around 10 microns. A broad-line region was located inside the quasar, described as having an obscured appearance, with its accretion disk also likely obscured as well. The mass range of the torus is 10^{5}–10^{7} M_{☉} and the total thickness of the narrow-line region is approximately 2 × 10^{−8} parsecs. The supermassive black hole located in the center of OI 287 has an estimated mass of 1.46^{+1.89}_{−0.82} × 10^{9} M_{☉}.
