= B3 0651+428 =

Bl Lacertae object located in the constellation Auriga

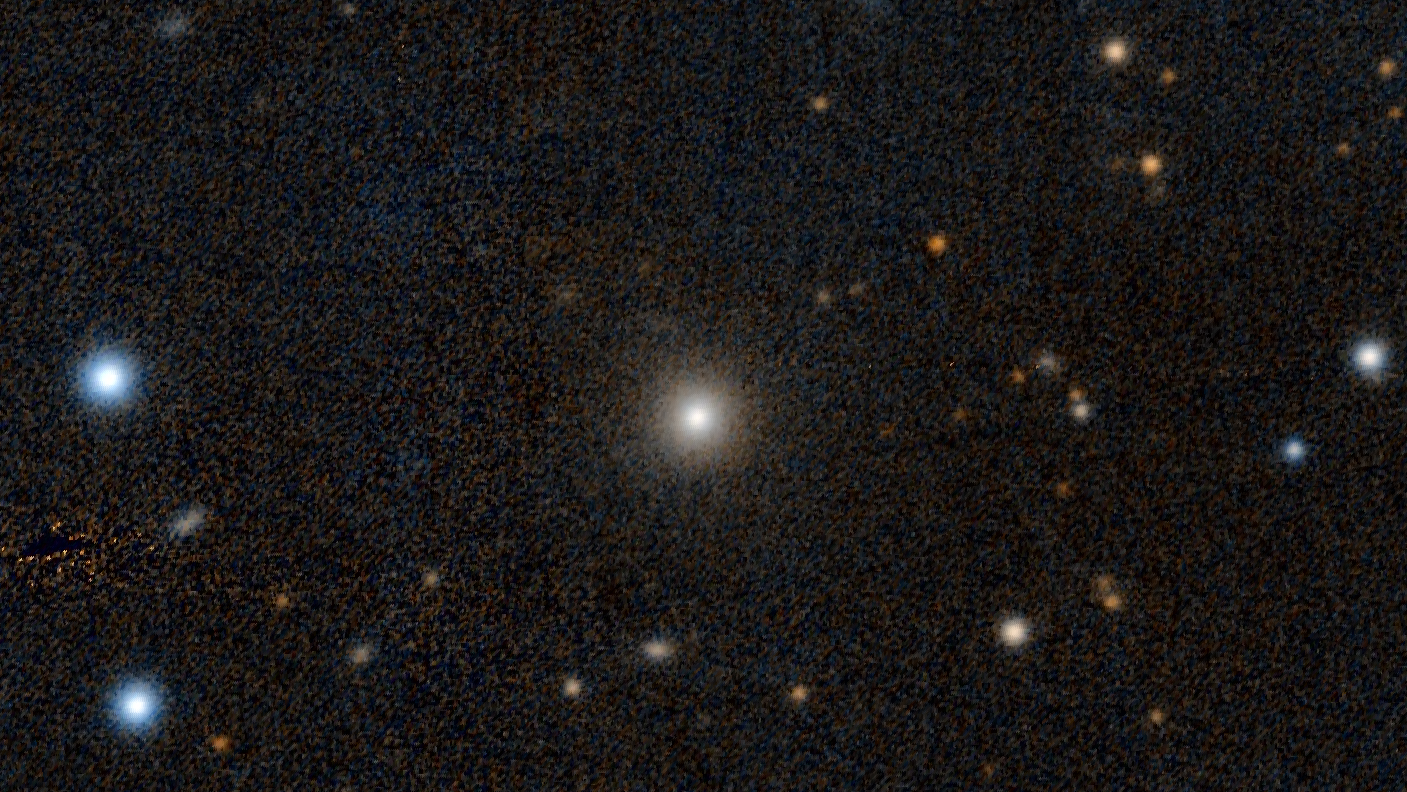
- Pan-STARRS image of B3 0651+428

Observation data (J2000.0 epoch)
- Constellation: Auriga
- Right ascension: 06^{h} 54^{m} 43.52^{s}
- Declination: +42° 47′ 58.73″
- Redshift: 0.126000
- Heliocentric radial velocity: 37774 ± 600 km/s
- Distance: 1,818.0 ± 133.6 Mly (557.40 ± 40.97 Mpc)
- magnitude (J): 14.07
- magnitude (H): 13.42

Characteristics
- Type: BLLAC
- Size: ~224,000 ly (68.7 kpc) (estimated)

Other designations
- LEDA 2206435, 2MASX J06544356+4247588, 6C B065111.5+425203, VAS J0654+4247, 7C 0651+4251, 2MASS J06544352+4247587, RX J0654.6+4247

B3 0651+428 is a BL Lacertae object located in the northern constellation of Auriga. The redshift of the object is estimated to be (z) 0.126 and it was first discovered as an astronomical radio source by astronomers in July 1996 and such is found to contain a radio spectrum that is flat, thus being classified as a flat spectrum source.

== Description ==
B3 0651+428 is classified to be an elliptical galaxy based on R-band imaging, orientated at 146° with the total magnitude being 15.98 ± 0.04 and has an effective radius of 4.8 ± 0.1 arcseconds. The optical spectrum of the galaxy mainly contains Lyman-alpha and ionized neon emission with the source shown to be mildly polarized at around 2%.

The source of the galaxy is compact and it has a core and jet morphology based on observations made with Very Long Baseline Interferometry (VLBI). When observed on parsec scales, it has a resolved radio core and a radio jet that is shown on one side.

The jet is estimated to have an extension of around 40 milliarcseconds from the direction of the core with a measured position angle of -146°. Radio imaging at 5 GHz frequencies, also showed the jet has a collimated appearance that reaches up to about 15 milliarcseconds away from the core position. There is a presence of a jet knot feature shown as polarized by 9% with its electric vector position angle mainly in parallel direction towards the jet. A study suggested the core is the brightest known component.
