= NGC 6331 =

Galaxy in the constellation Ursa Minor

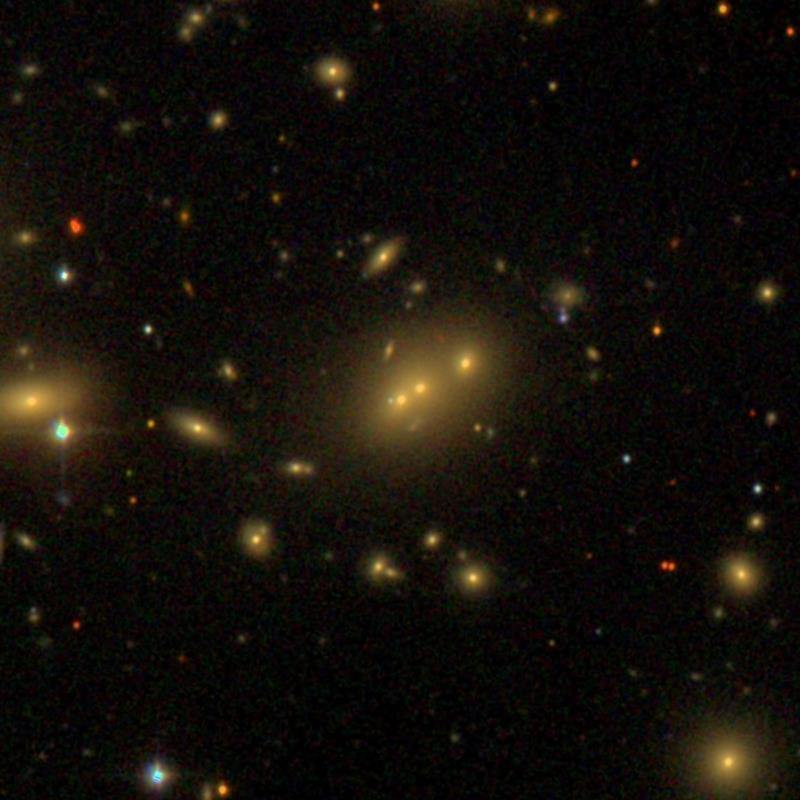
- SDSS image of NGC 6331

Observation data (J2000 epoch)
- Constellation: Ursa Minor
- Right ascension: 17h 03m 35.97s
- Declination: +78d 37m 44.40s
- Redshift: 0.053614 0.00150
- Heliocentric radial velocity: 17,570 km/s
- Distance: 737 Mly (226 Mpc)
- Group or cluster: Abell 2256
- Apparent magnitude (V): 14.4

Characteristics
- Type: E
- Size: 345,000 ly

Other designations
- PGC 84830, 2MASX J17033591+7837435, SDSS J170335.88+783744.0, NSA 167203, WBL 631-001, CGCG 355-024, MCG +013-12-015

NGC 6331 is a type E elliptical galaxy located in the constellation Ursa Minor. It is located 737 million light-years from the Solar System and was discovered by German-British astronomer William Herschel on December 20, 1797, utilizing an 18.7-inch f/13 spectrum telescope but also observed by Guillaume Bigourdan.

With an approximate diameter of 345,000 light-years, NGC 6331 is well considered one of the largest galaxies. It is the brightest group member of Abell 2256 and first in 6' string to the east, making up of 6 galaxies. NGC 6331 also makes up a part of the galactic triplet CGCG 355-024 which comprises two other elliptical galaxies in the cluster, CGCG 355-024 NED03 (PGC 59513) and CGCG 355-024 NED01 (PGC 84827).
