= B2 0806+35 =

Bl Lacertae object in the constellation Lynx

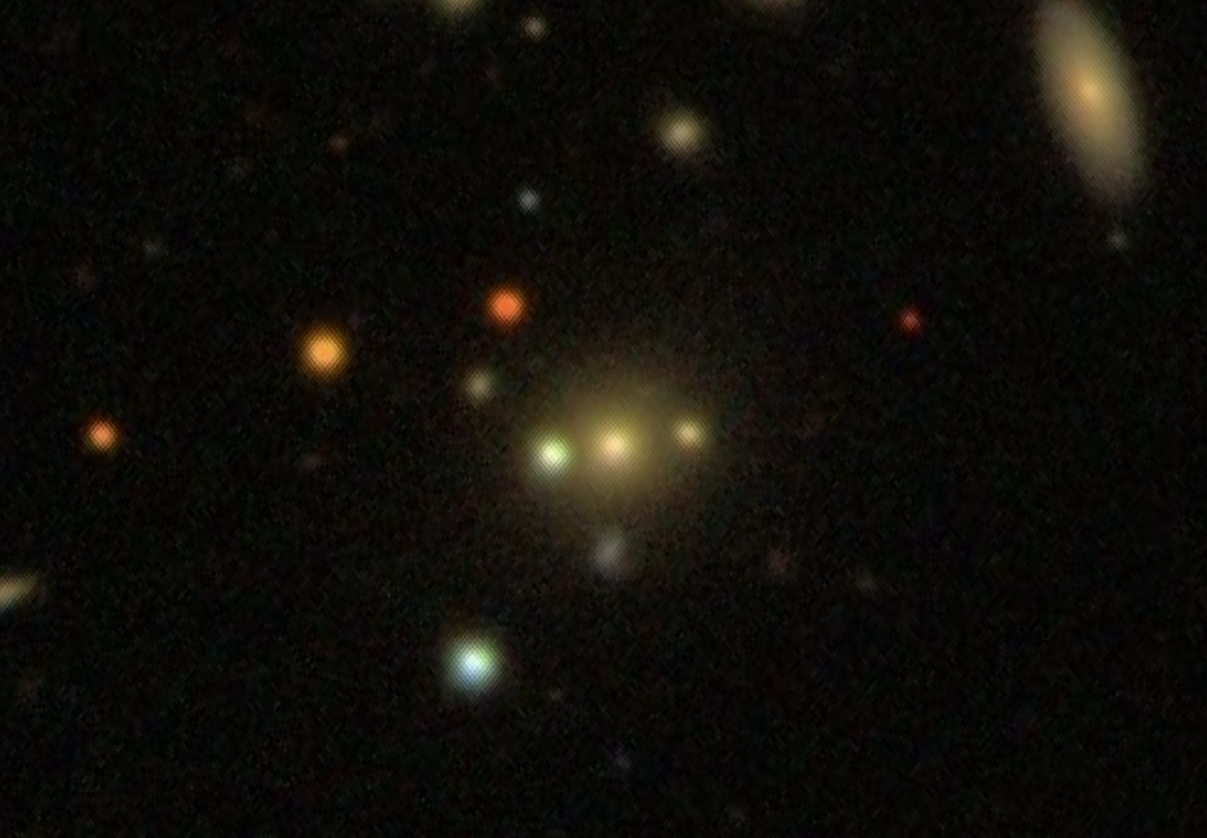
- SDSS image of B2 0806+35.

Observation data (J2000.0 epoch)
- Constellation: Lynx
- Right ascension: 08^{h} 09^{m} 38.88^{s}
- Declination: +34° 55′ 37.26″
- Redshift: 0.082493
- Heliocentric radial velocity: 24,731 km/s ± 6
- Distance: 1.191 Gly (365.40 Mpc)
- Apparent magnitude (V): 17.42

Characteristics
- Type: BrClG;Cand. BLLAC
- Size: ~187,200 ly (57.40 kpc) (estimated)

Other designations
- 2MASX J08093889+3455372, IERS B0806+350, LEDA 3084703, RBS 0691, VIPS 0076, SDSS J080938.88+345537.2, VLSS J0809.6+3455

B2 0806+35 is a BL Lacertae object located in the constellation of Lynx. The redshift of the object is (z) 0.082 and it was first discovered as an astronomical radio source by astronomers who were conducting the B2 survey in May 1972. This object has also been classified as a blazar in literature.

== Description ==
B2 0806+35 is known to contain a compact radio source. When observed by Very Long Baseline Array (VLBA), it is found to have a two-side radio structure on kiloparsec scales with an approximate extension of around 90 arcseconds and orientated in north to south direction. Imaging on parsec-scales, found there is a radio jet on side of the source that shows an extension of 10 milliarcseconds. There are also presence of radio emission in the source, detected both in kiloparsec and parsec scale imaging. The radio spectrum of the source appears as very steep. There are no evidence of polarized emission in the jet.

The radio core of B2 0806+35 is well detected and is shown to contain a flat radio spectrum. Like the jet, it has no signs of polarized emission. A northern extension is found in the source, confirming the fact the source also displays asymmetric brightness. The jet of the source is shown to have flux density of 24 mJy at low frequencies and around 14.3 mJy at higher frequencies.

B2 0806+35 is also classified as an active blazar. When observed in 2010, it was found to display gamma ray emission that was shown to have a measured flux of (6.7 ± 2.5) × 10^{−10} photons cm^{−2} s^{−1} when measured in the energy range of between 1 and 100 GeV. It was also shown to have an X-ray flux measuring around 4.07 × 10^{−12} erg cm^{−2} s^{−1}.
