= 3C 99 =

Seyfert 2 galaxy in the constellation Taurus

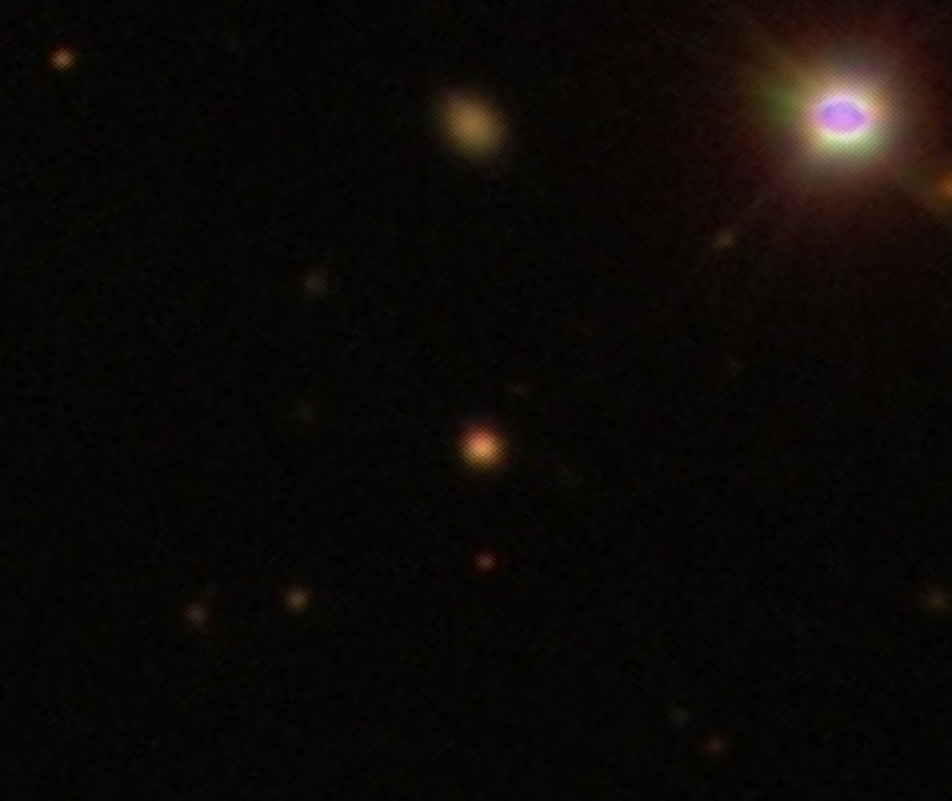
- 3C 99 captured by SDSS

Observation data (J2000.0 epoch)
- Constellation: Taurus
- Right ascension: 04^{h} 01^{m} 07.59^{s}
- Declination: +00° 36′ 32.39″
- Redshift: 0.426000
- Heliocentric radial velocity: 127,712 km/s ± 0
- Distance: 4.625 Gly
- Apparent magnitude (V): 19.01
- Apparent magnitude (B): 20.20

Characteristics
- Type: N galaxy; HEG Sy2
- Size: ~74,000 ly (22.68 kpc) (estimated)

Other designations
- 0358+004, LEDA 2817528, 4C +00.14, DA 121, G4Jy 0406, NRAO 0153, NVSS J040107+003633, PAPER J060.29+00.52, OE +097, 2MASS J04010760+0036324, 87GB 035832.9+002802

3C 99 is a Seyfert type 2 galaxy located in the constellation of Taurus. Its redshift is (z) 0.426 and it was first discovered as an astronomical radio source in 1959 by astronomers. This object has also been designated as PKS 0358+00 in the Parkes Survey and categorized as a high-excitation radio galaxy (HEG) or an N galaxy in literature.

== Description ==
3C 99 is classified as a strong doubled-lobed source and low frequency variable object. It has a radio spectrum that appears as steep. When observed with MERLIN at 408 MHz, it was shown to have two components that are connected via a radio emission bridge. It's active galactic nucleus (AGN) is as radio-loud.

Imaging with Very Long Baseline Interferometry (VLBI), has found both central and eastern components with a total angular resolution of around 11 × 3 milliarcseconds^{2}. There are also emission blob features present inside the central component, with two of them being misaligned with the source's axis. A bright radio component is found, suggesting the central component has a nucleus. The jet region is polarized to a slight degree.

Further studies have confirmed 3C 99 is a compact steep spectrum (CSS) source. When observed on arcsecond scales, the source is found to contain a triple radio structure with further components of asymmetrical positions and of different surface brightness. There is a one-sided radio jet described as straight and collimated, connecting both the core region and hotspot feature on the northeast side. The jet also has a bent appearance and it increases slightly before reaching the hotspot region. The estimated dynamical age of the source is around 4 × 10^{5} years. In the galaxy's optical spectrum, there are narrow permitted lines. An extended emission-line region (EELR) was discovered in 3C 99.
