= Abell 2255 =

Galaxy cluster in the Draco constellation

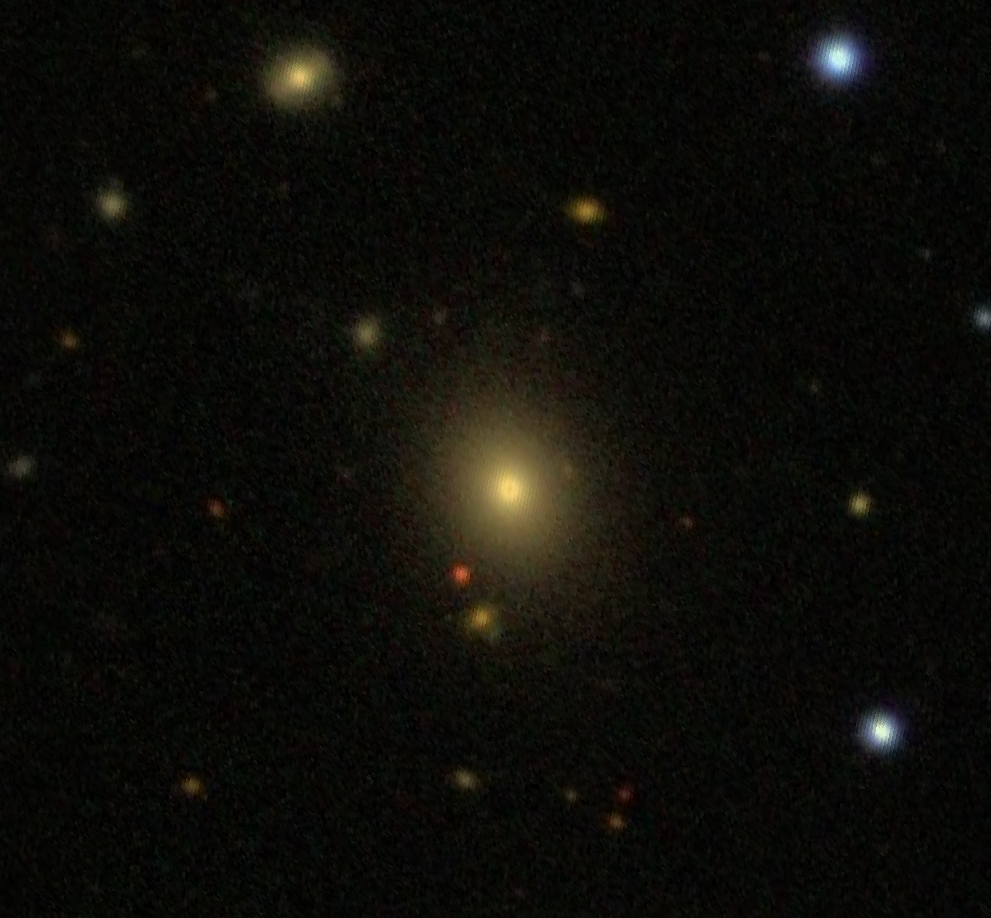
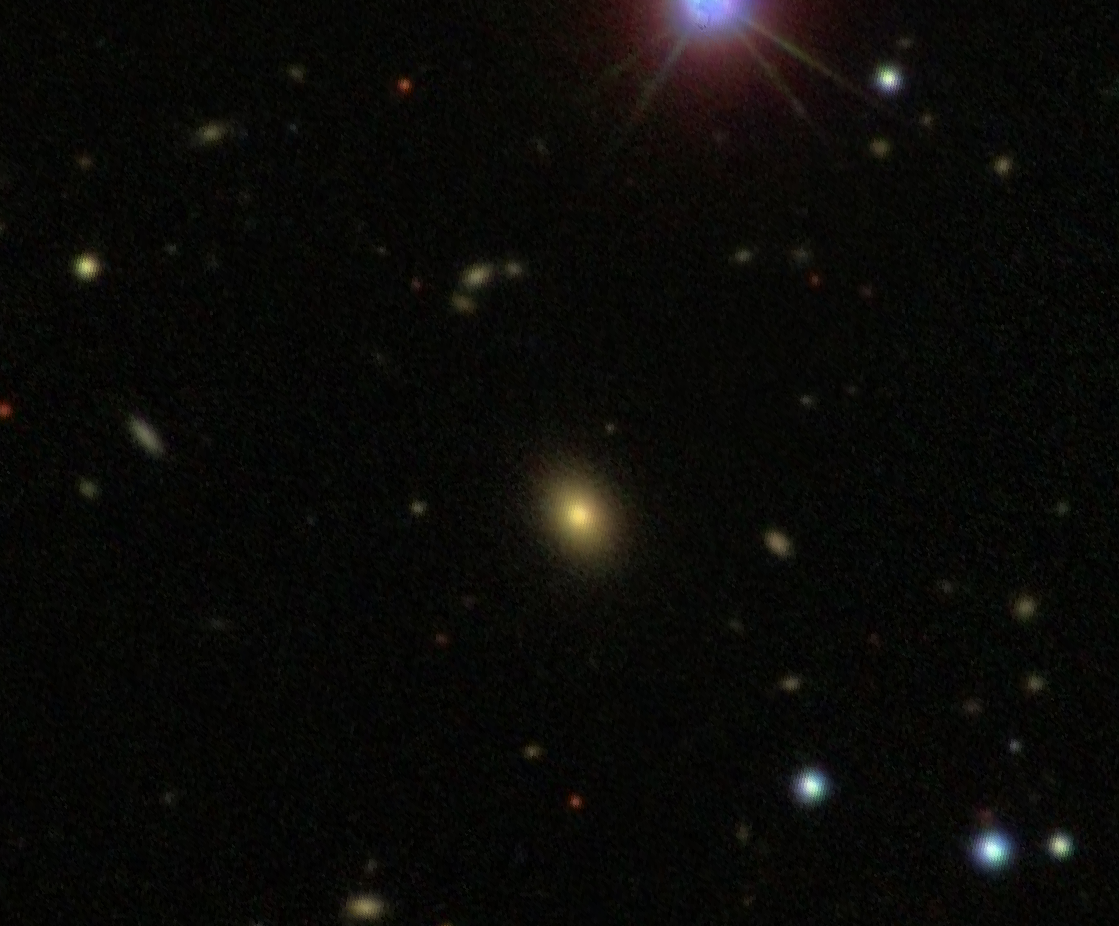
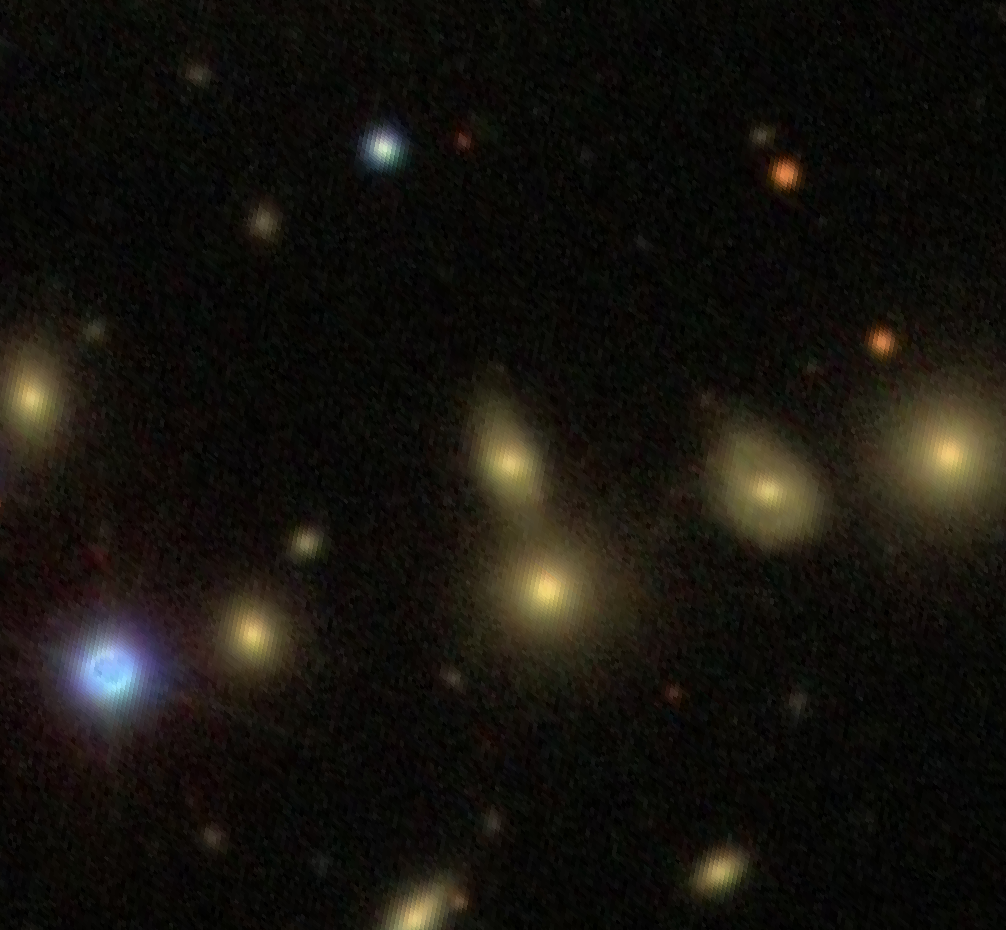
- Images of various galaxies belonging to Abell 2255. The Beaver galaxy (top left), the Goldfish galaxy (top right) and the Original TRG (bottom).

Observation data (Epoch J2000)
- Constellation: Draco
- Number of galaxies: 300-500
- Redshift: 0.0806
- Distance: Z=0.0806
- Notable features: Chaotic intracluster medium and Original TRG galaxy

Other designations
- A2255

Abell 2255 (often shortened to A2255) is a rich galaxy cluster located at a relatively nearby distance of redshift z=0.0806 in the Constellation of Draco. It contains some 300-500 galaxies. It has a radius that spans 16.3 million light years. The cluster contains a dense environment with a chaotic intracluster medium (ICM) that contains shocks, turbulent filaments, intense magnetic fields and other phenomenon.

X-ray observations of the temperature asymmetries of the clusters intracluster medium (ICM) from XMM-newton indicate that it had recently gone through a merger event with another galaxy cluster around 0.15 billion years ago.

== Contents ==
Abell 2255 contains several notable galaxies such as the Beaver Galaxy, Double Galaxy, Embryo Galaxy, Goldfish Galaxy and the Original TRG.

=== Intracluster medium ===
The cluster of Abell 2255 is known to not be smooth but is instead a messy and intricate system of large galactic filaments, radio galaxies, radio halos, turbulent intracluster mediums, relativistic particles, strong magnetic fields and etc.

==== Filamentary structures ====
It has been found that this cluster had elongated filamentary structures that stretch from 260,000-360,000 light years. For comparison, these filaments are over three times the width of the Milky Way. However the thickness of these filaments and less than a tenth of the width of the Milky Way galaxy. The turbulent motion within the galaxy cluster of Abell 2255 caused the formation of these filaments. Then they mixed with the dust and gas within the intracluster medium.

==== Radio halo ====
Located towards the center of the galaxy cluster are a large number of head-tail radio galaxies along a radio halo that was one of the first radio halos detected in the interacted medium. It has a complex structure. The origin of this radio halo is still unknown. The main difficulty explaining of the radio halo is its size which is up to 1 Mpc in size.

==== Magnetic fields ====
Abell 2255 has a magnetic field that extends towards the outskirts of the cluster. However the magnetic field is over 100 times denser than expected from primordial magnetic fields. The magnetic field accelerates particles to speeds near the speed of light speed which, in turn, helps amplify the magnetic field.

==== Relativistic particles ====
It also contains many relativistic particles moving at speeds close to the speed of light emitting radiation in the radio band when interacting with the magnetic fields of Abell 2255. Kinetic energy from shocks and turbulence efficiently transfer energy into these particles helping them reach their fast speeds. Another factor accelerating particles are the dense magnetic fields of Abell 2255.

It is likely that the acceleration of these particles occur once they leave their galaxy and enter the radio components of them.
