= Abell 2256 =

Galaxy cluster in the constellation Ursa Minor

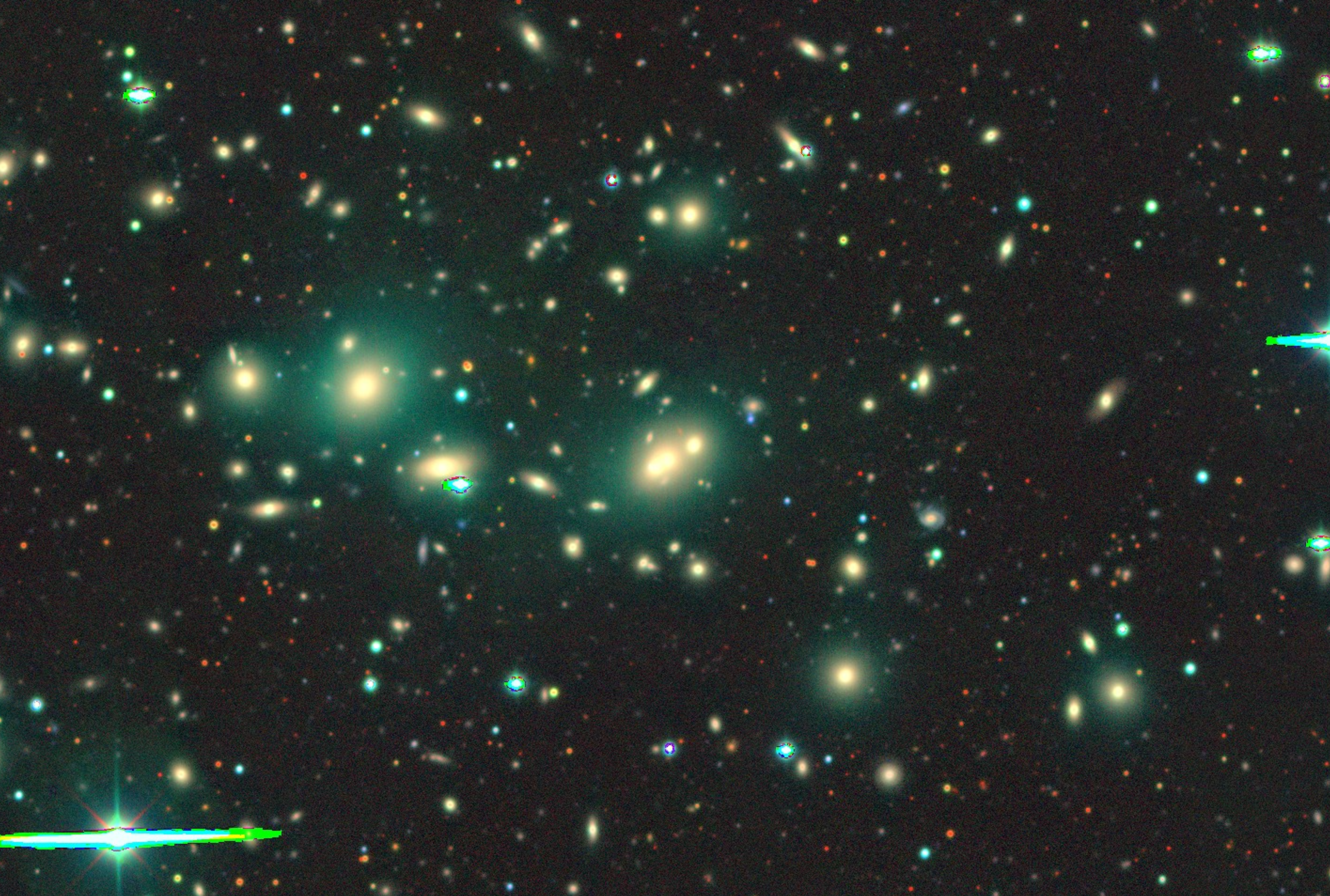
- Abell 2256 seen by DESI Legacy Surveys DR11

Observation data (Epoch J2000)
- Constellation: Ursa Minor
- Right ascension: 17^{h} 03^{m} 43.5^{s}
- Declination: +78° 43′ 03″
- Richness class: 1
- Velocity dispersion: 3.105 km/s
- Redshift: 0.058100 (17 418 km/s)
- Distance: 237.250 ± 13.066 MPC

Other designations
- Abell 2256; ABELL 2256; UGCl 411; ZwCl 1653.9+7856; SCL 168 NED02

Abell 2256 is a rich, X-ray Luminous nearby galaxy cluster in the Abell catalogue that exhibits a population of ~ 100 – 200 kpc long steep spectrum synchrotron filaments surrounding the cluster center with significant evidence of merger activity deduced by the presence of two separate X-ray peaks in the X-ray surface brightness distribution. One feature is a radio 'relic'. The other striking feature in the cluster is a long tail whose morphology suggests it is either a one-sided jet or a twin-tail structure. The bending of the tails takes place very near the galaxy core where one might expect little impact from the galaxy's motion through the intergalactic medium, unless the parent galaxy has undergone extreme stripping.

Abell 2256 is located in the Supercluster 168 or SCL 168 that consists of 5 members, which are Abell 2248, Abell 2271, Abell 2296, Abell 2309. The brightest member of Abell 2256 (UGC 10726) is an elliptical galaxy, has a diameter (kpc) of 87.99.

== See also ==
- List of Abell clusters
- Radio relics
