= Bean galaxy =

Massive elliptical radio galaxy in the constellation Draco

Bean Galaxy
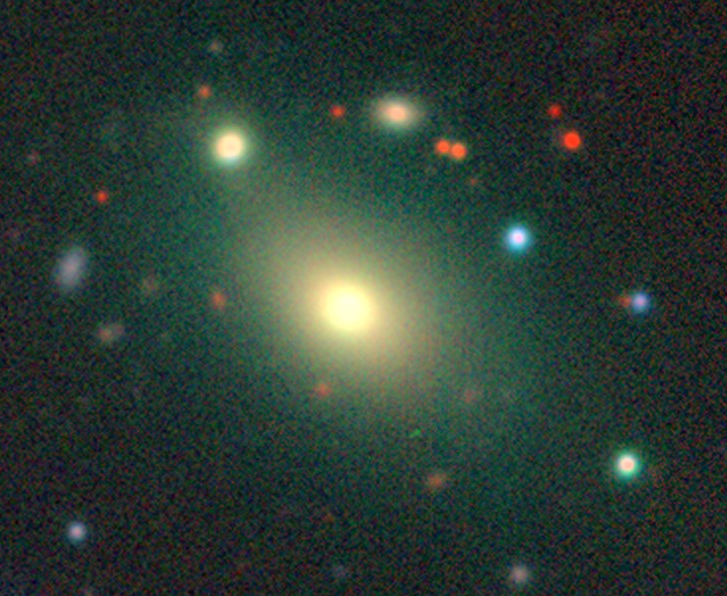
- DESI Legacy Surveys DR9 photo of the Bean Galaxy.

Observation data (J2000 epoch)
- Constellation: Draco
- Right ascension: 17^{h} 15^{m} 30.04^{s}
- Declination: +64° 39' 51.61"
- Redshift: 0.07898
- Heliocentric radial velocity: 22745
- Distance: 1.089 bly (334 mpc)
- Group or cluster: SDSS-C4 3089
- Magnitude (K): 11.568

Characteristics
- Type: cD
- Mass: 1.349×10^{12} M_{☉}
- Size: 319,000 ly (97,800 pc)

Other designations
- 7C 1715+6442, LEDA 59953, PGC 59953, WN B1715+6442

The Bean Galaxy, also known as 7C 1715+6442, is a supergiant elliptical galaxy, active galaxy, radio galaxy, and brightest cluster galaxy in the constellation of Draco. The galaxy is 1.09 billion light years (or 334,000,000 parsecs) away at a spectroscopic redshift of z = 0.07898. The galaxy has an apparent K magnitude of 11.568. The Bean Galaxy is the brightest cluster galaxy of SDSS-C4 3089, and this galaxy cluster contains a total of 17 galaxies. The galaxy was discovered in 1980 by the Westerbork Radio Telescope in the 14th list of radio sources.

== Characteristics ==
The Bean Galaxy is a massive, large supergiant elliptical galaxy in the galaxy cluster, SDSS-C4 3089. The galaxy has a total diameter of 319,000 light years (or 97,800 parsecs) across, or roughly three times larger than the Milky Way. The size was estimated using the 2MASS K-band total mag angular diameter of approximately one arcmin (or 60.4 arcsecs), and a redshift-independent distance of 1.09 billion light years (or 334,000,000 parsecs) away.

The Bean Galaxy is thought to be exceptionally massive, having a stellar mass of 1.35 trillion M_{☉} (or 10^{12.13}). The stellar population of the galaxy is predicted to be old, with an average age of 6.75 billion years old (or 10^{9.829}). The stellar population mainly consists of metal-poor red giant branch, and asymptotic giant branch stars. The galaxy has a star-formation rate of 0.235 M_{☉} per year, typical for gas-poor elliptical galaxies.

The galactic center of the Bean Galaxy has an active galactic nucleus (also referred to as an AGN), which is small region in the galactic center of a galaxy that is very luminous and energetic. The active galactic nucleus is powered by a large supermassive black hole (also known as an SMBH) with a mass of 2.207 billion M_{☉} estimated using velocity dispersion.

The Bean Galaxy is classified as a giant radio galaxy (also called as an GRG), i. e. a radio galaxy with radio lobes larger than 2.2 million light years (or 700,000 parsecs) across. It was first discovered in 1980 that the Bean Galaxy was a radio galaxy. The radio emissions stretch roughly 3 million light years (or 926,000 parsecs) across, based on an angular diameter of 10 arcmin. These radio lobes are created by the galaxy's massive central black hole. This giant radio galaxy is unusual because it is located in a galaxy cluster, which is rare for giant radio galaxies, and it is similar to other radio galaxies such as Inkathazo in both extent and location.

== X-ray source ==
One X-ray source has been discovered in the Bean Galaxy: CXOX J171530.1+643950, which is classified as a radio X-ray source, and was discovered in 2024 in a survey of 3.1 million X-ray sources.
