= Original TRG =

Radio galaxy in the constellation Draco

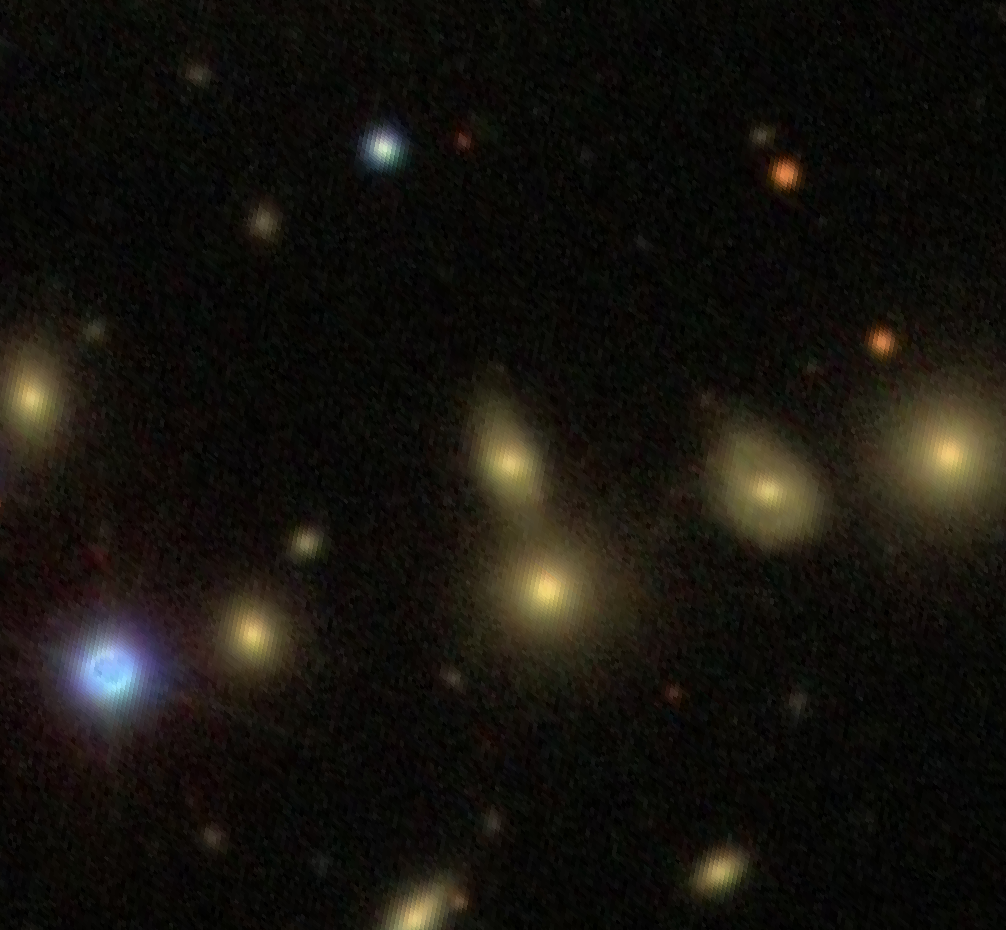
- SDSS image of the Original TRG

Observation data (J2000.0 epoch)
- Constellation: Draco
- Right ascension: 17^{h} 12^{m} 23.79^{s}
- Declination: +64° 02′ 11.21″
- Redshift: 0.079400
- Heliocentric radial velocity: 23,804 km/s
- Distance: 1.155 Gly (354.27 Mpc)
- Group or cluster: Abell 2255
- magnitude (J): 14.21

Characteristics
- Type: Radio galaxy
- Size: ~133,000 ly (40.7 kpc) (estimated)

Other designations
- 2MASX J17122373+6402114, 7C 1712+6406, LEDA 2663705, ABELL 2255:[ZBO89] R1, WISEA J171223.79+640211.2, TXS 1712+641, [GMF2006] J1712.4+6401

The Original TRG, simply known as the Original Tailed Radio Galaxy or 7C 1712+6406, is a radio galaxy located in the constellation of Draco. The redshift of the galaxy is (z) 0.079 and it was first discovered as an astronomical radio source by A. Slingo in 1974, whom he classified it having a straight radio spectrum. It is one of the members belonging to the Abell 2255 galaxy cluster.

== Description ==
The Original TRG is classified as a head-tail radio galaxy or alternatively a narrow-angle tail radio galaxy. When observed, the source is found to have a radio peak that is polarized by 1.4% at the position angle of 45°. It is also one of the galaxies to be situated within the region of halo radio emission with the orientation of the tail being pointed at a random angle. A sharp bend is observed in the source of the galaxy, heading northwards before subsequently merging into the halo.

Further radio imaging would find the Original TRG has a radio core that is found to be unresolved. The narrow angle tail structure of the source is described to be long and has an elongated appearance with it reaching up to 300 kiloparsecs. The total angular size of the source is estimated to be around 105 kiloparsecs but appears as more extended in previous radio observations made at 20 centimeters. Evidence also found the source contains strong levels of polarization based on imaging at 6 and 3.6 centimeters. The core region is also polarized at 4% when imaged at 3.6 centimeters, however it also increases along the tail feature.

A deeper study in 2025, would find there are presence of multiple structures connecting to the tail feature of the Original TRG. There is also a filament feature found as horizontal at the north-east end and a vertical filament that goes towards the north direction. Another filament feature is shown emerging outwards, between the position of the upper tail end and the horizontal filament western side. There is also a southern jet present, which is linked together by a patch of radio emission. The flux density is estimated to be 0.08 Jansky. Evidence also found the horizontal filament has an extension of 110 kiloparsecs from east to west, with the vertical filament being around 83 kiloparsecs long.
