= Radio relics =

Astronomical object

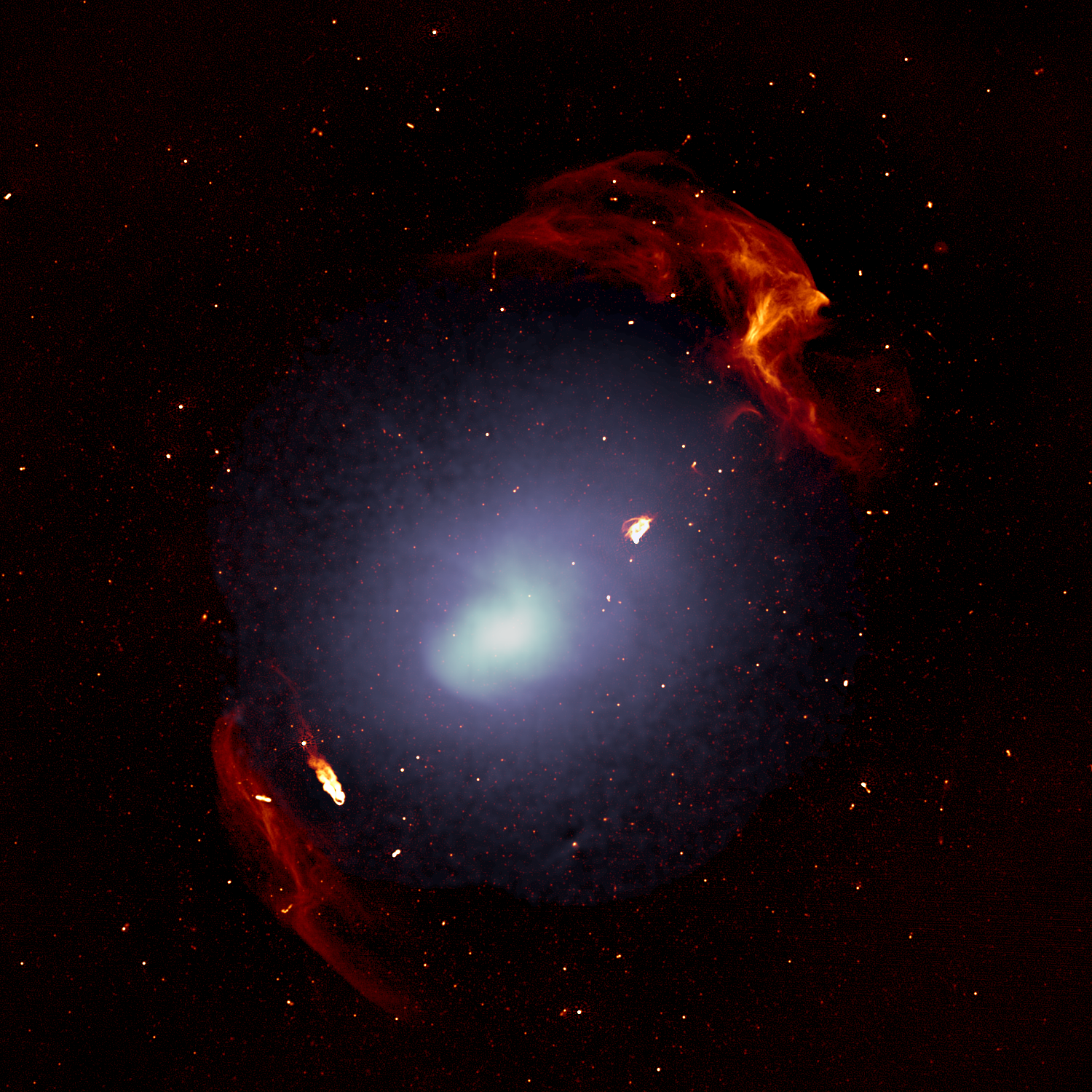
The radio relics present in Abell 3667

Radio relics are diffuse synchrotron radio sources found in the peripheral regions of galaxy clusters. As in the case of radio halos, they do not have any obvious galaxy counterpart, but their shapes are much more elongated and irregular compared to those of radio halos. Their energy distribution is steep (much more energy at low radio frequency than at high radio frequency), with hints of a distribution of different ages for the emitting electrons across the whole dimension of the emitting region.

Radio relics can be divided into two main groups: cluster radio shocks or radio gischt are large elongated, often Mpc-sized, radio sources located in the periphery of merging clusters. They probably trace shock fronts in which particles are accelerated via the diffusive shock acceleration mechanism. Among them are double-relics with the two relics located on both sides of a cluster centre. Their integrated radio spectrum usually follows a single power law. Radio phoenices are related to radio-loud active galactic nuclei (AGN). Fossil radio plasma from a previous episode of AGN activity is thought to be compressed by a merger shock wave which boosts both the magnetic field inside the plasma as well as the momenta of the relativistic particles. As a result, the radio plasma brightens in synchrotron emission. In contrast to the radio gischt, the phoenices have a steep curved spectrum indicating an old population of electrons.

The sizes of relics and the distances to the cluster centre vary significantly. Examples of radio relics with sizes of 1 Mpc or larger have been observed in Coma (the prototypical relic source 1253 + 275), Abell 2255, and Abell 2256, which contain both a relic and a halo (as do Abell 225, Abell 521, Abell 754, Abell 1300, Abell 2255, and Abell 2744). The cluster Abell 3667 contains two very luminous, almost symmetric relics with a separation of more than 5 Mpc, as does ZwCl 2341.1+0000, Abell 2345, Abell 1240, and ZwCl 0008.8+5215. The relic with the best evidence for shock acceleration found to date is located in the northern outskirts of the merging galaxy cluster CIZA J2242.8+5301. This relic has been nicknamed the sausage and has been discovered by Reinout van Weeren and Marcus Brüggen using the Giant Metrewave Radio Telescope (GMRT) in India.
