= Radio halo =

Large-scale sources of diffuse radio emission in galaxy clusters

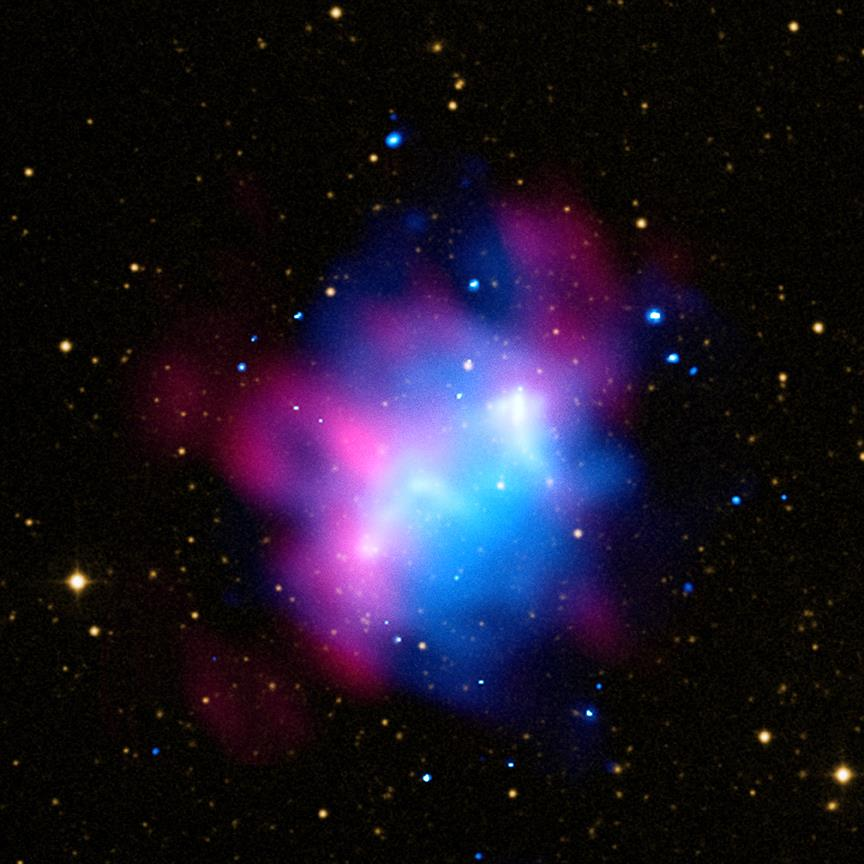
Halo of the Abell 1758 cluster shown in pink from the GMRT, overlaid with Chandra data shown in blue.

Radio halos are large-scale sources of diffuse radio emission found in the center of some, but not all, galaxy clusters. There are two classes of radio halos: mini-halos and giant radio halos. The linear size of giant radio halos is about 700 kiloparsecs (2.3 million light-years), whereas mini-halos are typically less than 500 kpc. Giant radio halos are more often observed in highly X-ray luminous cluster samples than less luminous X-ray clusters ($\mathrm{L}_X \leq 10^{45} \mathrm{erg\ s}^{-1}$) in complete samples. They have a very low surface brightness and do not have obvious galaxy counterparts (in contrast to radio galaxies which have AGN counterparts). However, their morphologies typically follow the distribution of gas in the intra-cluster medium. Mini-halos however, while similar to giant halos, are found at the center of cooling core clusters but around a radio galaxy.

The cause of radio haloes is still debated, but they may be caused by reacceleration of mildly relativistic electrons during a merger event between galaxy clusters. The generated turbulent motions of the intra-cluster plasma drive Magneto-Hydrodynamical Waves, which couples with mildly relativistic particles (i.e. of energy on the level of 100 MeV) and accelerate them up to energy of 10 GeV or more. An alternative model suggests they are caused by secondary electrons generated by collisions between cosmic ray protons (CRp) and intra-cluster medium (ICM) protons.

Radio relics resemble haloes but are found at the edge of clusters. They are likely to result from synchrotron radiation originating from electrons accelerated by shock waves, moving in the intracluster magnetic field of around 0.1 - 3 μG.
