= Polarization (cosmology) =

E and B modes (Polarisation)

Polarization in cosmology refers to the orientation of the oscillations of waves as they travel through space, primarily understood in the cosmic microwave background (CMB) radiation presently. Polarization provides critical information about the early universe, especially about its structure, dynamics, and evolution.

== Cosmic Background Radiation Polarization ==
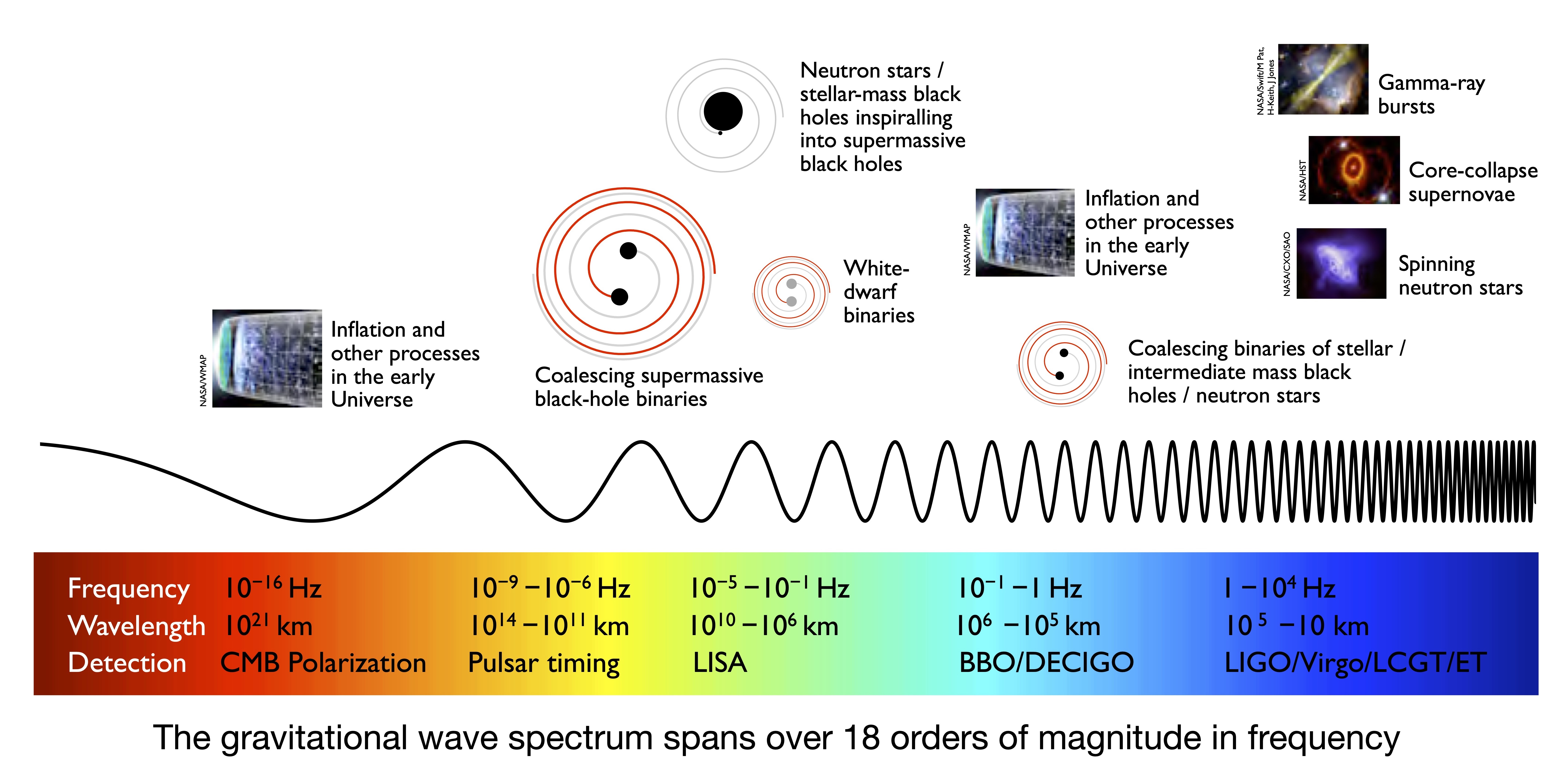
sub-Hz Radiation Spectrum and corresponding detection approaches

With a standard optical telescope, the background space between stars and galaxies is almost completely dark. However, a sufficiently sensitive radio telescope detects a faint background glow that is almost uniform and is not associated with any star, galaxy, or other object. This glow is strongest in the microwave region of the radio spectrum.

E and B modes are two types of polarization patterns of radiation observed in sky.

The launch of the IXPE telescope in late 2021 made polarization measurements in the 2–8 KeV band also a reality (more than 40 years after the pioneering observations of the OSO-8 satellite) and its polarimetric observations confirmed theoretical predictions, according to which X-ray radiation from magnetar sources is also highly polarized, up to ≈ 80%, the highest value detected so far. Photons propagating in a strongly magnetized environment are expected to be linearly polarized in two normal modes called the ordinary (O) and the extraordinary (X) one, parallel or perpendicular to the plane of the local magnetic field and the photon propagation direction, respectively. In the 2–10 keV band (which is the one accessible to current instrumentation), radiation emitted from the bare, condensed surface of magnestars is expected to be only mildly polarized (≲30%), with either O- or X-mode dominating, depending on both the photon energy and propagation direction with respect to the star magnetic field. Magnetar emission can be reasonably expected to be mostly polarized in the X-mode.

Cosmic infrared background (CIB) has also been observed to be polarised. This CIB emission from dust surrounding star-forming regions in distant galaxies shows both the CIB E and B modes.

Gamma-ray Bursts are also being studied using gamma-ray (GRB) polarimeters and polarization-sensitive Compton telescopes. A future GRB polarimeter, POLAR-2, is under development for launch in 2024, and COSI has been selected by NASA for launch in 2025. Meanwhile, studies of data from POLAR combined with data from Fermi Gamma-ray Burst Monitor (Fermi-GBM) and Neil Gehrels Swift Observatory has pointed to lower gamma-ray burst polarization. But the authors have also stated that those could be possible artifacts of averaging of the changing polarization signal over time which maybe washing out an actual moderate gamma-ray burst polarization. Hence, the authors have cautioned against over-interpretation of current results and wait for more detailed polarization measurements from future missions such as POLAR-2 and LEAP.

Till date (as of 2021), all GRB polarization measurements performed have made use of Compton scattering in the detector.

B-mode polarization can also be used as an indirect probe into the cosmic neutrino background because unlike E-mode polarization, it is possible to generate the B-mode by Compton scattering in case of tensor mode of metric perturbation but not in the case of scalar mode of metric perturbation.

In plasma physics, in an unmagnetized plasma, the Electromagnetic electron wave is simply a light wave modified by the plasma. In a magnetized plasma, the two modes perpendicular to the field are the O and X modes, and two modes parallel to the field are the R and L waves. The O wave is the "ordinary" wave in the sense that its dispersion relation is the same as that in an unmagnetized plasma. It is plane polarized with E_{1} || B_{0}. It has a cut-off at the plasma frequency. The X wave is the "extraordinary" wave because it has a more complicated dispersion relation: It is partly transverse (with E_{1}⊥B_{0}) and partly longitudinal.

== Properties ==
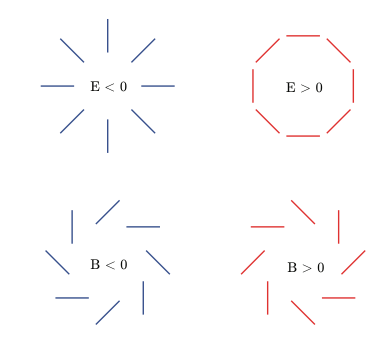
Examples of E-mode and B-mode patterns of polarization. Note that if reflected across a line going through the center the E-patterns are unchanged, while the positive and negative B-patterns get interchanged

There are two directions in a polarization pattern - its orientation and its amplitude.

If the radiation polarization orientation is parallel or perpendicular to its amplitude direction, it is called an E-mode polarization. If it is crossed at 45-degree angles, it is called a B-mode polarization.

Plane waves fluctuations (like density or scalar perturbations in the early universe) produce polarization patterns of a particular type, known as E mode. This polarization pattern is highly symmetrical with the observed orientation being independent of observation location while the observed magnitude is independent of longitude (for a fixed latitude of observation).

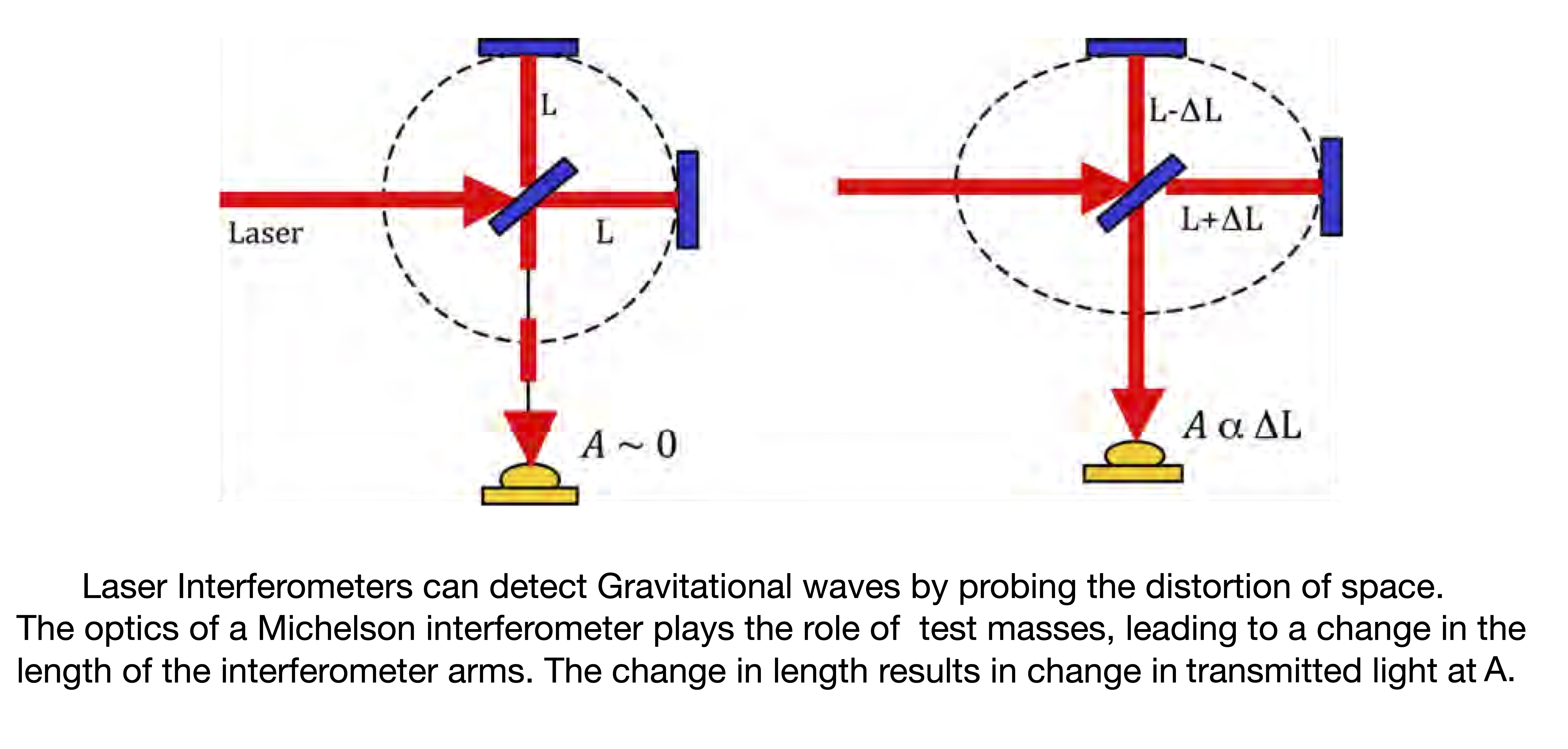
Principle for gravitational waves detection using Laser Interferometer

Gravitational wave can cause an anisotropic stretching of space, and this asymmetry causes a "handedness" to the pattern of polarization. Changing the viewing location, changes the observed orientation and magnitude of polarization (the pattern across all latitudes and longitudes becomes asymmetric). This polarization pattern is known as B mode.

Plane wave (density perturbations) just generate parallel polarization and so generate only E-mode polarization. Gravitational waves generate both and so have a component of B-mode polarization also.

B-modes retain their special nature that they can possess a handedness that distinguishes left from right. If reflected across a line going through the center the E-patterns are unchanged, while the positive and negative B-patterns get interchanged.

For Gravitational waves (GW) detection using the LIGO-Virgo standard, there are only two tensor modes of polarisation called plus and cross in General Theory of Relativity (GR). It means that a passing GW would stretch and squeeze a ring of particles to the form of + and x, although alternative theories of gravity can have up to six modes of polarisation (two tensor, two vector, and two scalar modes - which are plus (+), cross (×), breathing (b), longitudinal (l), vector-x (x) and vector-y (y) modes, considering z-direction as the propagation direction of GWs).

== Measurement ==
Planck, BICEP, etc. detect electromagnetic radiation and "E-modes" and "B-modes" refer to polarization characteristics of this radiation, not the actual electric and magnetic fields. The names derive from an analogy to the decomposition of a vector field into curl-less (here "E" for electric or "G" for gradient) and divergence-less ("B" for magnetic or "C" for curl) components.

For measurements, the first step is the measurement of standard Stokes parameters Q and U. In general, the polarization of monochromatic light is completely described via four Stokes parameters, which form a (non-orthonormal) vector space when the various waves are incoherent. For light propagating in the z direction, with electric field:

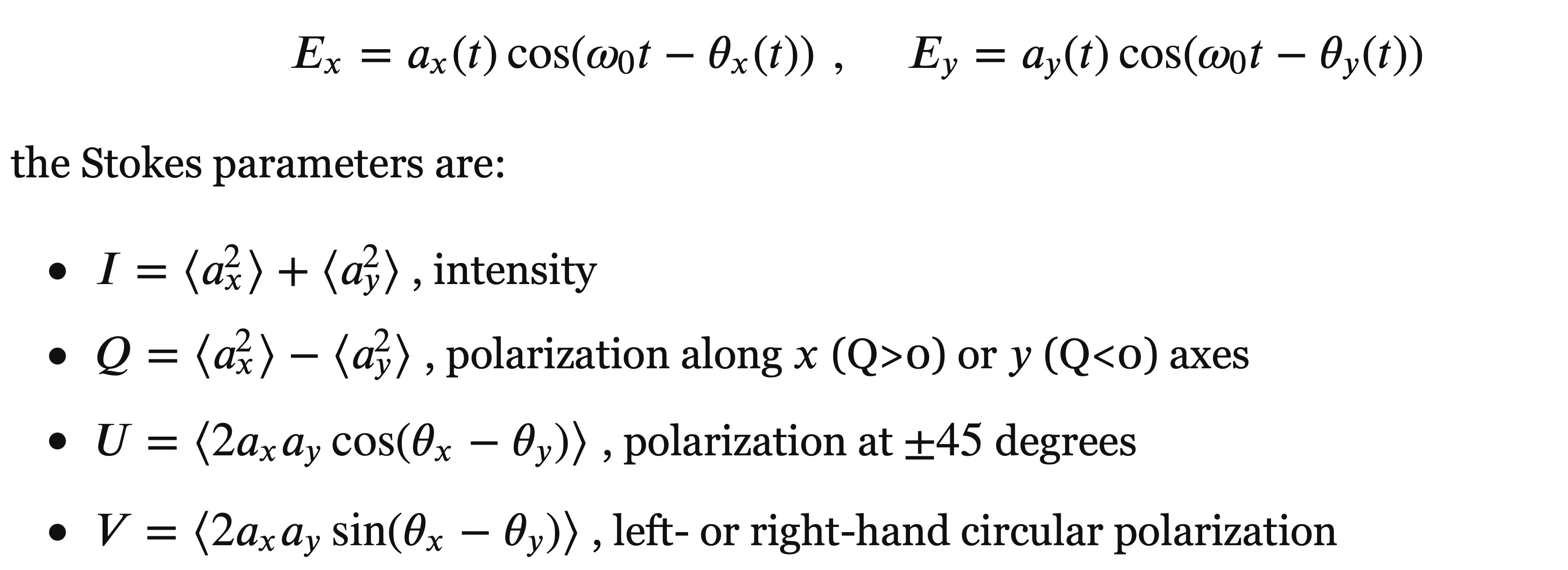

In cosmology, no circular polarization is expected, so V is not considered. In addition, normalization of Q and U is traditionally with respect to the mean temperature T0 instead of intensity I.

The definitions of Q and U imply that they transform under a rotation 𝝰 around the z-axis according to:

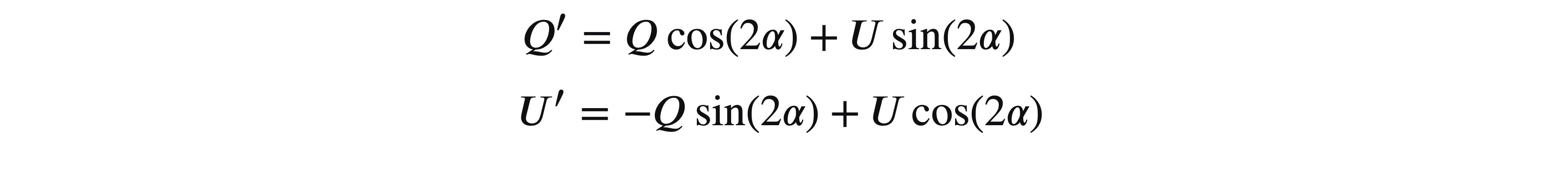

These parameters transform, not like a vector, but like a two-dimensional, second rank symmetric trace-free (STF) polarization tensor P. In spherical polar coordinates (θ, ɸ), the metric tensor g and polarization tensor are:

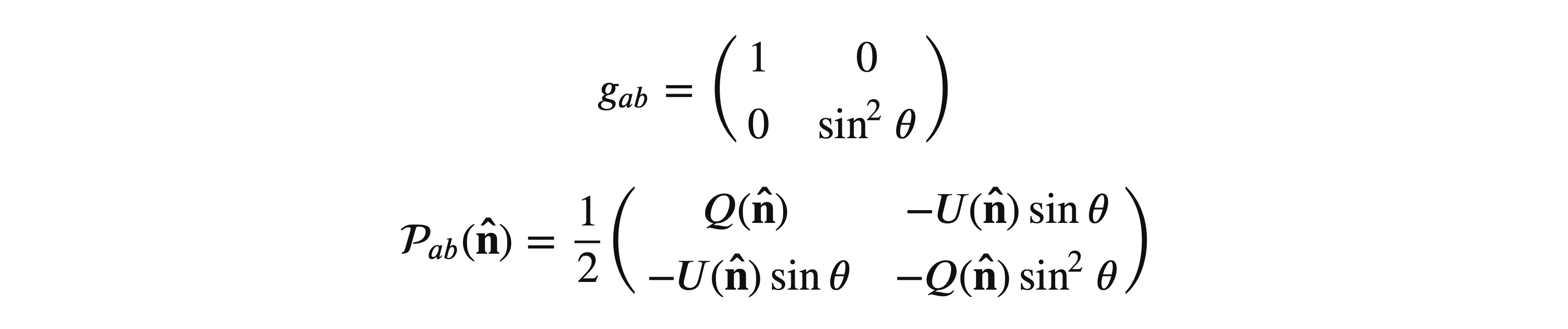

This matrix is symmetric and trace-free.

Just as a scalar function can be expanded in terms of spherical harmonics Y, the polarization tensor (with its two independent parameters Q and U) can be expanded in terms of two sets of orthonormal tensor harmonics:

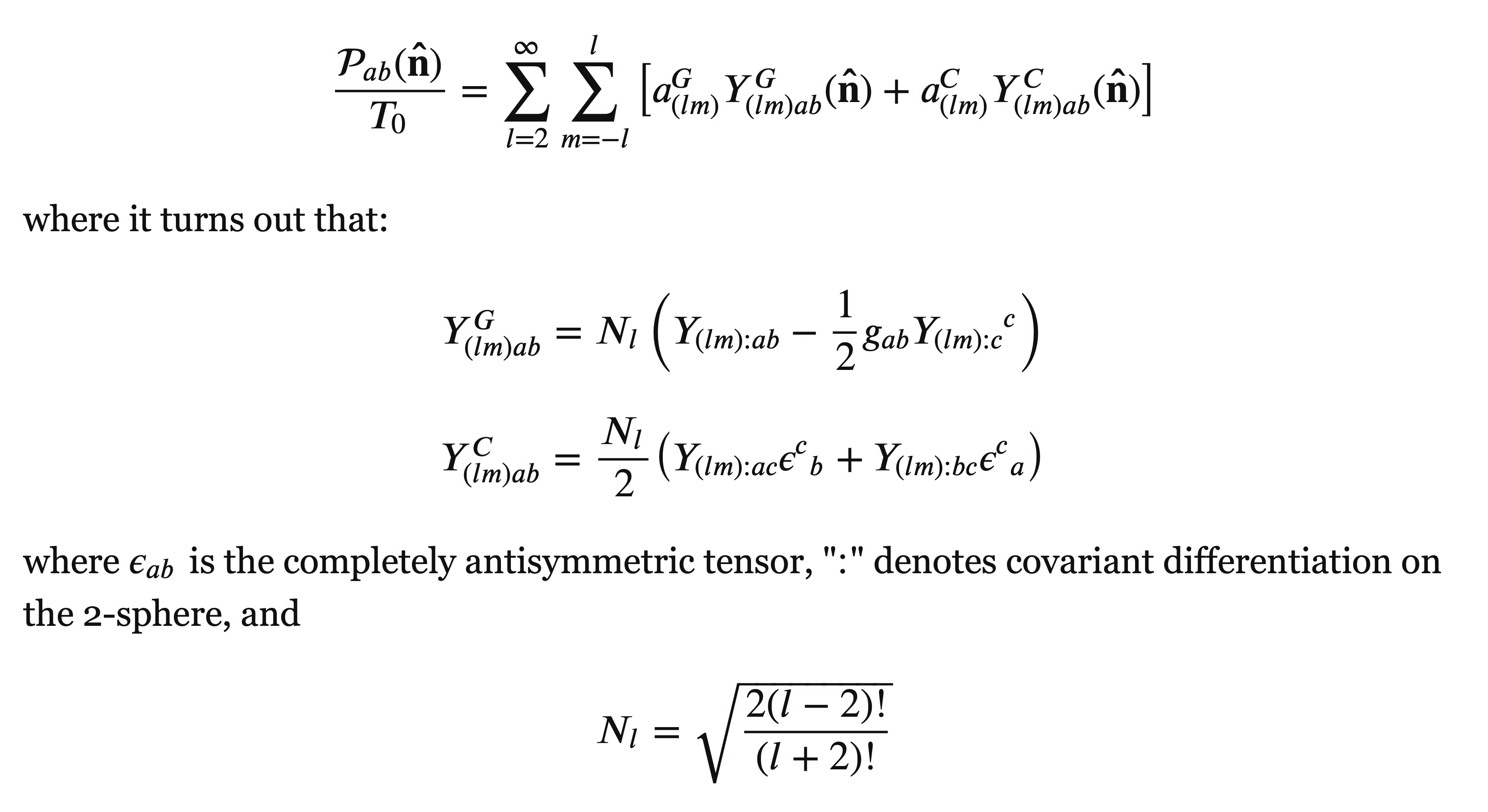

The "G" ("E") basis tensors are "like" gradients, and the "C" ("B") like curls.

It appears that cosmological perturbations are either scalar (e.g. energy density perturbations) or tensor (gravitational waves). Crucially, scalar perturbations produce only E-mode (G-type) polarization, so evidence of a cosmological B-mode is evidence of gravitational waves. However, the Milky-Way "dust" polarization (the "foreground" to cosmologists) can produce B-modes, so it must be well-understood and subtracted to obtain the cosmological signal.

== Importance ==
Decoupling freezes the distribution of relativistic particles at the time of decoupling in the radiation dominated phase of early universe when non-relativistic particles are negligible contributors. The number density of the decoupled particles will be comparable to the number density of photons at any given time. In particular, any such decoupled species will continue to exist in our universe today as a relic background with number densities comparable to the number density of photons (but with energy densities proportionate to respective mass).

In fact, the neutrons and protons contained in the present day universe must have existed at temperatures ~ 10^12 K as well since these particles could not have been produced at lesser temperature. The ratio between the number density of baryons and the number density of photons remains approximately constant from temperatures ~ 10^12 K till today.

At the time of decoupling, the photons, neutrinos and the rest of the matter had the same temperature. The interaction rate of neutrinos becomes lower than the expansion rate of the universe when the temperature drops below ~ 1MeV. At lower temperatures, the neutrinos are completely decoupled from the rest of the matter. Since the neutrinos are taken to be almost massless, they are relativistic at the time of decoupling and the present day universe should contain a relic background of these neutrinos.

At the time of decoupling, the distribution function of all species (other than the decoupled particle) will be still with a common temperature. Hence, when the neutrinos have decoupled with their entropy is separately conserved, the photons are in equilibrium with electrons and positrons. When the temperature of the universe becomes lower than the electron rest mass (~0.5MeV which corresponds to a temperature of approx 6 x 10^9 K), then the mean energy of the photons will fall below the energy required to create electron-positron pairs. Thus the backward reaction of photons creating electron-positron pairs will be severely suppressed. The forward reaction of electron-positron pairs annihilation to create photons will continue to occur resulting in the disappearance of the electron-positron pairs.

When the electron-positron pairs annihilation is complete, the only relativistic specie left is the photon.

Observation of these primordial photons is meant to reveal the two polarization patterns E and B modes which help to understand the physics of the early universe and its late-time evolution. Unfortunately, galactic nuclei and dust emit very strongly in the wavelength < 3 x 10^-2 cm, completely swamping the primordial signal.

== Understanding decoupling of matter and radiation ==
In the early universe, several processes keep the radiation and matter tightly coupled until a temperature of about a few eV due to sufficient number of free charged particles.

At temperatures below 0.1MeV (the temperature at which the actual synthesis of the first four light nuclei takes place - even though the binding energies of these nuclei suggest that these could be formed when the temperature of the universe is in the range of 1-30MeV - but then is delayed due to reasons of high entropy of the universe, i.e. the high value for the photon-to-baryon ratio), at this temperature the main constituents of the universe will be the hydrogen nucleus (i.e. proton), helium-4 nucleus, electrons, photons and decoupled neutrinos. Since electron rest mass ~ 0.5Mev, the ions and electrons may be considered non-relativistic. These constituents interact amongst themselves and with the photons through various electromagnetic processes, like Bremsstrahlung, Compton (and Thomson) scattering, recombination reaction ($p + e^{-} \longleftrightarrow H + \gamma$) and Coulomb scattering between charged particles.

When the recombination reaction rate falls below the expansion rate of the universe, the formation of neutral atoms ceases. The remaining electrons and protons have negligible probability for combining with each other. Thus, a small fraction (~10 ^-5) of electrons and protons will remain free in the universe.

The formation of atoms affects the photons, which were in thermal equilibrium with the rest of the matter through various scattering processes. The timescales for Compton scattering and free-free absorption become much larger than the expansion timescale when the fraction of charged particles which have not combined to form atoms drops to its residual value. The only scattering which is still somewhat operational is the Thomson scattering, which merely changes the direction of the photon without any energy exchange. When the number density of charged particles decreases, even this interaction rate of the photons drops and eventually becomes lower than the expansion rate of the universe. Thereafter the photons are decoupled from the rest of the matter.

For radiation temperature T <= 0.2eV, the neutral matter and photons evolve as uncoupled systems. The parameter T characterising the Planck spectrum continues to fall because of the redshift of the photons. The neutral matter behaves as a gaseous mixture of hydrogen and helium. The photon mean-free-path becomes larger than expansion rate, thus decoupling radiation from matter.

After decoupling, the temperature of the neutral atoms falls faster than that of radiation. As the fraction of charged particles which have not combined to form atoms drops, the relaxation time for matter increases and the energy transfer from the radiation to the matter becomes less and less effective. The adiabatic cooling makes the matter temperature fall faster than the radiation temperature. A small fraction of ionized matter continues to be affected by the photons. The electron mean-free-path which governs this process is much smaller than the photon mean-free-path. Thus, the free electrons are tied to the radiation till a redshift of 20 or so. In other words, the small number of electrons have many collisions with a small number of photons, though most of the photons are unaffected. This interaction has very little effect on the photons because of the small number of charged particles present.
