= MAssive Cluster Survey =

Galaxy cluster survey

- Alternative names: MACS
- Website: www.ifa.hawaii.edu/~ebeling/clusters/MACS.html
- Related media on Commons

The MAssive Cluster Survey (MACS) compiled and characterized a sample of very X-ray luminous (and thus, by inference, massive), distant clusters of galaxies. The sample comprises 124 spectroscopically confirmed clusters at 0.3 < z < 0.7. Candidates were selected from the ROSAT All-Sky Survey data.

Cluster candidates that are south of declination -40° cannot be observed from Mauna Kea and fit into the Southern MACS (SMACS) extension. They are also being investigated when facilities are available.

== History ==
One of the galaxy clusters, MACS J0647+7015 was found to have gravitationally lensed the most distant galaxy (MACS0647-JD) then ever imaged, in 2012, by CLASH. The first statistical study of X-ray cavities in distant clusters of galaxies was performed by analyzing the Chandra X-ray observations of MACS. Out of 76 clusters representing a sample of the most luminous X-ray clusters, observers found 13 cut and clear cavities and 7 possible cavities. A new radio halo, as well as a relic applicant, were found in MACS, with the help of the Giant Meterwave Radio Telescope and the Karoo Array Telescope-7. The discovered radio halo has a largest linear scale of about 0.9Mpc. X-ray chosen clusters are almost free of projection effects because they are composed of intrinsically massive, gravitationally collapsed systems.

== MACS team ==
The MACS team consists of:

- Harald Ebeling, University of Hawaii, USA
- Alastair Edge, University of Durham, UK
- J. Patrick Henry, University of Hawaii, USA

== Survey notation ==
Objects are labelled as JHHMM.m+DDMM where HHMM+DDMM are the coordinates in the J2000 system. Here H, D, and M refer to hours, degrees, and minutes, respectively, and m refers to tenths of minutes of time.

- HH Hours of right ascension
- MM.m Minutes of right ascension or declination
- DD.d Degrees in declination

== Southern MAssive Cluster Survey ==
The Southern MAssive Cluster Survey (SMACS) involved the Hubble Space Telescope.

== Notable surveyed objects ==
Survey object	Right ascension	Declination	Notes
MACS J0025.4-1222	00^{h} 25.4^{m}	−12° 22′	
MACS J0358.8-2955	03^{h} 58.8^{m}	−29.5°	Part of Abell 3192
MACS J0416.1-2403	04^{h} 16^{m} 9.9^{s}	−24° 03′ 58″	
MACS J0647+7015	06^{h} 47^{m}	+70° 15′	
MACS J0717.5+3745	07^{h} 17.5^{m}	+37° 45′	
SMACS J0723.3–7327	07^{h} 23^{m}	−73° 27′	Subject of first JWST deep field
MACS J1149 Lensed Star 1	11^{h} 49^{m} 35.59^{s}	22° 23′ 47.4″	Blue supergiant star observed through a gravitational lens
MACS 1423-z7p64	14^{h} 23^{m}	24° 04′	Most distant galaxy known as of April 2017
MACS 2129-1	21^{h} 29^{m}	−1°	
