= UDFy-38135539 =

Distant galaxy in the constellation Fornax

- Hubble Space Telescope image of UDFy-38135539

Observation data (J2000 epoch)
- Constellation: Fornax
- Right ascension: 03^{h} 32^{m} 38.13^{s}
- Declination: −27° 45′ 53.9″
- Redshift: 8.6
- Heliocentric radial velocity: 2,581,213 km/s
- Distance: 13.1 billion light-years (4.0 billion parsecs) (light travel distance); ~30 billion light-years (9.0 billion parsecs) (present proper distance)
- Apparent magnitude (V): V fainter than 30.2; H_{160} = 28.1 (detected by HST in J and H bands)

Characteristics
- Type: Dwarf
- Number of stars: 1 billion
- Size: 10,000 ly (diameter)
- Apparent size (V): 0.0025 x 0.0012

Other designations
- HUDF.YD3, TST2010 3, MDC2010 1721

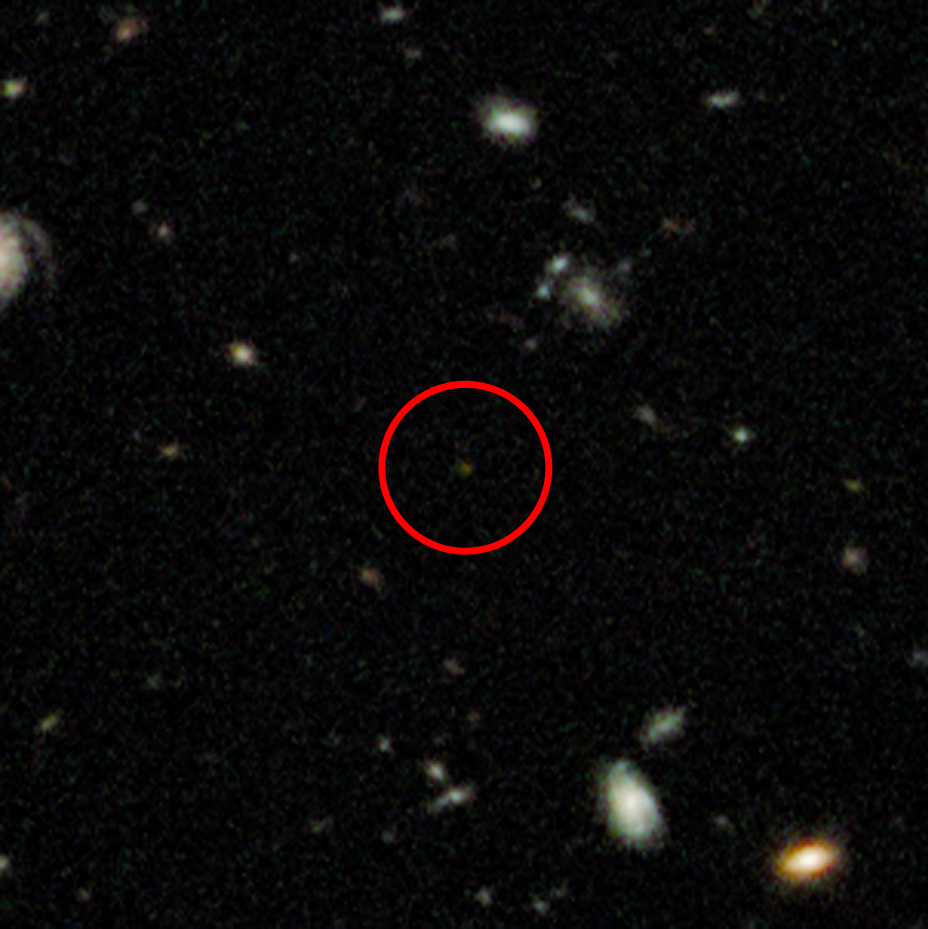
UDFy-38135539 is within the annotated red circle

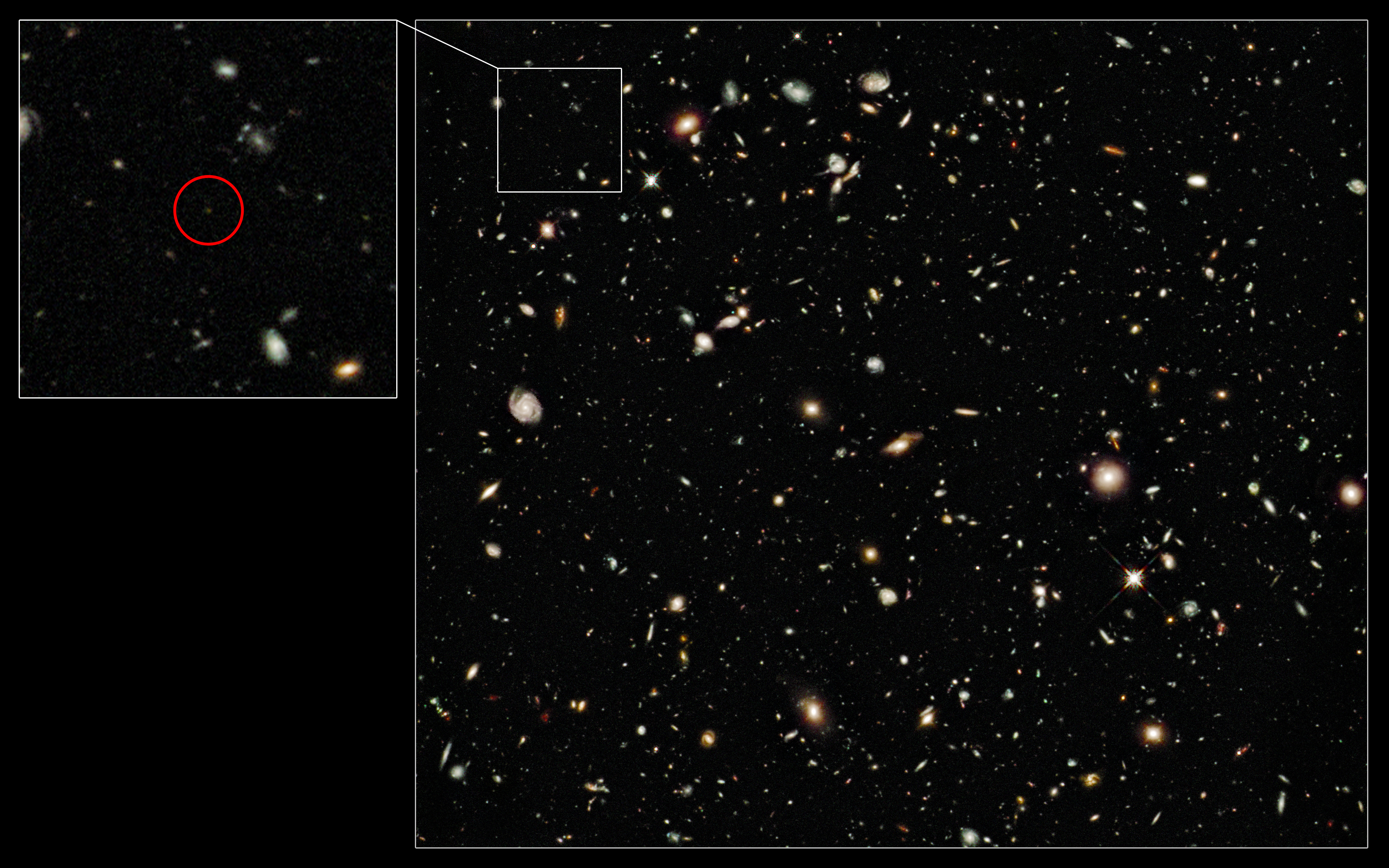
Location of UDFy-38135539 (HUDF.YD3)

UDFy-38135539 (also known as "HUDF.YD3") is the Hubble Ultra Deep Field (UDF) identifier for a galaxy which was calculated as of October 2010 to have a light travel time of 13.1 billion years with a present proper distance of around 30 billion light-years.

It was discovered by three teams in September 2009 in sensitive infrared Hubble Space Telescope images and identified by these as source UDF-38135539 (R Bouwens et al.), source HUDF.YD3 (A Bunker et al.) and source 1721 (R McLure et al.), and additionally reported in the Astrophysical Journal, and the Monthly Notices of the Royal Astronomical Society. All teams independently identified the source to likely be an extremely distant galaxy because there was no measurable light at visible wavelengths (caused by absorption of hydrogen gas along the line of sight). Following the discovery of this candidate distant galaxy, another team targeted this object with ground-based spectroscopy to confirm the distance, reporting a redshift z=8.6. However, attempts to replicate this observation strongly suggest the original claim was in error, meaning that at the present time the galaxy only has a photometric redshift estimate.

== Detection ==
Its first known imaging was in Hubble Space Telescope's Hubble Ultra Deep Field, the most detailed deep space picture at that time. The galaxy was observed in August and September 2009. The image data was released to the scientific community, which led to the galaxy's detection by the teams of Bouwens, Bunker and McLure, and subsequent spectroscopic campaign by the team of Lehnert and colleagues.

Just on Hubble data, the galaxy could be an object intrinsically red and relatively close to Earth, therefore, confirmation using suitably sensitive spectroscopic equipment was needed. This was attempted using the European Southern Observatory's SINFONI-equipped Very Large Telescope unit Yepun, located atop Cerro Paranal in Chile's Atacama Desert. Lehnert's team observed the galaxy for 16 hours, and then analysed their results over 2 months, and published their findings in Nature, in October 2010. Since then, more sensitive measurements have failed to replicate the result, suggesting the spectroscopic claim was in error.

== Characteristics ==
The galaxy is located in the constellation Fornax, and is estimated to have contained roughly a billion stars, although it was only at most one tenth of the diameter of our own galaxy, the Milky Way, and had less than 1% of the mass of the Milky Way's stars. According to Lehnert (of the Observatoire de Paris), it was forming the same number of stars per year as our galaxy, but they were much smaller and less massive, making it "intensely star forming".

The light travel distance of the light that we observe from UDFy-38135539 (HUF.YD3) is more than 4 billion parsecs (13.1 billion light years), and it has a luminosity distance of 86.9 billion parsecs (about 283 billion light years). There are a number of different distance measures in cosmology, and both "light travel distance" and "luminosity distance" are different from the comoving distance or "proper distance" generally used in defining the size of the observable universe (comoving distance and proper distance are defined to be equal at the present cosmological time, so they can be used interchangeably when talking about the distance to an object at present, but proper distance increases with time due to the expansion of the universe, and is the distance used in Hubble's law; see Uses of the proper distance for more on the physical meaning of this notion of 'distance'). The luminosity distance D_{L} is related to a factor called the "comoving transverse distance" D_{M} by the equation D_{L} = (1 + z) D_{M}, where z is the redshift, and the comoving transverse distance is itself equal to the radial comoving distance (i.e., comoving distance between an object and ourselves) in a spatially flat universe. So with D_{L} = 86.9 billion parsecs and z = 8.55, the comoving distance would be about 9.1 billion parsecs (about 30 billion light years).

The infrared light that we now observe from the galaxy was emitted as ultraviolet radiation toward the end of an era when the universe was filled with atomic hydrogen, which absorbed at ultraviolet wavelengths. Because the galaxy's own light alone would not have been intense enough to ionize a large region and render it transparent, scientists suspect that a population of smaller, undetected galaxies, contributed to the reionization making UDFy-38135539 visible.

== Significance ==
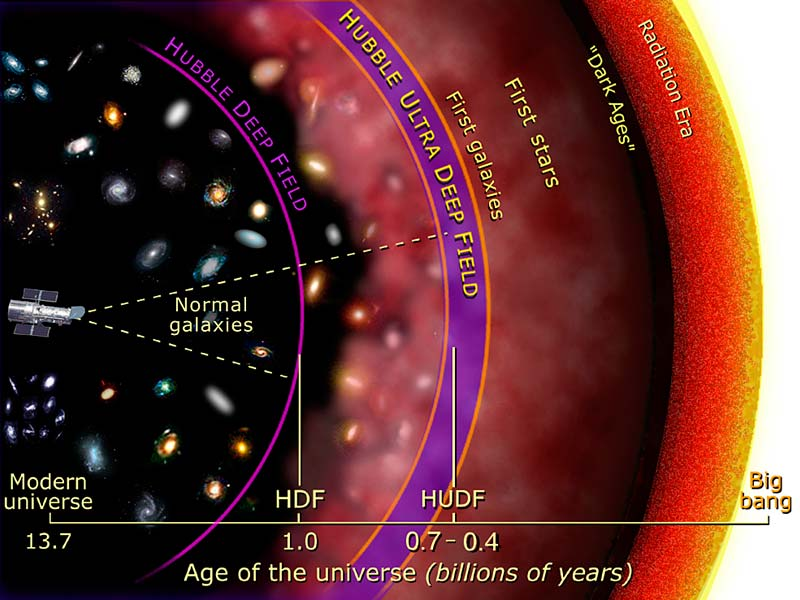
Hubble looking into the past.

The period of universal star birth was the reionization epoch. The universe's first stars were massive, ionizing hydrogen in the surrounding environment (Trenti).

UDFy-38135539 (HUDF.YD3) is thought to be one of the first galaxies observed in the reionization epoch. Caltech astronomer Brant Robertson, commenting on the study, stated that the "galaxy happens to reside at a very special time in cosmic history when the properties of gas in the universe were changing rapidly, and therefore this galaxy and others like it may teach us a lot about the early history of the universe". Michele Trenti, an astronomer who was not involved in the study but provided commentary published with the report, says that the discovery of the distant galaxy represents a "fundamental leap forward in observational cosmology."

== Subsequent discoveries ==
Scientists hope to find older galaxies; however, closer to the Big Bang, fewer exist and they are dimmer on average. They will therefore be increasingly difficult to find, since they would be very faint with fewer observable stars. Trenti says that new "most distant" record holders will soon be announced, but only incremental distance gains will be realized until NASA's James Webb Space Telescope becomes operational, which occurred in 2022.

The James Webb Space Telescope has detected galaxies more than 13.4 billion light years away, less than 300 million years after the Big Bang. Bremer states that it, and eventually the European Extremely Large Telescope, which will have a mirror five times the diameter of Yepun's, and is tentatively scheduled for first light in 2024, will enable more detailed study of galaxies at such great distances. Lehnert states that this discovery is not "the limit, perhaps not even that close to it".

At that time, Trenti said redshift 8.6 would likely to be as high as we can reach with the current generation of Earth-bound telescopes, but that with the JWST, "it might be possible to find some galaxies up to redshift 10". Candidates with higher redshifts than UDFy-38135539's have been reported subsequently, but not yet confirmed with light spectrum instruments, for example UDFj-39546284 and MACS0647-JD.

== See also ==
- GRB 090423 is a gamma ray burst, which previously held the record for most distant object, and remains the most distant object with a spectroscopic redshift.
- The methods used to determine the distances to very distant cosmic objects are described in the "Cosmic distance ladder".

Preceded by IOK-1	Most distant galaxy known 2009-2011	Succeeded by UDFj-39546284
