= Cluster Lensing and Supernova survey with Hubble =

Program on the Hubble Space Telescope

Cluster Lensing And Supernova survey with Hubble
- Alternative names: CLASH
- Related media on Commons

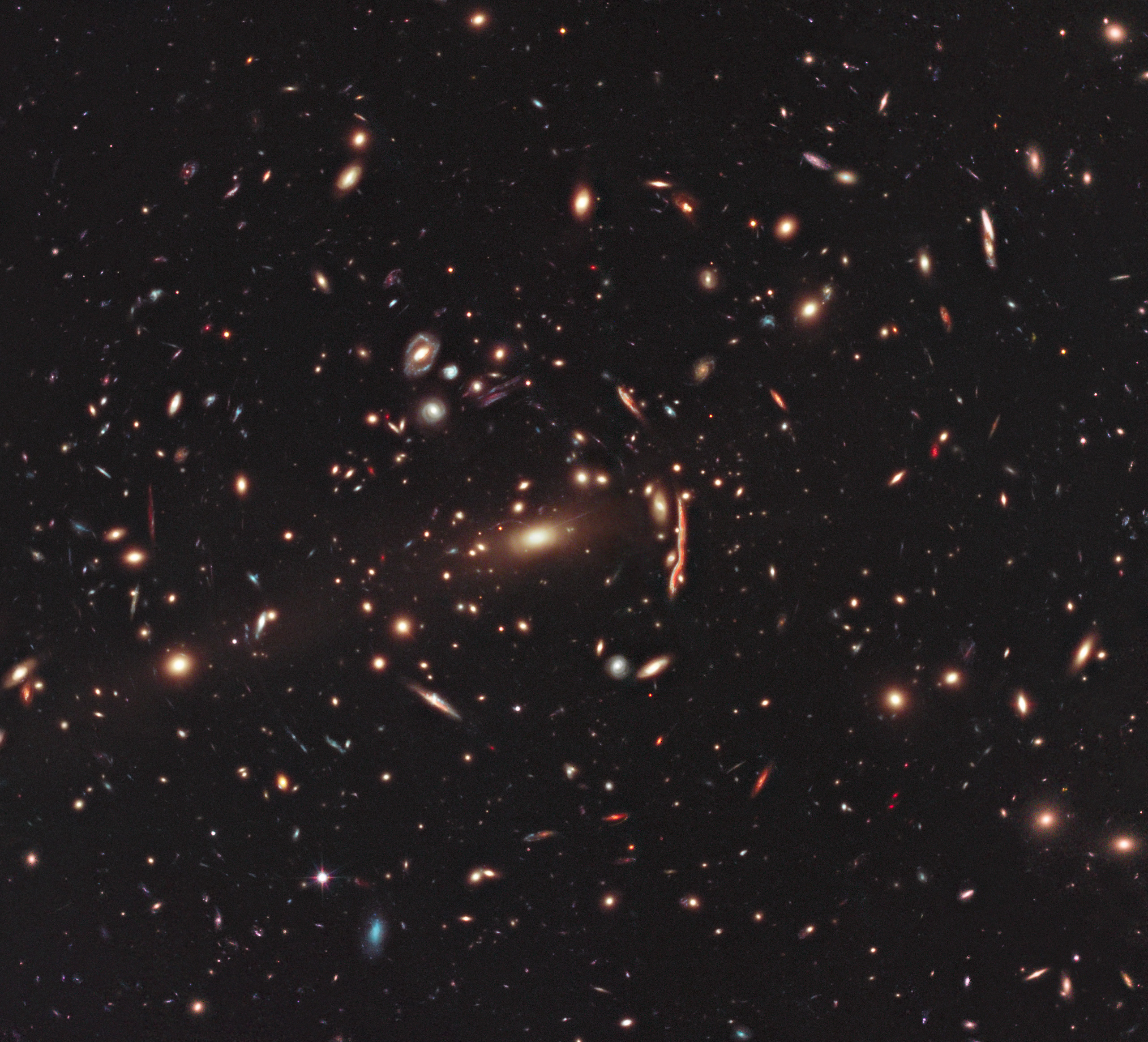
This image from the NASA/ESA Hubble Space Telescope shows the galaxy cluster MACS J1206. This is one of 25 clusters being studied as part of the CLASH (Cluster Lensing and Supernova survey with Hubble) programme, a major project to build a library of scientific data on lensing clusters.

The Cluster Lensing And Supernova survey with Hubble (CLASH) was a program on the Hubble Space Telescope to observe 25 massive galaxy clusters. CLASH was one of three programs selected (along with CANDELS and PHAT) in the first class of Hubble multi-cycle treasury programs, which were designed to tackle large questions unanswerable through normal observations. Observations for CLASH were conducted between November 2010 and July 2013. CLASH was led by principal investigator Marc Postman, and had a science team of over 40 researchers.

Primary observations for CLASH were conducted on the Hubble Space Telescope with the Advanced Camera for Surveys (ACS) and Wide Field Camera 3 (WFC3). Images were taken in 16 filters, which were selected to maximize the ability to detect distant galaxies behind each cluster. Twenty of the observed clusters were selected due to their relaxed morphology in X-ray observations, while the other five were chosen due to their strength as gravitational lenses.

== History ==
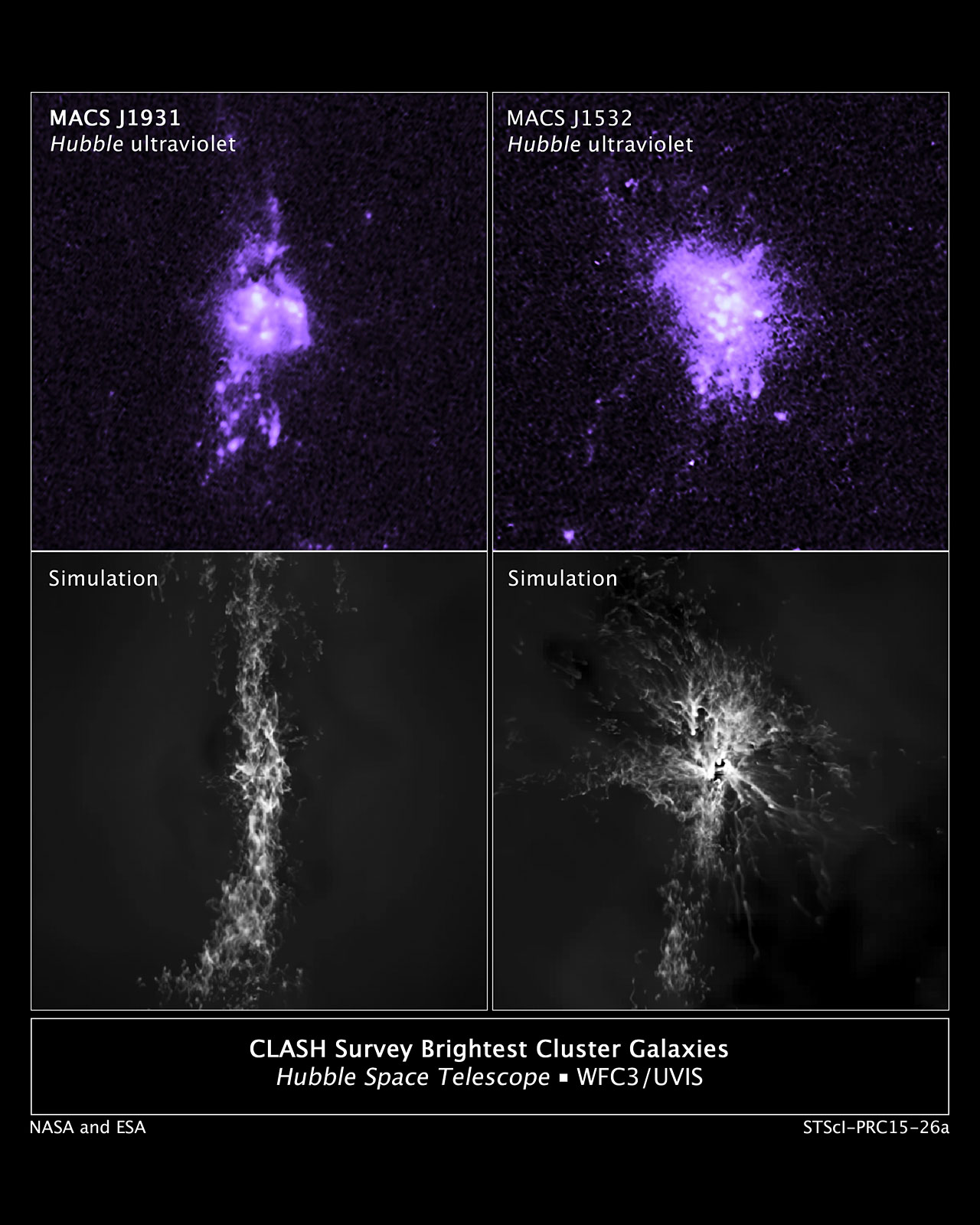
CLASH Survey Brightest Cluster Galaxies and Simulations.

As of November 2012, the CLASH has surveyed 20 clusters out of the 25. One of the galaxy clusters, MACS J0647+7015 was found to have gravitationally lensed the most distant galaxy (MACS0647-JD) then ever imaged, in 2012.

In 2013, one study utilizing CLASH data found that RX J1347.5-1145 had intense gravitational bending of light such that 8 images of the same object were detected. (See Gravitational lensing)

== Clusters under observation ==
List of clusters is:

Galaxy cluster	Right Ascension	Declination	Redshift	Notes
Abell 209 (ACO 209)	01:31:52.57	-13:36:38.8	0.206	
Abell 383 (ACO 383)	02:48:03.36	-03:31:44.7	0.187	
MACS0329.7-0211	03:29:41.68	-02:11:47.7	0.450	
MACS0429.6-0253	04:29:36.10	-02:53:08.0	0.399	
MACS0744.9+3927	07:44:52.80	+39:27:24.4	0.686	
Abell 611 (ACO 611)	08:00:56.83	+36:03:24.1	0.288	
MACS1115.9+0129	11:15:52.05	+01:29:56.6	0.352	
Abell 1423 (ACO 1423)	11:57:17.26	+33:36:37.4	0.213	
MACS1206.2-0847	12:06:12.28	-08:48:02.4	0.440	
CLJ1226.9+3332 (ClG J1226.9+3332)	12:26:58.37	+33:32:47.4	0.890	
MACS1311.0-0310	13:11:01.67	-03:10:39.5	0.494	
RX J1347.5-1145	13:47:30.59	-11:45:10.1	0.451	(Note: One of the most X-ray luminous and most massive cluster known, with an X-ray luminosity in excess of 10^45^erg/s. Magellan Spectroscopy of the Galaxy Cluster RX J1347.5-1145: Redshift Estimates for the Gravitationally Lensed Arcs)
MACS1423.8+2404	14:23:47.76	+24:04:40.5	0.545	
RXJ1532.9+3021	15:32:53.78	+30:20:58.7	0.345	
MACS1720.3+3536	17:20:16.95	+35:36:23.6	0.391	
Abell 2261 (ACO 2261)	17:22:27.25	+32:07:58.6	0.224	
MACS1931.8-2635	19:31:49.66	-26:34:34.0	0.352	
RXJ2129.7+0005	21:29:39.94	+00:05:18.8	0.234	
MS2137-2353	21:40:15.18	-23:39:40.7	0.313	
RXJ2248.7-4431 (Abell 1063S / ACO 1063S)	22:48:44.29	-44:31:48.4	0.348	
MACS0416.1-2403	04:16:09.39	-24:04:03.9	0.42	
MACS0647.8+7015	06:47:50.03	+70:14:49.7	0.584	
MACS0717.5+3745	07:17:31.65	+37:45:18.5	0.548	
MACS1149.6+2223	11:49:35.86	+22:23:55.0	0.544	
MACS2129.4-0741	21:29:26.06	-07:41:28.8	0.570	
