= Abell 209 =

Galaxy cluster in the constellation Cetus

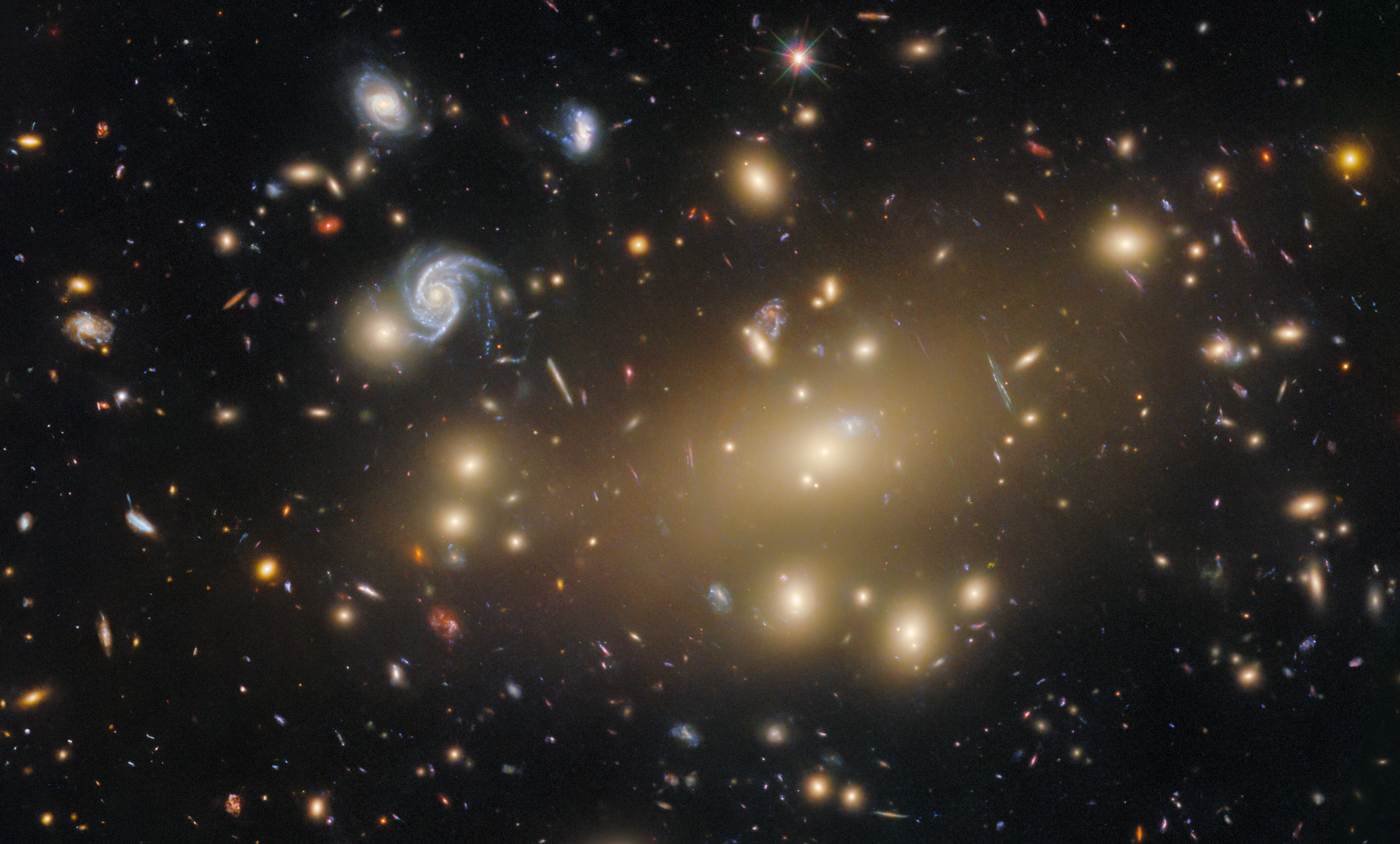
- Abell 209 imaged by the Hubble Space Telescope

Observation data (Epoch J2000)
- Constellation: Cetus
- Right ascension: 01^{h} 31^{m} 53.0000^{s}
- Declination: −13° 36′ 34.000″
- Brightest member: ABELL 0209 BCG
- Richness class: 3
- Bautz–Morgan classification: II-III
- Redshift: 0.209
- Distance: 919.97 ± 64.45 Mpc (3,001 ± 210 Mly)

Other designations
- ACO 209, 1RXS J013152.8-133651, ACT-CL J0131.8-1336

Abell 209 is a galaxy cluster located in the constellation Cetus at a distance of about 3 billion light-years from Earth. Included in Abell catalogue compiled by George O. Abell in 1958, it has a wealth class 3 (clusters consisting of 130-199 galaxies), and is of type II-III in the Bautz–Morgan classification.

Abell 209 was one of 25 galaxy clusters studied with the Hubble Space Telescope during an observational campaign, called the Cluster Lensing and Supernova survey with Hubble (CLASH), over a three-and-a-half-year period, from 2010 to 2013. Its redshift has been recalculated, now estimated at z = 0.209 (previously 0.206).

Abell 209 is located in the vicinity of Abell 222, from which it is separated by a distance of about 19.2 megaparsecs (62.6 million light-years).

== See also ==
- Abell 370
- Abell catalogue
- List of Abell clusters
- X-ray astronomy
