= Abell 223 =

Galaxy cluster in the constellation Cetus

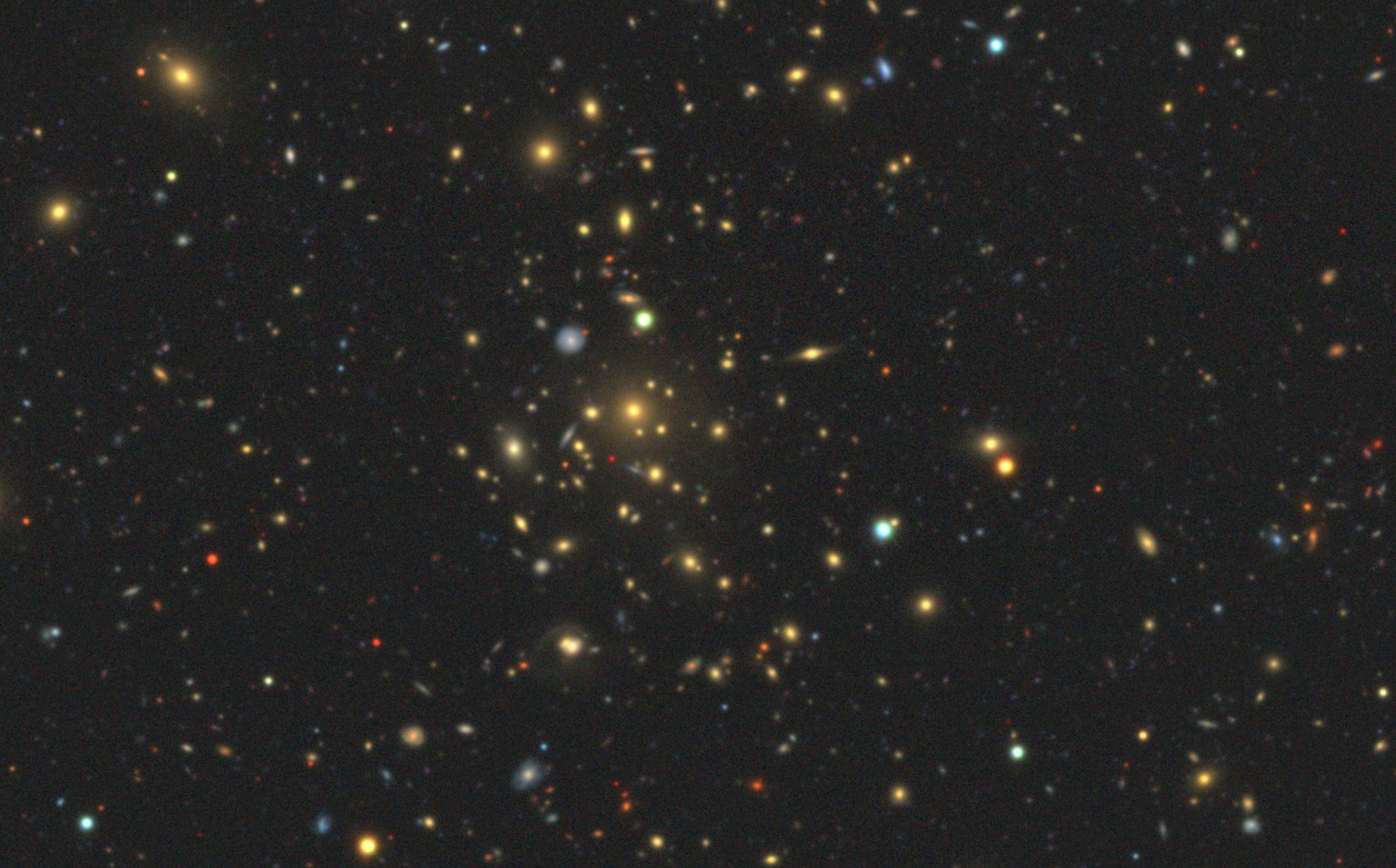
- Abell 223 seen by DESI Legacy Surveys DR11

Observation data (Epoch J2000)
- Constellation: Cetus
- Right ascension: 01^{h} 37^{m} 55.9^{s}
- Declination: −12° 49′ 11″
- Brightest member: LEDA 947139
- Richness class: 3
- Bautz–Morgan classification: III
- Velocity dispersion: 1,032 km/s
- Redshift: 0.2079 ± 0.0008
- Distance: 2.4 Gly (740 Mpc)
- ICM temperature: 4.38 ± 0.16

Other designations
- RXC J0137.9-1248

Abell 223 is a galaxy cluster. It is located at a distance of 2.4 billion light-years from Earth. The cluster is connected to nearby cluster Abell 222 by a filament of matter. Research has shown that only 20% of that matter is normal. The rest is thought to be dark matter. This means that this would form the Abell 222/ Abell 223 Supercluster as we understand them.

== See also ==
- Abell catalogue
- List of Abell clusters

== Gallery ==
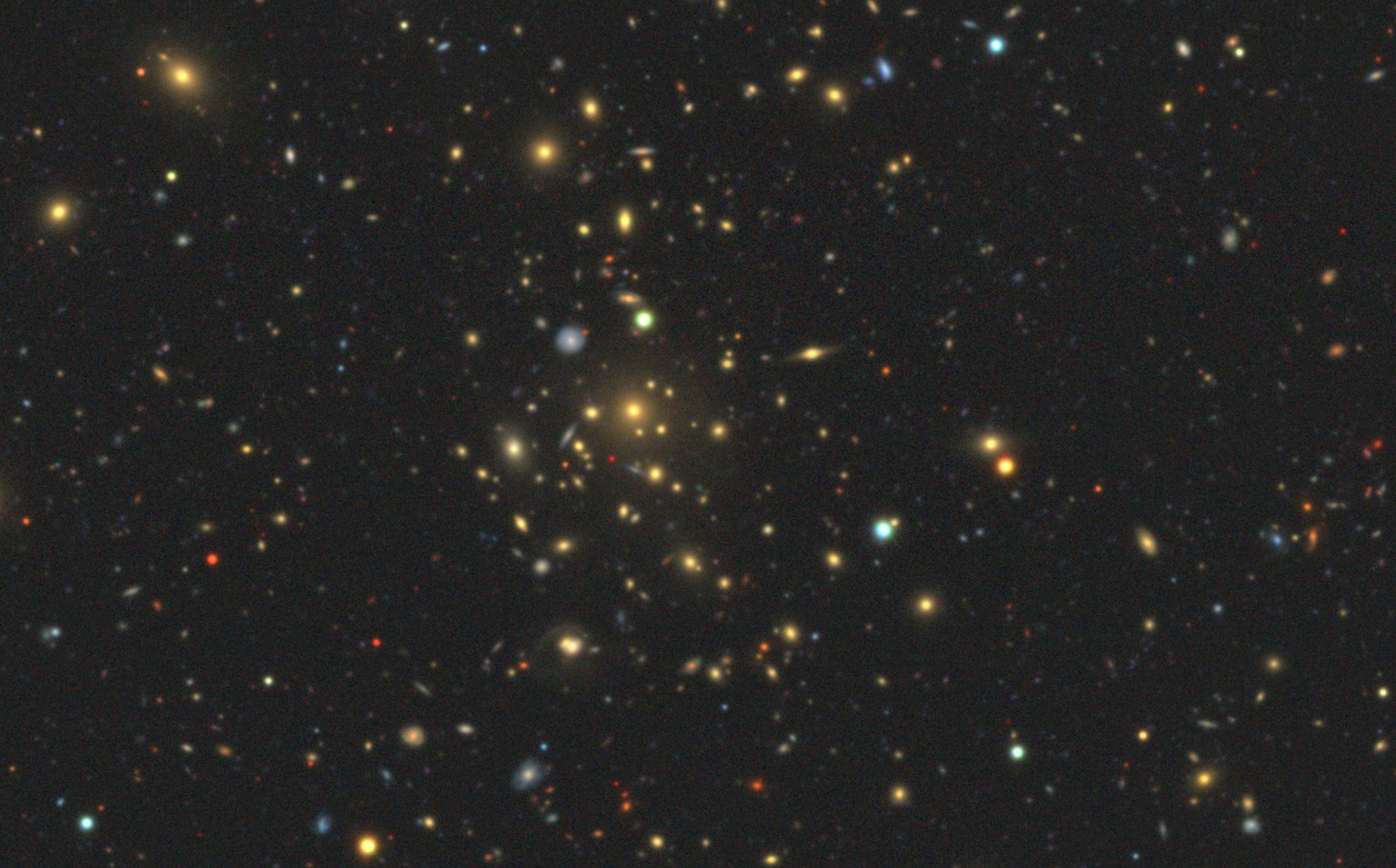
Abell 233 seen by DESI Legacy Surveys

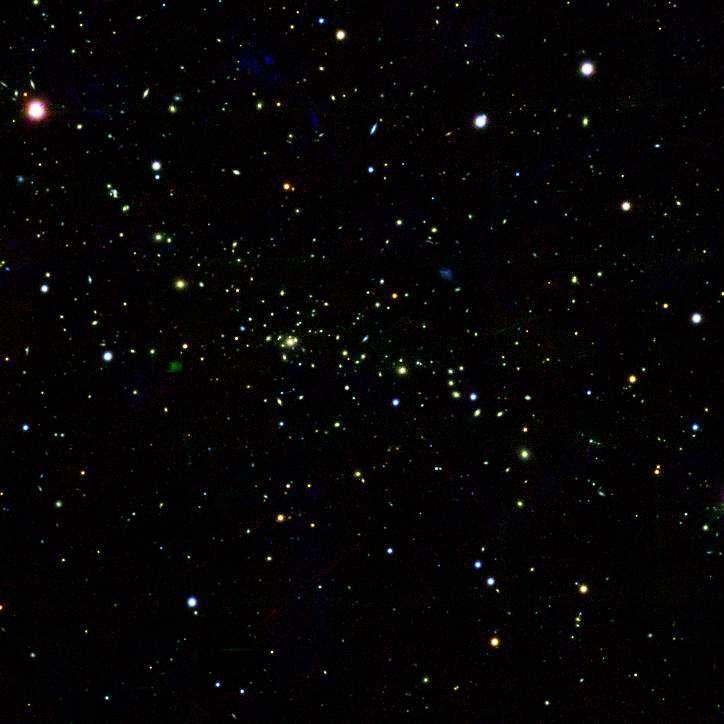
Abell 223
