= MACS 1423-z7p64 =

Galaxy in the constellation Boötes

Observation data (J2000 epoch)
- Constellation: Boötes
- Right ascension: 14^{h} 23^{m} 46.177^{s}
- Declination: 24° 4^{m} 10.758^{s}
- Redshift: 7.640 ± 0.001
- Heliocentric radial velocity: 2,287,417 km/s (1,421,335 mi/s)
- Galactocentric velocity: 2,287,467 km/s (1,421,366 mi/s)
- Distance: 13.1 billion ly (4.0 billion pc) (light travel distance) ≈30 billion ly (9.2 billion pc) (comoving distance)

Other designations
- [HBT2017] MACS1423-z7p64, [STB2016] Anc 01567

MACS 1423-z7p64 is a galaxy listed in the MAssive Cluster Survey (MACS), and announced on 10 April 2017 in the journal Nature Astronomy, as being the most distant source of reionization known at this time, with a redshift z = 7.640 ± 0.001 (lookback time >13.1 Gyr).

== Discovery ==
MACS 1423-z7p64 was discovered through gravitational lensing by MACS J1423.8+2404 (z = 0.545), a cluster that magnified its brightness by a factor of 10. To identify the galaxy, the astronomers used the slitless grism spectrograph of the Wide Field Infrared Survey Telescope on the Hubble Space Telescope, and to determine its distance the Multi-Object Spectrometer for Infra-Red Exploration (MOSFIRE) detector of the Keck Observatory.

Nature received the paper on 27 October 2016.)

== Importance ==
With a redshift z = 7.640 ± 0.001, and being an order of magnitude lower in intensity than the four other Lyman-α emitters currently known at z > 7.5, it is probably the most distant representative source of reionization found to date. This is from a time when the universe was around 700 million years old.
