= UDFj-39546284 =

High red-shift structure in the constellation Fornax

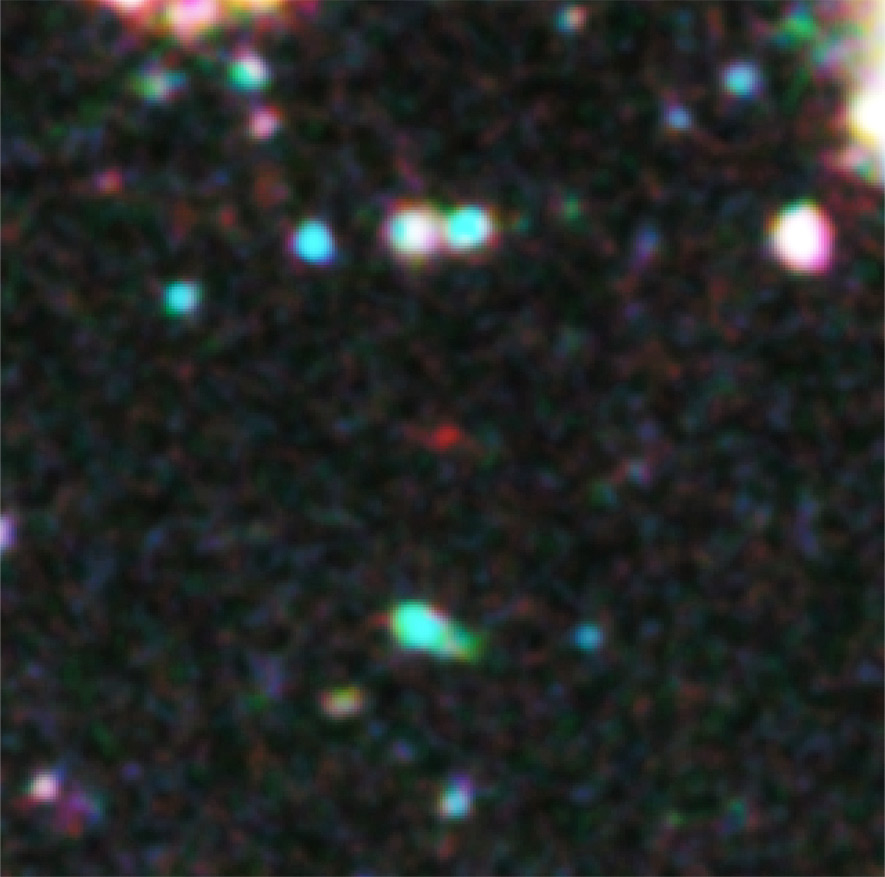
- Hubble Space Telescope image of UDFj-39546284 (seen as a reddish spot in the center of the image)

Observation data (J2000 epoch)
- Constellation: Fornax
- Right ascension: 03^{h} 32^{m} 39.54^{s}
- Declination: −27° 46′ 28.5″
- Redshift: 11.58+0.05 −0.05
- Apparent magnitude (V): V fainter than 30.1; H_{160} = 28.92 ± 0.18; J_{125} – H_{160} > 2

Other designations
- [MDB2013] UDF12-3954-6285, JADES-GS-z11-0

UDFj-39546284 is a high-redshift Lyman-break galaxy discovered by the Hubble Space Telescope in infrared Hubble Ultra-Deep Field (HUDF) observations in 2009. The object, located in the constellation Fornax, was identified by G. Illingworth (UC Santa Cruz), R. Bouwens (UC Santa Cruz and Leiden University) and the HUDF09 Team during 2009 and 2010. It was reported with a redshift of z~10 using Hubble and Spitzer Space Telescope photometric data, with later reports in 2012 suggesting a possibly higher redshift of z = 11.9 Although doubts were raised that this galaxy could instead be a low-redshift interloper with extreme spectral emission lines producing the appearance of a very high redshift source, later spectroscopic observations by the James Webb Space Telescope's NIRSpec instrument in 2022 confirmed the galaxy's high redshift to a spectroscopically confirmed estimate of z = 11.58.

== Gallery ==
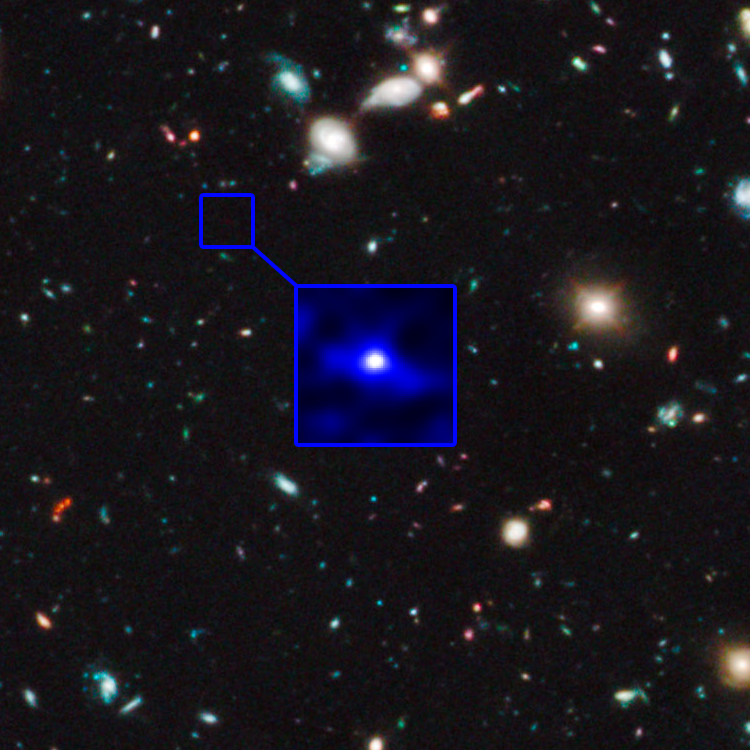
UDFj-39546284

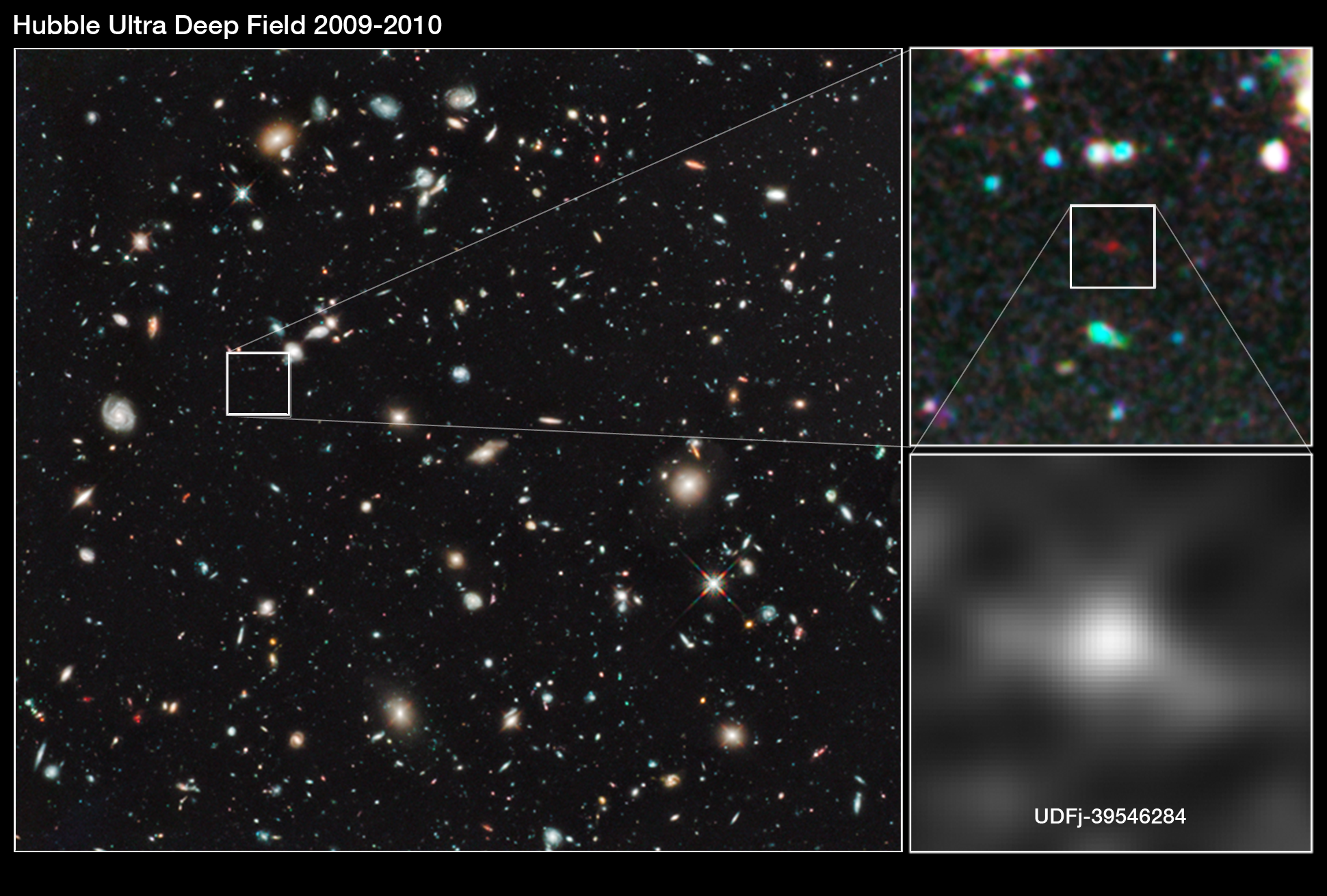
UDFj-39546284 appears as a faint red blob

== See also ==
- EGSY8p7
- Hubble Ultra-Deep Field
- List of the most distant astronomical objects
- MACS0647-JD
- Reionization
- UDFy-38135539

Preceded by UDFy-38135539	Most distant galaxy known 2011 — 2012	Succeeded by MACS0647-JD
Preceded by MACS0647-JD	Most distant galaxy known 2012	Succeeded by BDF-3299
