= MACS J0025.4-1222 =

Galaxy cluster

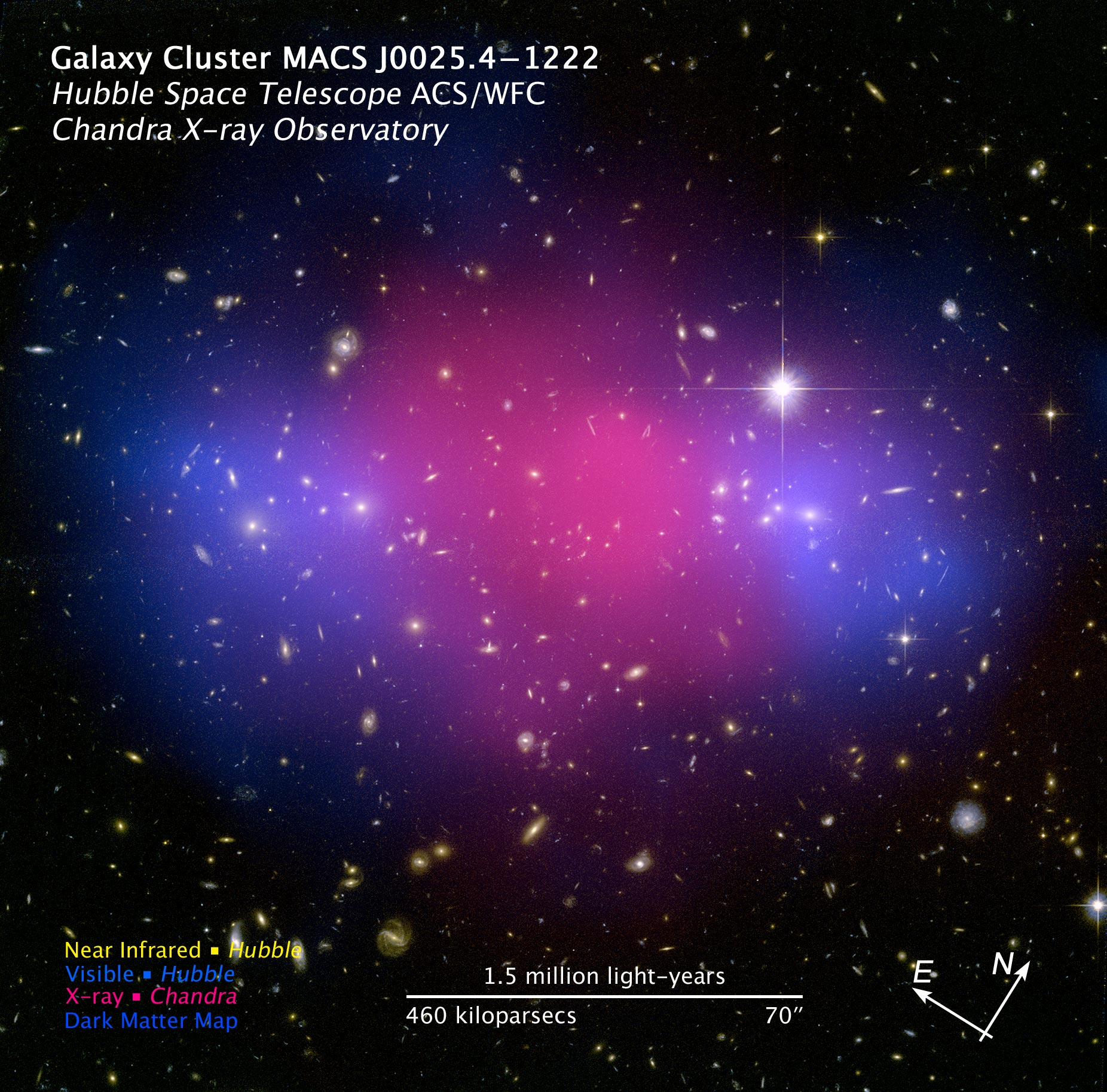
- Composite image of separate exposures made by Hubble Space Telescope ACS and WFPC2 detectors and the Chandra ACIS detector

Observation data (Epoch )
- Constellation: Cetus
- Right ascension: 00h 25m 29s.80
- Declination: -12° 22' 46".99
- Redshift: 0.586
- Distance: 6.07 Gly / 1.725 Gpc

MACS J0025.4-1222 is a galaxy cluster created by the collision of two galaxy clusters, and is part of the MAssive Cluster Survey (MACS). Like the earlier discovered Bullet Cluster, this cluster shows a clear separation between the centroid of the intergalactic gas (of majority of the normal, or baryonic, mass) and the colliding clusters.

In the image, intergalactic gas is shown in pink and the mass centroids of the colliding clusters in blue, showing the separation of the two, similar to the Bullet Cluster. It provides independent, direct evidence for dark matter and supports the view that dark matter particles interact with each other only very weakly.

== Details ==
The shown image is a composite of separate exposures made by Hubble Space Telescope ACS and WFPC2 detectors and the Chandra ACIS detector. The Hubble images were taken on November 5, 2006, and June 6, 2007. The visible light images from Hubble showed gravitational lensing which allowed astronomers to infer the distribution of total mass (both dark matter and normal matter)(colored in blue). The distribution of normal matter is mostly in the form of hot gas glowing brightly in X-rays (shown pink). Its distribution was accurately mapped from Chandra data. From these it was possible to tell that most of the mass in the two blue regions was dark matter.

The international team of astronomers in this study was led by Marusa Bradac of the University of California, Santa Barbara, and Steve Allen of the Kavli Institute for Particle Astrophysics and Cosmology at Stanford University and the Stanford Linear Accelerator Center (SLAC).

The two clusters that formed MACS J0025 are each almost a quadrillion times the mass of the Sun. They merged at speeds of millions of miles per hour, and as they did so the hot gas in each cluster collided with the hot gas in the other and slowed down. The dark matter (which interacts weakly) did not. The separation between the normal matter (pink) and dark matter (blue) therefore provides direct evidence for dark matter and supports the view that dark matter particles interact with each other almost entirely through gravity.
