= RX J1347.5−1145 =

Galaxy cluster in the constellation Virgo

RX J1347.5-1145
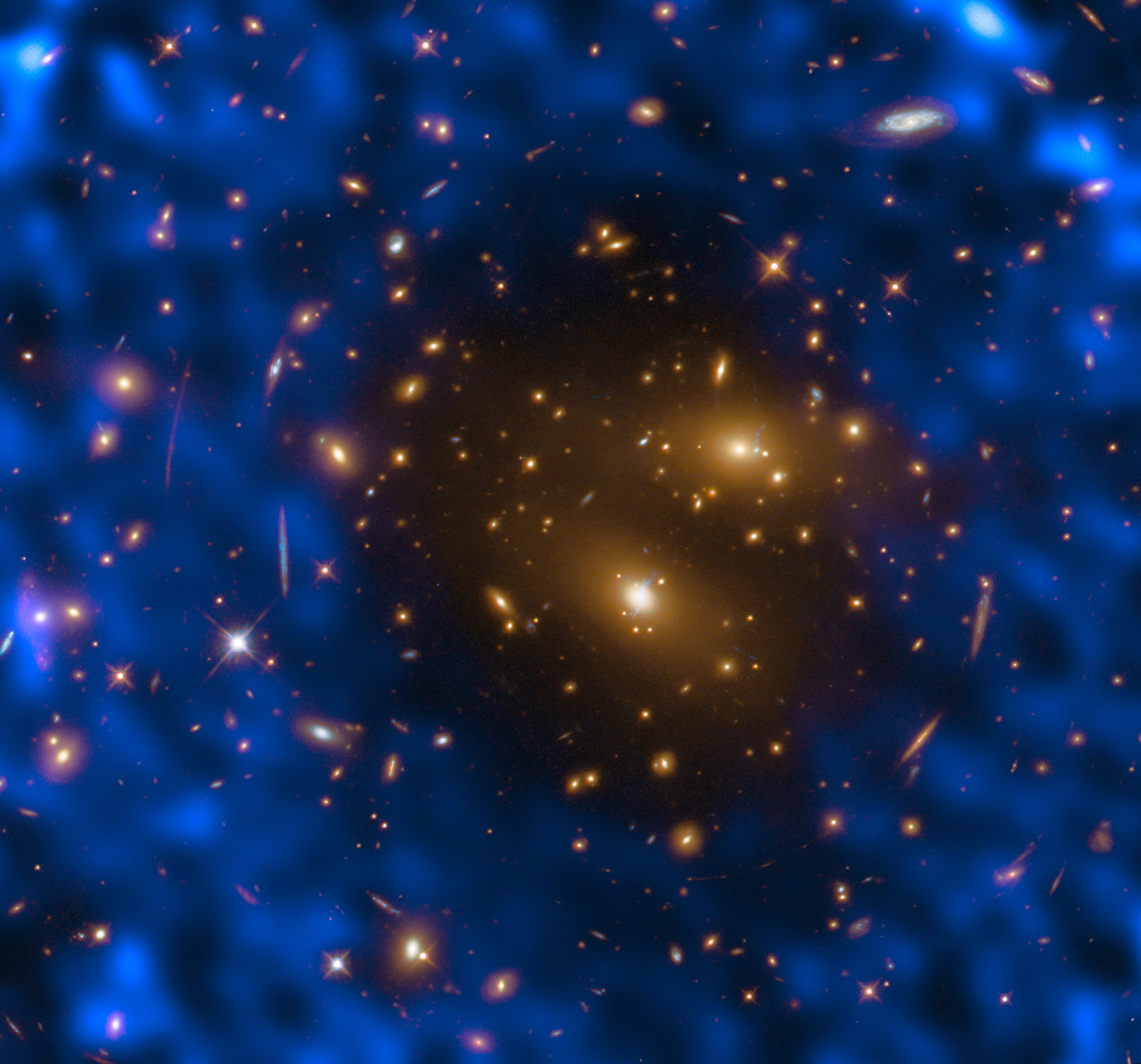
- Thermal measurement of the Sunyaev-Zeldovich effect in a picture that was taken by the Atacama Large Millimeter Array in Chile showing the blue and violet hues. The Sunyaev-zeldovich effects were taken as the first thermal measurements.

Observation data (Epoch )
- Constellation: Virgo
- Right ascension: 13^{h} 47^{m} 33.5^{s}
- Declination: −11° 45′ 42″
- Redshift: z = 0.451
- Distance: 5 billion ly (1.533 Gpc)
- X-ray luminosity: 1×10^{45} ergs

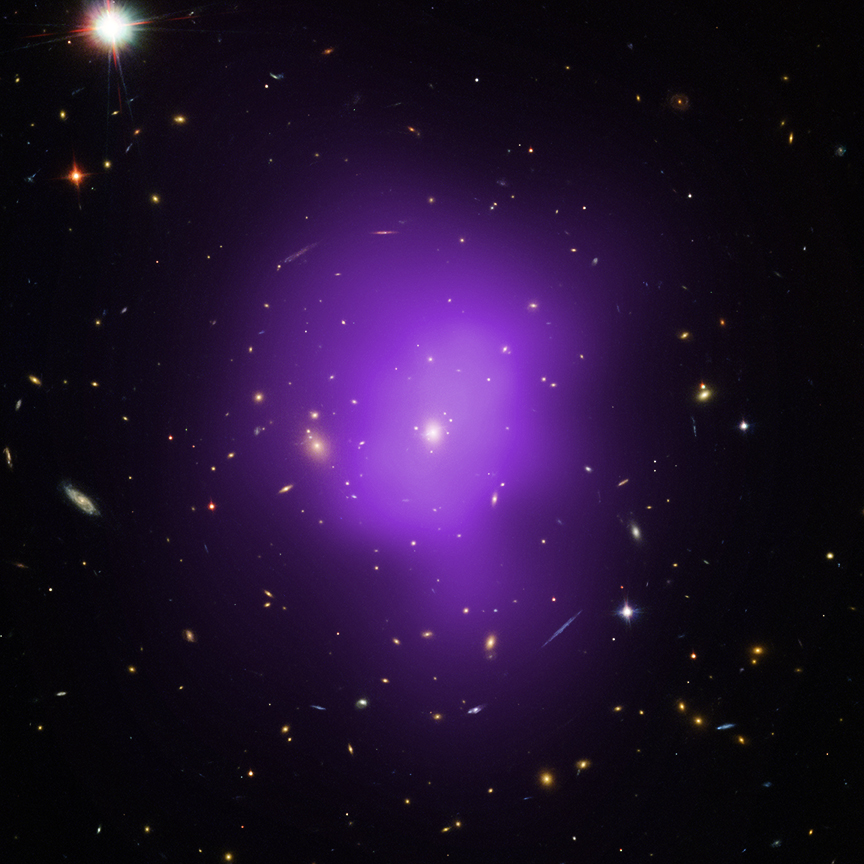
RX J1347.5-1145 in a composite image, which was taken by the Hubble Space Telescope in an optical and X-ray version of the image.

RX J1347.5–1145 is one of the most massive galaxy clusters known discovered in X-rays with ROSAT. As a result, it is also one of the most X-ray-luminous because of its hot gas content. The object resides roughly 5 billion light-years away from the Solar System in the constellation of Virgo. Redshift was noted as z=0.451 with an X-ray luminosity of 10^{45} ergs s^{−1} in a paper from 2002. In 2013, one study found eight cases of the same object resulting from the intense gravitational bending of light, which makes it possible to identify a series of remote galaxies located inside the galaxy cluster with calculations from the photometric method between 5.5 and 7.5. That study made use of data from Cluster Lensing and Supernova survey with Hubble (CLASH) as well as other sources. The colors in the galaxy cluster are known to correspond with the level of brightness, or the number of electrons trapped in the examined wavelength range of the cluster, with the colors red, orange, and yellow as high intensity, blue-green and green as medium intensity, and blue and violet as low intensity. It is considered one of the brightest objects that is known by X-ray.

The brightest galaxy inside RX J1347.5-1145 is the elliptical GALEX J134730.7-114509. The temperature along with the entropy maps show cool, entropic gases trailing the subcluster in a southwesterly direction, which is consistent with core shredding. The overall gas density, temperature, and metallicity are in good agreement with each other. The hot intracluster medium has an extension to the southeast along with a little indication of two cD galaxies located within the cluster.

== Radio observations ==
The first radio observations were taken in the years of 1999 and 2001 of the Sunyaev-Zeldovich effect located inside RX J1347.5-1145, along with the higher angular resolution (at approximately 150 GHz) which showed the stronger signal along with the enchantment, which is known to be located southeast of the cluster's center, the same location as the surface brightness extension viewed by X-Rays. Since the SZ intensity is proportional to the integrated gas pressure combined along with the light of sight, the strong SZ signal was interpreted due to too much hot gas in the cluster, which was probably caused by the merging of a subcluster along with the primary cluster. The presence of (kT ≥ 15 keV) gas in the southeast portion of the cluster has been cited, reported, and confirmed by Chandra.

== X-Ray data analysis ==
The galaxy cluster was observed for over 80 kiloseconds (~22 hours) over three Chandra X-ray Observatory observation windows, which the first two observations were in perspective by ACIS-S and the third one by ACIS-I. The glare projection was known to be done using the 2.5-7 keV and the 9.0-12 keV bands, which excluded the regions that were known to contain point sources and cluster emission.

Proper estimation of the X-Ray background in the galaxy cluster is known to be critical for spectral arrays of faint, extended emission from the cluster, along with the use of the blank sky data sets from the Chandra calibration Database. Overall background normalization was used to measure the ratio of the count rate of high energy frequences (which is known to be around 9-12 keV).
