= Abell 2261 =

Galaxy cluster in the constellation of Hercules

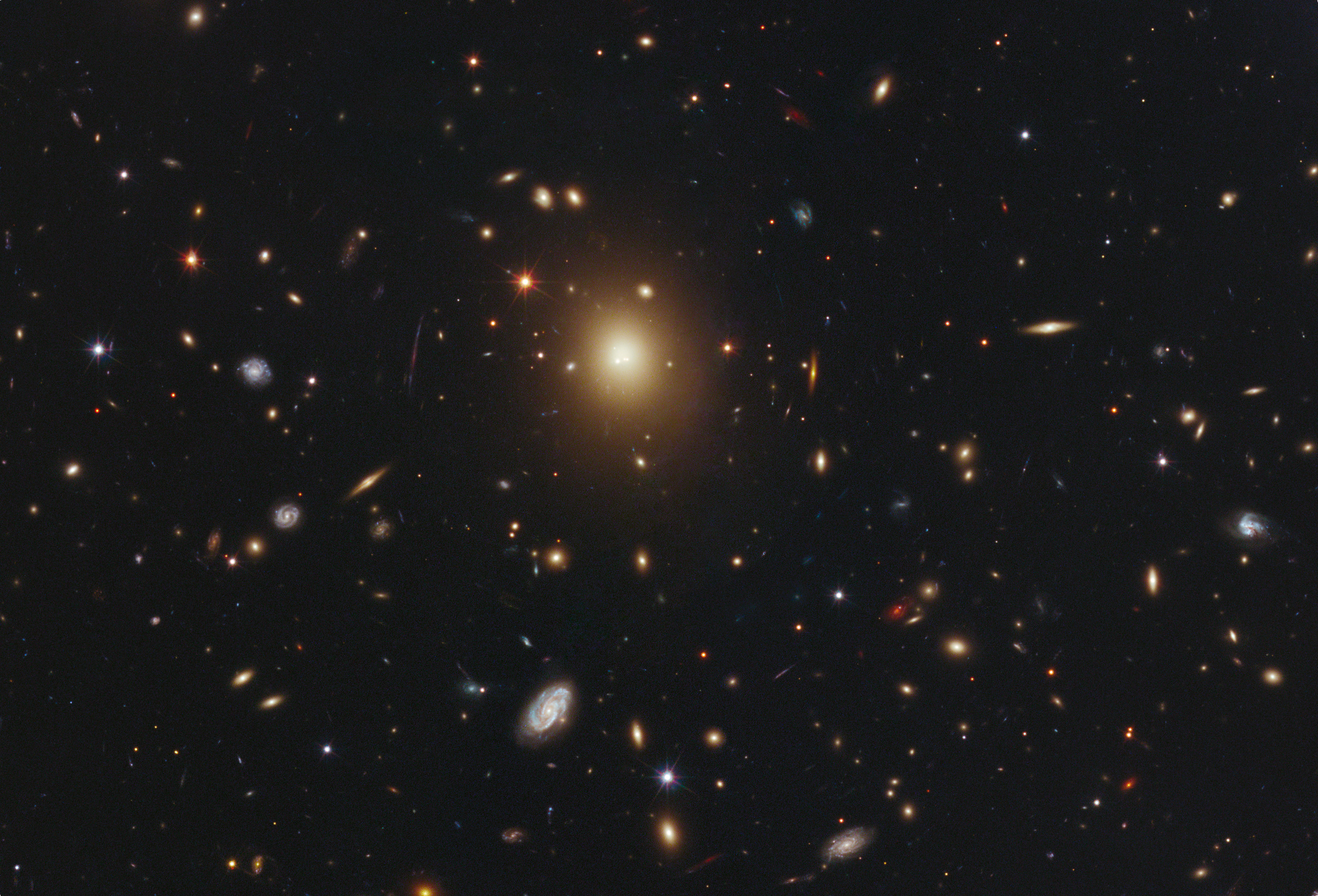
- Abell 2261

Observation data (Epoch J2000)
- Constellation: Hercules
- Right ascension: 17^{h} 22^{m} 26.9^{s}
- Declination: +32° 07′ 58″
- Redshift: 0.224
- Distance: 909 Mpc (3 Gly) h^{−1}_{0.70}
- ICM temperature: 7.6 ± 0.30 keV
- Binding mass: 2.9 ± 0.5×10^{14} h^{−1}_{0.70} M_{☉}
- X-ray luminosity: 18.0 ± 0.2 ×10^{44} erg s^{−1} (bolometric)

Abell 2261 is one of 25 galaxy clusters being studied as part of the Cluster Lensing And Supernova survey with Hubble (CLASH) program, a major project to build a library of scientific data on lensing clusters.

It also has the galaxy A2261-BCG (short for Abell 2261 Brightest Cluster Galaxy) which has one of the largest galaxy cores ever observed.

In January 2021, astronomers using the Hubble Space Telescope were reported to be unable to locate a supermassive black hole presumed to be at the center of the galaxy. A newer and larger space telescope, the James Webb Space Telescope, launched in December 2021, may help determine the object's whereabouts, according to the astronomers.
