= A2261-BCG =

Galaxy in the constellation Hercules

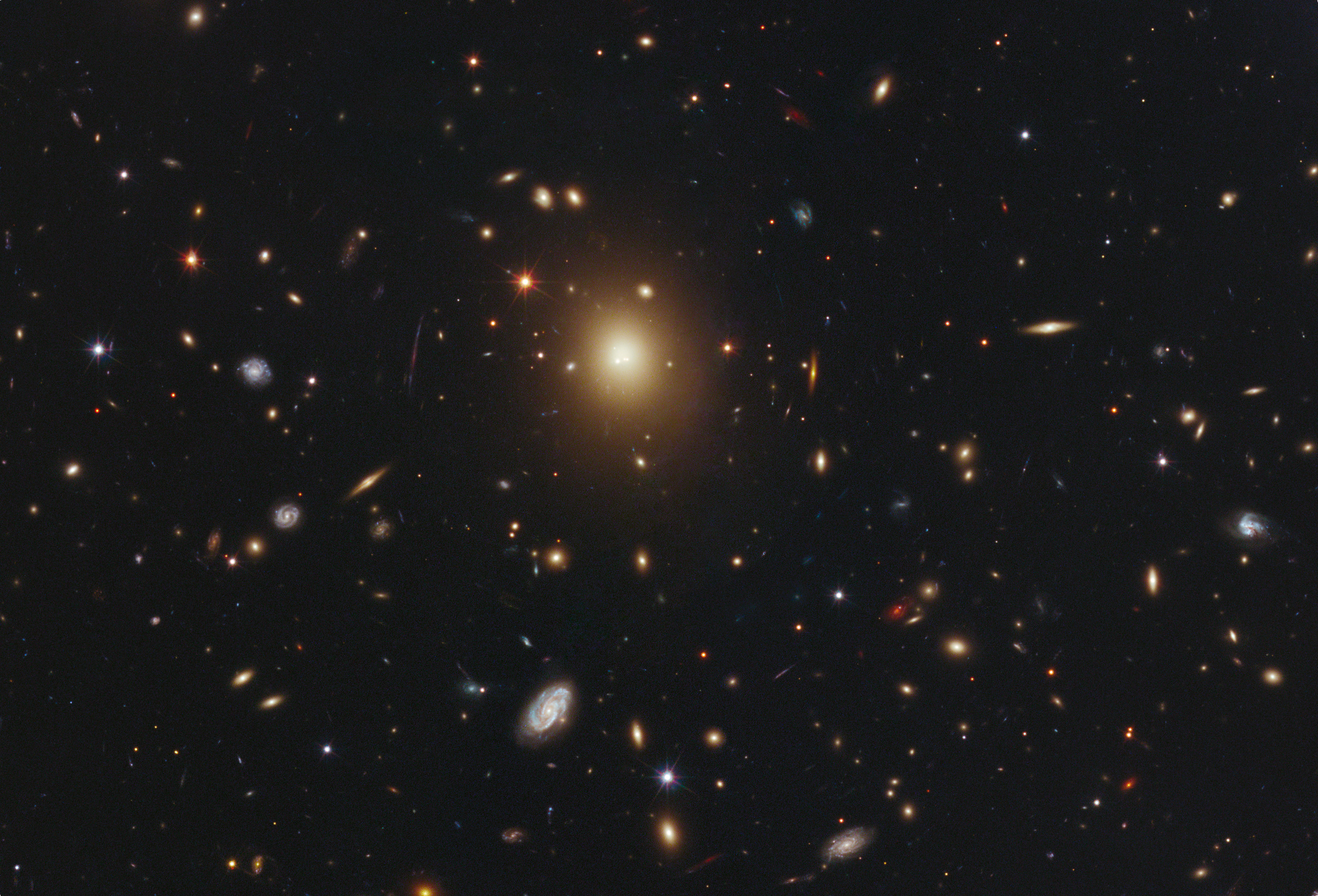
- The Abell 2261 galaxy cluster, with A2261-BCG the bright elliptical galaxy near the top center.

Observation data (J2000 epoch)
- Constellation: Hercules
- Right ascension: 17^{h} 22^{m} 27.173^{s}
- Declination: +32° 07′ 57.18″
- Redshift: 0.223263±0.000041
- Heliocentric radial velocity: 66,933±12 km/s
- Galactocentric velocity: 67,103±14 km/s
- Distance: 992.5 ± 69.5 Mpc (3,237 ± 226.7 Mly)h^{−1}_{0.6774} (Note: The distance estimate in this infobox was based on the galaxy's redshift.)
- Group or cluster: Abell 2261
- Apparent magnitude (V): 19.2

Characteristics
- Type: cD
- Number of stars: 10 trillion (10^{13})
- Size: 544,620 ly × 533,790 ly (166.98 kpc × 163.66 kpc) (diameter; 2MASS K-band total isophote) (Note: The quick-look major axis physical diameter given by NED of 151.74 by 148.71 kiloparsecs (495,000 by 485,000 light-years) was based on a distance estimate of 902 ± 141.359 megaparsecs (2,942 ± 461.1 million light-years). The quoted diameters in this infobox were based on NED's provided scale "Virgo + GA + Shapley" of 973 pc/arcsec multiplied by the given angular diameters.)
- Apparent size (V): 0.263′ × 0.221′

Other designations
- 2MASX J17222717+3207571, SDSS J172227.18+320757.2, PGC 1981854

A2261-BCG (short for Abell 2261 Brightest Cluster Galaxy) is a supergiant elliptical galaxy in the galaxy cluster Abell 2261. One of the largest galaxies known, A2261-BCG is estimated to have an isophotal diameter of about 166.98 kiloparsecs (544,620 light-years), roughly 6 times larger than the Milky Way. It is the brightest and most massive galaxy in the cluster, and has one of the largest galactic cores ever observed, spanning over 10,000 light-years.

The cD elliptical galaxy, located at 992.5 megaparsecs (3.24 billion light-years) from Earth, is also well known as a radio source. Its core is highly populated by a dense number of old stars, but is mysteriously diffuse, giving it a large core.

== Possible supermassive black hole ==
On September 10, 2012, using Hubble Space Telescope's Wide Field Camera 3, A2261-BCG was found to contain an active supermassive black hole of at least 10 billion times the mass of the Sun (10^{10} M_{☉}) at its center. This is maybe due to a black hole merger that created gravity waves, rippling in the fabric of space, or two central black holes orbiting each other, with one of them native to the galaxy while the second black hole may have been added from a smaller former galaxy that A2261-BCG may have gobbled up. Furthermore, since a supermassive black hole will only be visible while it is accreting, a supermassive black hole can be nearly invisible, except in its effects on stellar orbits. This implies that either A2261-BGC has a central black hole that is accreting at a low level or has a mass rather below 10^{10} M_{☉}.

Despite the lack of evidence, several studies derived mass estimates for a possible central black hole, such as about between 5.37 ^{+10.83}_{−3.59} billion and 64.6 ^{+117.4}_{−41.7} billion M_{☉} (10^{9.73 ± 0.48} and 10^{10.81 ± 0.45}) using M-sigma relation (M_{σ}) and core break radius (R_{b}). or between 6 billion and 11 billion M_{☉}, which would make it one of the most massive black holes.
