= Rychard Bouwens =

American astrophysicist

Rychard J. Bouwens is an associate professor at Leiden University. He is also a former member of the Advanced Camera for Surveys Guaranteed Time Observation team and postdoctoral research astronomer at the University of California, Santa Cruz. He obtained his bachelor's degree in physics, chemistry, and mathematics from Hope College. He then went on to earn his Ph.D. in physics at the University of California, Berkeley under the supervision of Joseph Silk and also worked with Tom Broadhurst.

He works on the interpretation of high redshift starbursts. He helped create the Bouwens' Universe Construction Set (BUCS), which can simulate arbitrary galaxy fields and calculate any galaxy observables.

Throughout his career, he has broken the record for discovering the most distant galaxy in the universe, including three sources in 2015–2016 with record-breaking spectroscopic redshift measurements at z=7.73 (see EGS-zs8-1), z=8.68 (see EGSY8p7), and z=11.1 (see GN-z11). In a 2011 Nature paper, his team discovered galaxy UDFj-39546284 with a photometric redshift of ≈10 and was immediately heralded as the most distant source known in the universe. It was later estimated to have a redshift of 11.9.

In 2013, he was awarded the Pastoor Schmeitsprijs voor de Sterrenkunde, a prize in the Netherlands given to the researcher (under the age of 40) judged to have made the most significant contribution to astronomy.

In 2019, Rychard was the successful principal investigator of the REBELS ALMA Large Program, a 70-hour program to identify a substantial sample of luminous interstellar medium reservoirs in the first 800 million years of the universe at z>~6.5. Thanks to the results from the program, [CII] and dust were prominently detected in >~18 sources at z>~6.5.

Over the course of his career, Bouwens has five published papers in Nature, two as first author, one as second author, and two for Nature News & Views.
