= MACS J0647.7+7015 =

Galaxy cluster in the constellation Camelopardalis

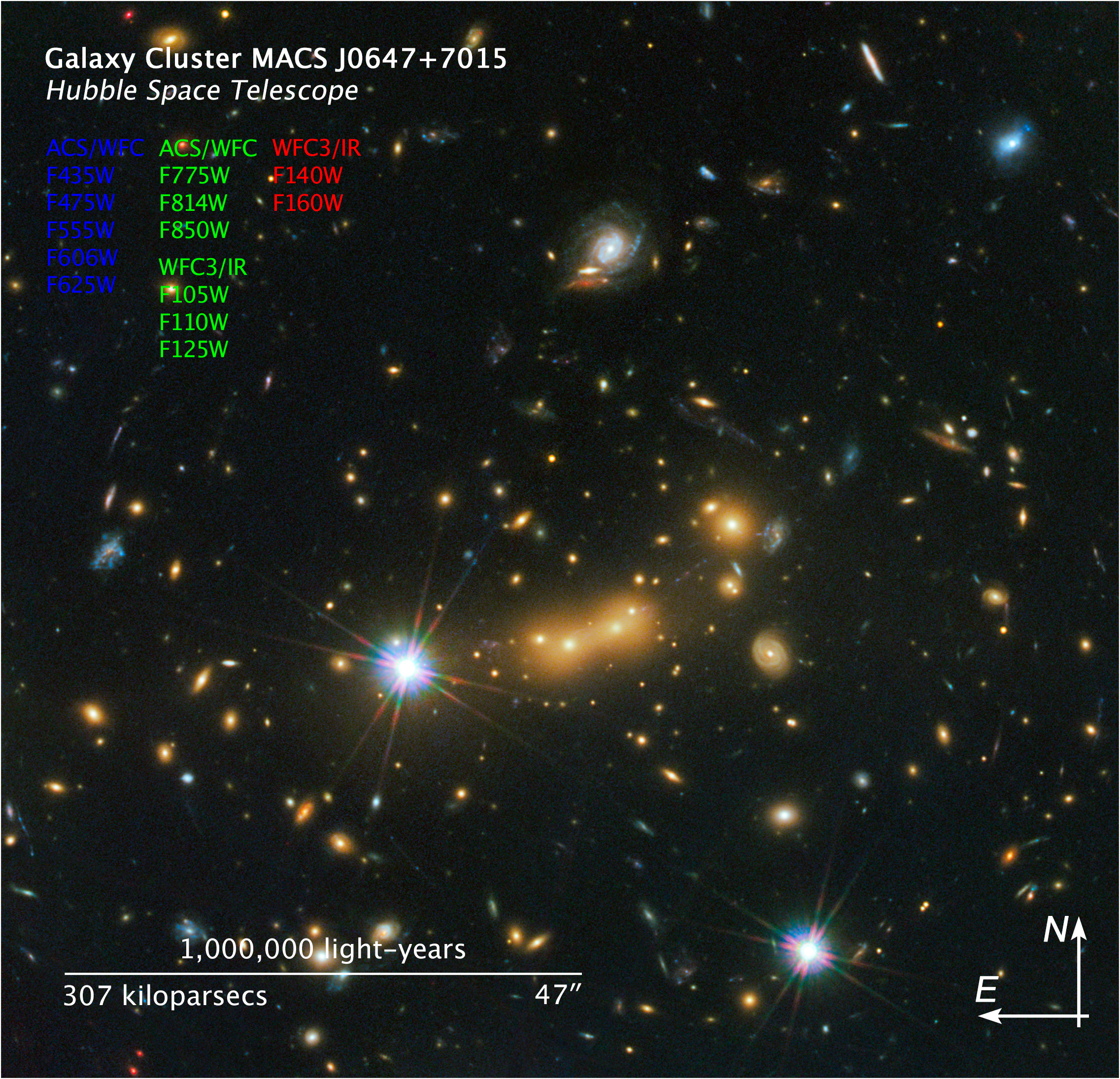
- MACS J0647.7+7015

Observation data (Epoch 2000)
- Constellation: Camelopardalis
- Right ascension: 06^{h} 47^{m} 42^{s}
- Declination: +70° 15′
- Redshift: 0.592
- Distance: 2,180 Mpc (7,110 Mly) h^{−1}_{0.70}
- ICM temperature: 13.3 ± 1.80 keV
- Binding mass: 2.07 ± 0.10×10^{14} h^{−1}_{0.70} M_{☉}
- X-ray luminosity: 32.5 ± 2.1 ×10^{44} erg s^{−1} (bolometric)

MACS J0647.7+7015 is a galaxy cluster with a redshift z = 0.592, located at J2000.0 right ascension 06^{h} 47^{m} 42^{s} declination +70° 15′. It lies between the Big Dipper and Little Dipper in the constellation Camelopardalis. It is part of a sample of 12 extreme galaxy clusters at z > 0.5 discovered by the MAssive Cluster Survey (MACS).

During 2012 the galaxy cluster was announced as gravitationally lensing the most distant galaxy (MACS0647-JD) then ever imaged (z = 11).
