= Abell 222 =

Galaxy cluster in the constellation Cetus

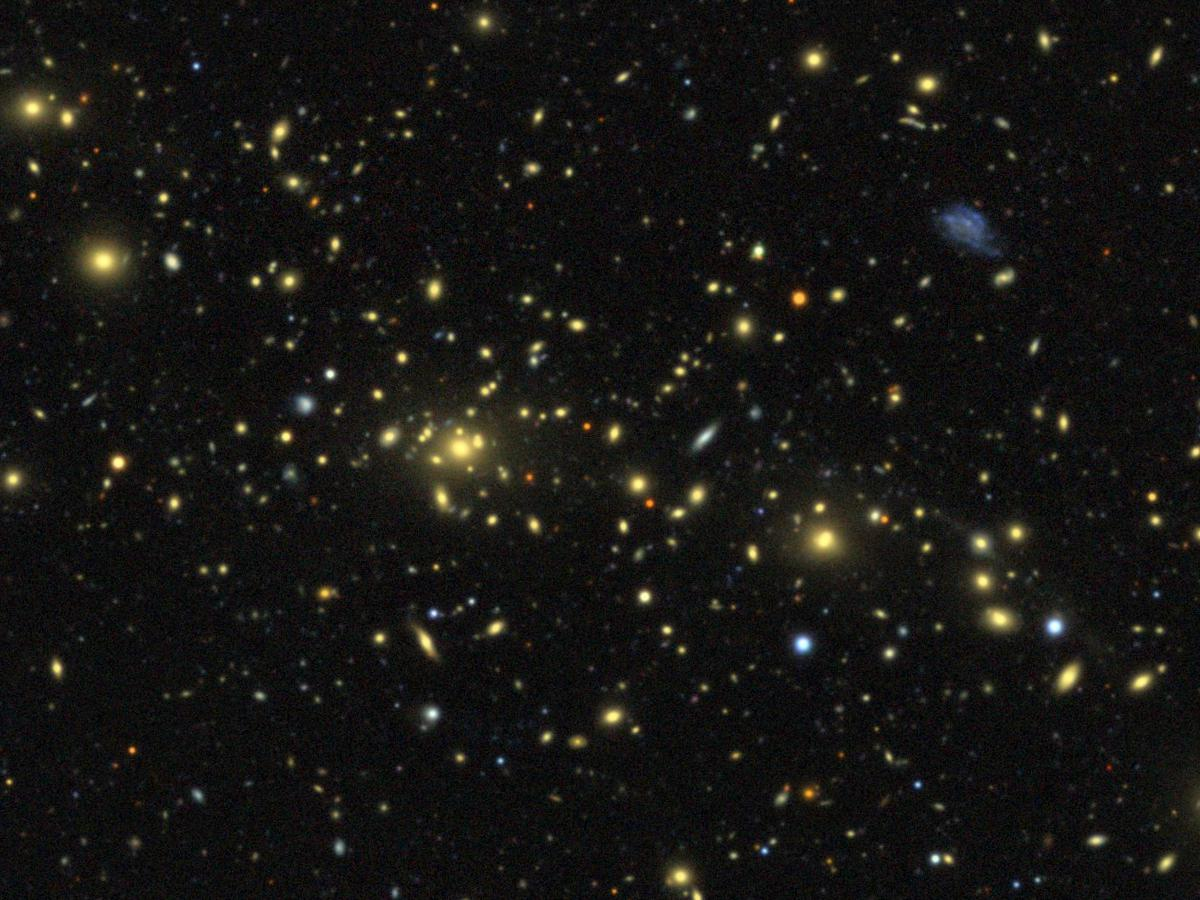
- A portion of Abell 222 imaged by Legacy Surveys

Observation data (Epoch J2000)
- Constellation: Cetus
- Right ascension: 01^{h} 37^{m} 27.4^{s}
- Declination: −12° 58′ 45″
- Brightest member: LEDA 944643
- Richness class: 3
- Bautz–Morgan classification: II-III
- Velocity dispersion: 1,014 km/s
- Redshift: 0.2110
- Distance: 2.4 Gly (740 Mpc)
- ICM temperature: 3.77 ± 0.15 keV

Other designations
- RXC J0137.4-1259

Abell 222 is a galaxy cluster in the constellation of Cetus. It holds thousands of galaxies together. It is located at a distance of 2.4 billion light-years from Earth.

== Discovery of dark matter ==
Astronomers noticed an invisible string of matter was warping spacetime between Abell 222 and Abell 223. Upon further examination by using images from the Japanese Subaru telescope, astronomers discovered that this "invisible matter" is in fact dark matter. The astronomers used gravitational lensing to detect the dark matter filaments. The cluster is connected by a filament of dark matter to Abell 223 that is permeated by hot X-ray emitting gas. Further research shows that this filament only contains about 20 percent of normal matter, the rest is assumed to be dark matter. This is seen to be in good agreement with the cosmological standard model. This means that the two bodies would form the Abell 222/Abell 223 Supercluster as defined by the IAU. Abell 222 is located in the Supercluster 13 (SCL 13), together with another 7 members, which are Abell 205, Abell 206, Abell 212, Abell 230, Abell 232, Abell 233, Abell 235 using estimated redshifts.

== Baryonic matter evidence ==
About 5% of the universe is estimated to be made up of baryonic or ordinary matter which contains protons and neutrons, also known as baryons, and electrons. Baryons and electrons are the foundation for atoms. Astronomers have not been able to locate the full 5% of baryonic matter within other galaxies, stars or gases. After observing gas that connects Abell 222 and Abell 223, scientists believe that a significant part of the missing baryonic matter is within the gas that bridges the two galaxy clusters. This was difficult to locate because the gas had a very low density, which made it hard to detect. This discovery was made possible because of Abell 222's location. It is within Earth's line of sight, so scientists were able to see a strong concentration of this extremely distant gas with the latest high-power infrared and X-ray telescopes, within a section of the sky.

== See also ==
- Abell catalogue
- List of Abell clusters
