= MACS J0717.5+3745 =

Galaxy cluster in the constellation Auriga

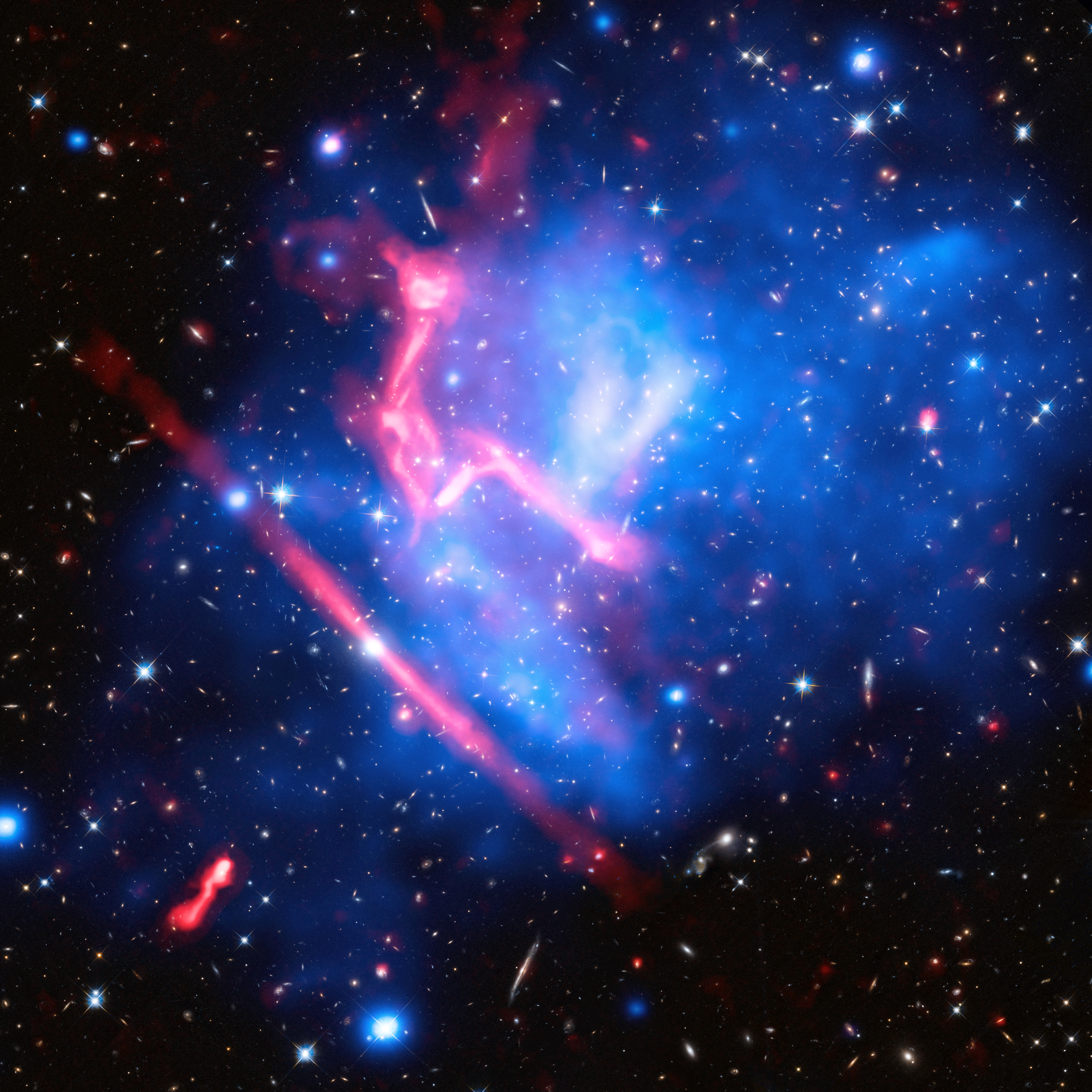
- MACS J0717.5+3745 taken by the combination of observations from the NASA/ESA Hubble Space Telescope, the NASA Chandra X-ray Observatory, and the NRAO Jansky Very Large Array.

Observation data (Epoch J2000)
- Right ascension: 07^{h} 17^{m} 36.50^{s}
- Declination: +37° 45′ 23″
- Velocity dispersion: 1660
- Redshift: 0.5458
- Binding mass: 0 M_{☉}

Other designations
- ClG J0717+3745, MCS J0717.5+3745, PLCKESZ G180.24+21.04, 1RXS J071733.8+374520, BAX 109.3900+37.7600, MCXC J0717.5+3745, RX J0717.5+3745

MACS J0717.5+3745 (MACS J0717 or MACS 0717 for short) is a large galaxy cluster located 5.4 billion light years away in the constellation Auriga, appearing in the Massive Cluster Survey (MACS).

== Description ==
The cluster was formed by four separate galaxy clusters that have been involved in a collision. This is the first time that this phenomenon has been observed. The repeated collisions in MACSJ0717 are caused by a 13-million-light-year-long stream of galaxies, gas, and dark matter, known as a filament, pouring into a region already full of matter. When two or more of the galaxy clusters collide, the hot gas in the interstellar medium slows down, but the galaxies, composed mostly of empty space, do not slow as fast. The speed and direction of each of the clusters involved in the collision can thus be approximated through examining the offset between the galaxies and the gas.

Of the four subclusters, A, B, C, D, subcluster B is moving quickly relative to the other three subclusters, which are relatively at rest in relation to each other. The quick moving B exhibits kinetic Sunyaev-Zel'dovich effect (SZ effect for short), the first time this has been observed in an object, instead of statistically. The B subcluster's kinetic SZ effect was discovered due to its lack of a thermal SZ effect, unlike the other three subclusters.

MACS J0717 forms one of the largest known Einstein rings, with gravitational lensing distorting the light that reaches us from several adjacent phenomena.

== Gallery ==
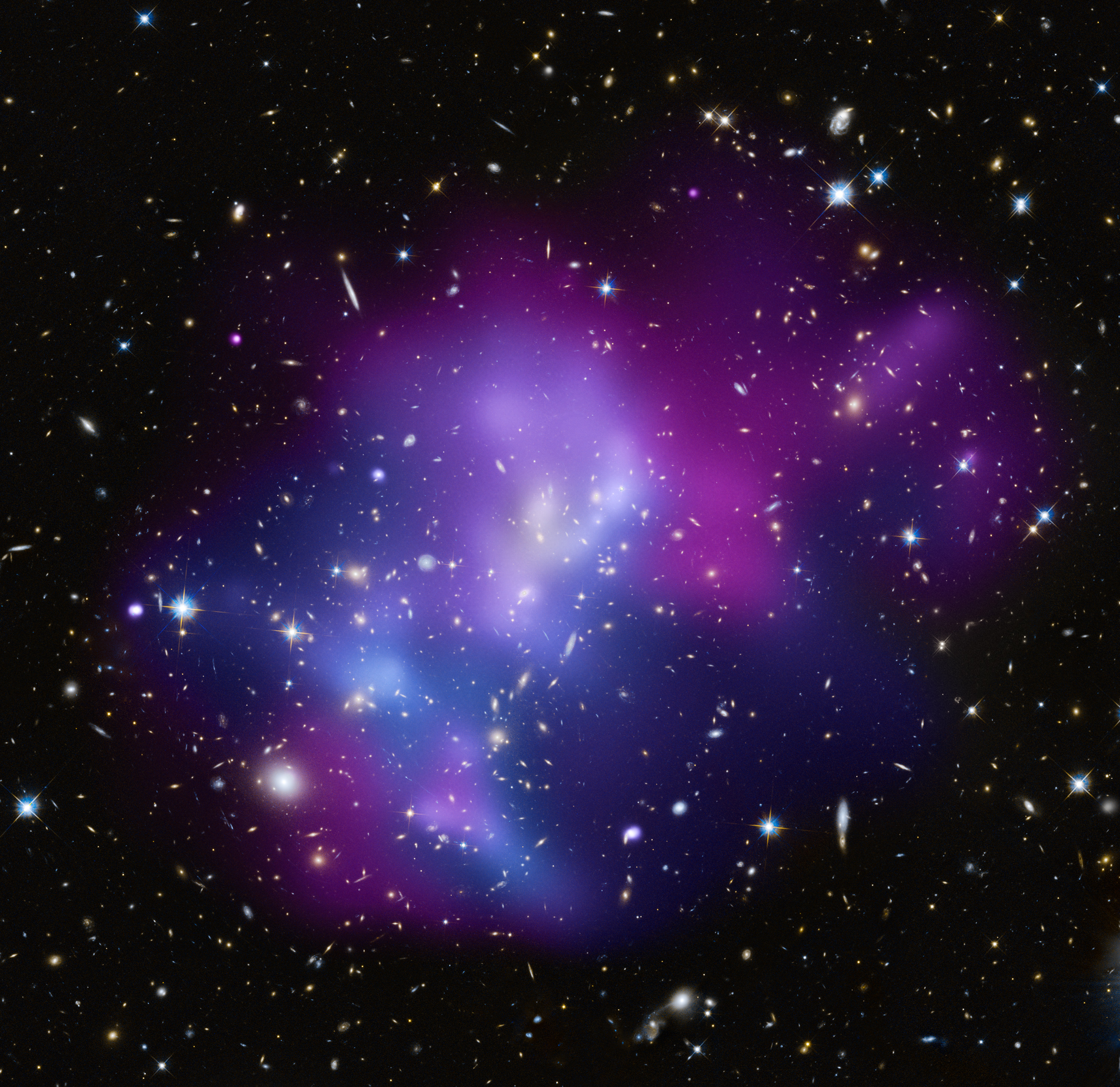
Composite image of the massive galaxy cluster MACS J0717.5+3745 from NASA's Chandra X-ray Observatory. Image size is roughly 7.7 million light years across.

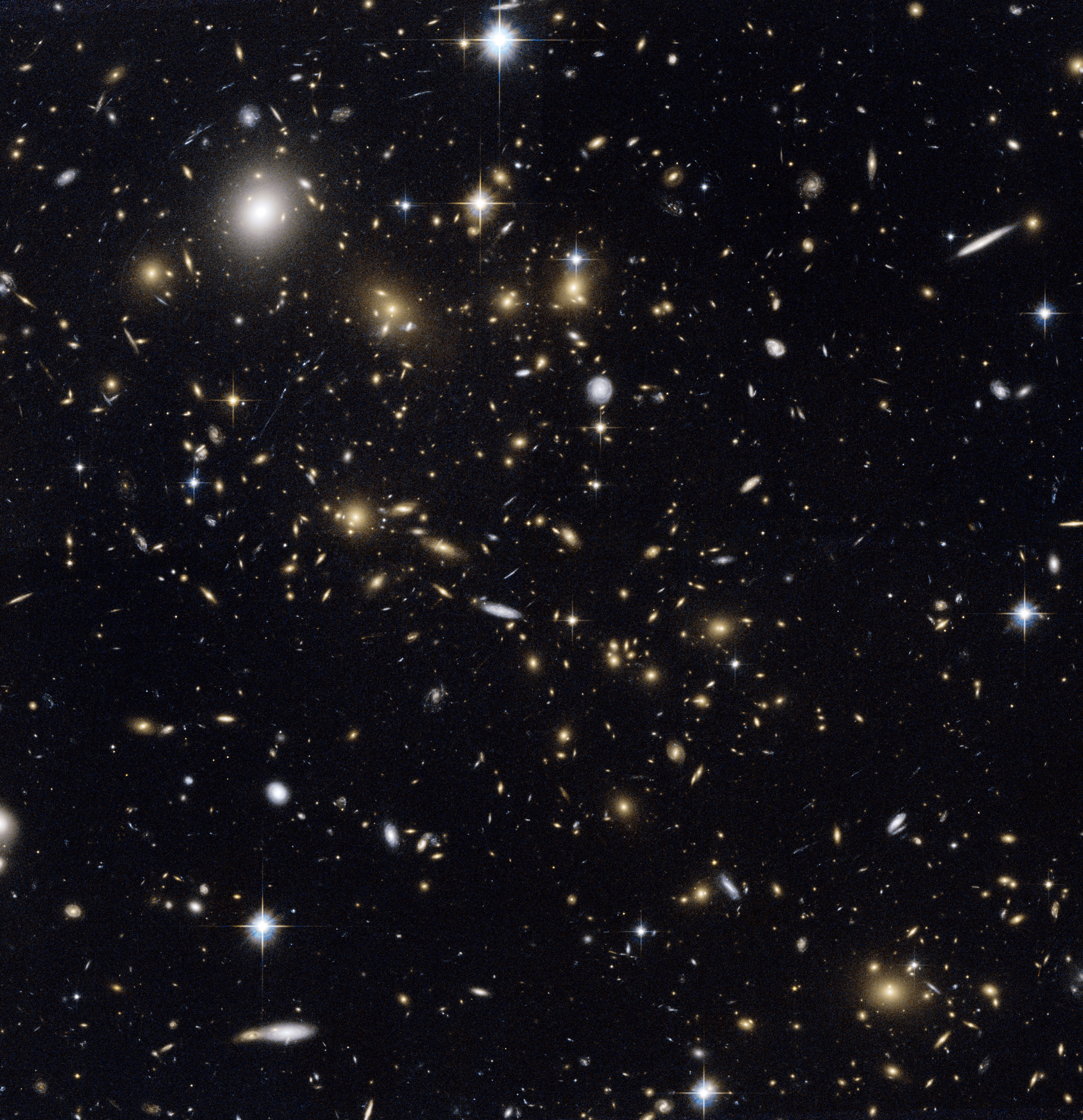
Near-infrared Hubble Space Telescope image of MACS J0717.5+3745.

== See also ==
- Galaxies
- Supercluster
- Sloan Great Wall
- Chandra X-ray Observatory
