= List of voids =

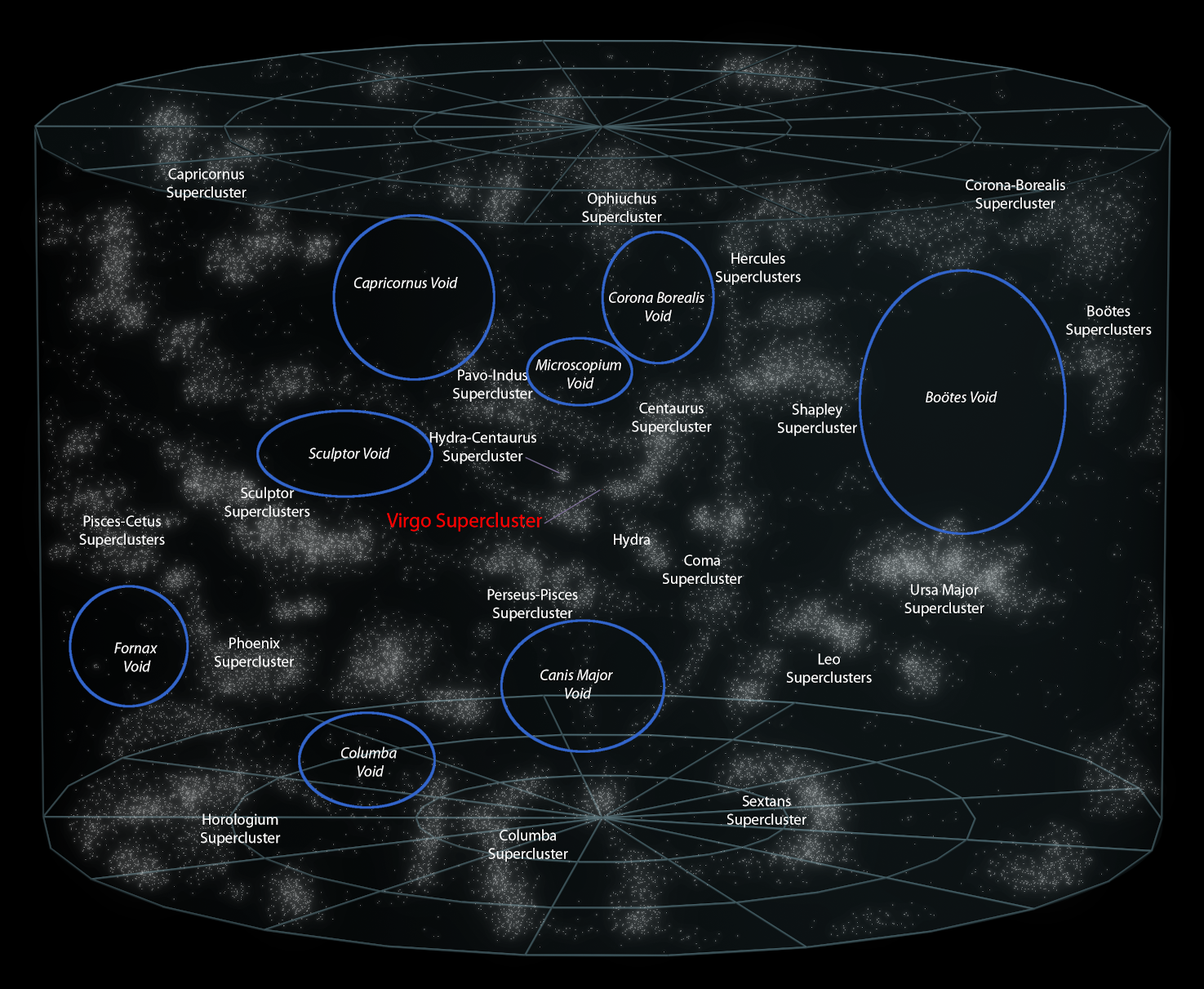
A map of galaxy voids

This is a list of voids in astronomy. Voids are particularly galaxy-poor regions of space between filaments, making up the large-scale structure of the universe. Some voids are known as supervoids.

In the tables, z is the cosmological redshift, c the speed of light, and h the dimensionless Hubble parameter, which has a value of approximately 0.7 (the Hubble constant H_{0} = h × 100 km s^{−1} Mpc^{−1}). Mpc stands for megaparsec.

The co-ordinates (right ascension and declination) and distance given refer to the approximate center of the region.

== Voids and supervoids ==
=== Named voids ===
Name	Coordinates	Distance	Diameter	Data	Notes
Local Void	18^{h} 38^{m} +18°	cz=2500 km/s	60 Mpc		
Northern Local Supervoid		61 Mpc	104 Mpc		Virgo Supercluster, Coma Supercluster, Perseus–Pisces Supercluster, Ursa Major–Lynx Supercluster, Hydra–Centaurus Supercluster, Sculptor Supercluster, Pavo–Corona Australes Supercluster form a sheet between the Northern Local Supervoid and the Southern Local Supervoid. The Hercules Supercluster separates the Northern Local Void from the Boötes Void. The Perseus–Pisces Supercluster and Pegasus Supercluster form a sheet separating the Northern Local Void and Southern Local Void from the Pegasus Void.
Southern Local Supervoid		96 Mpc	112 Mpc		
Giant Void	13^{h} 01^{m} +38.7°	z=0.116	300–400 Mpc		"Giant Void in NGH" or "AR-Lp 36"; NGH stands for "Northern Galactic Hemisphere"; discovered in 1988. It is the largest void in the NGH where z<0.14.
KBC Void			600 Mpc		Void containing the Milky Way and Local Group

=== Voids designated by their constellation ===
Name	Coordinates	Distance	Diameter	Data	Notes
Boötes Void (Great Void)	14^{h} 20^{m} 26°	150 Mpc	100 Mpc		The Hercules Supercluster separates the Northern Local Void from the Boötes Void. The Hercules Supercluster thus forms part of the near edge of the Boötes Void.
Canis Major Void					
Columba Void					
Coma Void					Discovered in 1975, along with the Coma Supercluster, it lies in front of the Coma Cluster. It was the first void to be discovered and is approximately 1/3 as far away as the much larger Boötes Void.
Corona Borealis Void					
Eridanus Void					This void is separated from the Sculptor void by a sheet of galaxies.
Eridanus Supervoid (Great Void)	03^{h} 15^{m} 05^{s} −19° 35′ 02″	z=1	150 Mpc		The claimed Eridanus Supervoid or "Great Void", reported on 24 August 2007 by the NRAO from Very Large Array Sky Survey data. This void, if real, would be much larger than the others listed here (except the Giant Void), about 300 h^{−1} Mpc in diameter and 1800–3000 h^{−1} Mpc distant (where h is the dimensionless Hubble parameter). It would be associated with (and be the explanation of) a cold spot in the cosmic microwave background at the sky location. The evidence for such a "Great Void" is disputed by Smith and Huterer. They showed that the claims made of observational evidence for such a void from survey data neglected systematic effects and did not account for a posteriori choices made in analyzing data.
Southern Eridanus Void					The Southern Eridanus void is connected to the Eridanus void by a hole in the distribution of galaxies separating the two. A hole in the distribution of galaxies separating Sculptor and Southern Eridanus voids the size of (redshift) 1250 km/s appears to exist.
Fornax Void					
Hercules Void	15.5^{h} +30°	cz=7000 km/s			Discovered in 1979
Hydra Void					The Hydra Void lies beyond the Hydra–Centaurus Supercluster
Leo Void	11^{h} 30^{m} 0°	cz=4000 km/s			
Microscopium Void					A hole in the distribution of galaxies separating Sculptor and Microscopium voids the size of (redshift) 1250 km/s appears to exist. This is roughly 1/2 of Microscopium's diameter.
Ophiuchus Void	near 17^{h} −25°	< 5000 km/s (the outer limit)			25% of average universe density is the void density of matter. The far end of this void is defined by the Ophiuchus Supercluster.
Pegasus Void	22^{h} +15°	cz=5500 km/s	40 Mpc		The Perseus–Pisces Supercluster and Pegasus Supercluster form a sheet separate the Northern Local Void and Southern Local Void from the Pegasus Void.
Perseus–Pisces Void	1^{h} +10°	cz=8000 km/s			Discovered in 1980, it is also called the Perseus Void
Sagittarius Void					
Sculptor Void	23^{h} 48^{m} −24° 39′		34.8 Mpc/h		Corresponds to SRSS1 Void 3 and SRSS2 Void 5 This void is separated from the Eridanus Void by a sheet of galaxies. A hole in the distribution of galaxies separating Sculptor and Southern Eridanus Voids the size of 1250 km/s appears to exist. The Sculptor Void lies next to the Southern Wall or Southern Great Wall.
Taurus Void			30 Mpc		The Taurus Void appears large and circular, and has walls of galaxies surrounding it. It lies next to the Perseus–Pisces Supercluster, and is the most visually identifiable. Several galaxies have been found to reside in the void, such as UGC 2627 and UGC 2629, both approximately 185 million light years away.

=== Other voids ===
Designation	Location	Coordinates	Distance	Diameter	Dimensions	Notes
Bahcall & Soneira 1982 void	z = 0.03 – 0.08				150 h^{−1} Mpc deep; 300 h^{−1} Mpc wide; 60 h^{−1} Mpc tall	This suspected void ranged 100 degrees across the sky, and has shown up on other surveys as several separate voids.

== Voids by search or survey ==
=== Tully list ===
In 1985, Tully determined a local dominant supercluster plane, and found the Pisces–Cetus Supercluster Complex.

#	Coordinates	Distance	Diameter	Notes
#	Coordinates	(h^{−1} Mpc)		Notes
1	17.0^{h} 80°	90	140	
2	21.0^{h} −7°	100	136	
3	8.6^{h} +13°	150	150	
4	21.5^{h} +5°	170	173	
5	14.3^{h} +52°	180	158	Boötes Void
6	23.0^{h} −16°	190	171	
7	12.8^{h} +14°	190	174	
8	10.0^{h} +35°	250	170	
9	2.6^{h} −11°	280	229	
10	8.7^{h} +58°	310	243	
11	16.8^{h} +5°	310	270	

=== B&B Abell-derived list ===
In a 1985 study of Abell clusters, 29 voids were determined, in the sphere z<0.1 around Earth.

#	Coordinates	Distance	Diameter	Notes
#	Coordinates	(h^{−1} Mpc)		Notes
1	0.0^{h} +20°	293	100	
2	0.3^{h} 0°	276	100	
3	0.7^{h} +10°	284	100	
4	2.0^{h} −13°	275	150	
5	8.0^{h} +60°	300	100	
6	9.0^{h} +18°	220	100	
7	9.0^{h} +67°	180	120	
8	9.2^{h} +26°	137	140	
9	9.5^{h} +45°	262	200	
10	9.8^{h} 0°	285	110	
11	9.8^{h} +35°	219	110	
12	10.8^{h} −10°	293	120	
13	12.0^{h} +14°	206	110	
14	12.3^{h} 0°	276	100	
15	12.4^{h} −12°	272	150	
16	12.5^{h} +32°	237	100	
17	12.9^{h} +64°	105	110	
18	13.6^{h} +35°	154	200	Boötes Void
19	13.8^{h} +20°	297	110	
20	14.2^{h} −4°	265	210	
21	14.7^{h} +70°	283	160	
22	15.2^{h} +42°	286	140	
23	16.0^{h} +7°	295	110	
24	16.4^{h} +41°	291	130	
25	16.5^{h} +59°	110	100	
26	17.2^{h} +58°	237	100	
27	22.2^{h} −2°	155	130	
28	22.5^{h} 5°	284	160	
29	23.5^{h} −7°	203	120	

=== SSRS1 list ===
A redshift survey of galaxies in the southern sky in 1988, out to a distance of 120 Mpc/h, revealed some voids.

#	Coordinates	Distance (V)	Dimensions W × H × D (h^{−1} Mpc)	Constellation	Notes
1	1.5^{h} −50°	3000 km/s	30 × 30 × 40	Phoenix/Eridanus	Located just behind the galaxy concentration in Eridanus-Fornax-Dorado
2	21^{h} −25°	5000 km/s	30 × 30 × 30	Capricornus/Microscopium	
3	23.5^{h} −35°	6000 km/s	70 × 30 × 50	Sculptor/Grus	
4	4^{h} −40°	9000 km/s	50 × 100 × 50	Horologium/Eridanus	

=== SSRS2 list ===
In 1994, a redshift survey in the southern sky identified 18 voids, 11 of which are major voids.

#	Coordinates	Distance (r)	Diameter (h^{−1} Mpc)	Constellation	Notes
1	1^{h} 33^{m} −16° 45′	85.7	54.3	Cetus	major void
2	3^{h} 34^{m} −28° 50′	99.7	56.2	Fornax	major void SRSS1 Void 4
3	22^{h} 25^{m} −14° 46′	107.2	60.8	Aquarius	major void
4	21^{h} 43^{m} −14° 40′	66.7	35.6	Capricornus	major void
5	23^{h} 48^{m} −24° 39′	53.0	34.8	Aquarius/Sculptor	major void SRSS1 Void 3 (Sculptor Void)
6	3^{h} 56^{m} −20° 11′	56.5	32.0	Eridanus	major void
7	3^{h} 17^{m} −11° 40′	77.2	25.5	Eridanus	major void
8	23^{h} 20^{m} −12° 32′	83.9	27.8	Aquarius	major void
9	3^{h} 06^{m} −13° 47′	114.6	39.0	Eridanus	major void
10	0^{h} 26^{m} −9° 17′	104.7	34.8	Cetus	major void
11	0^{h} 21^{m} −29° 43′	112.8	42.9	Sculptor	major void
12	23^{h} 03^{m} −32° 35′	74.8	25.0	Piscis Austrinus/Sculptor	
13	1^{h} 23^{m} −19° 36′	31.0	22.1	Cetus	SRSS1 Void 1
14	21^{h} 28^{m} −29° 28′	87.2	21.3	Piscis Austrinus/Microscopium	
15	21^{h} 24^{m} −33° 17′	116.1	27.3	Microscopium	
16	21^{h} 43^{m} −18° 41′	36.5	20.3	Capricornus	
17	3^{h} 42^{m} −21° 21′	32.1	19.0	Eridanus	
18	4^{h} 18^{m} −8° 42′	85.9	21.1	Eridanus	

=== 1994 EEDTA Whole Sky Survey ===
A 1994 census lists a total of 27 supervoids within a cube of 740 Mpc a side, centered on us (z=0.1 distant sphere).

#	Coordinates (B1950.0)	Distance (Mpc/h)	Diameter (Mpc/h) (Note: This is the diameter of the largest sphere one can describe inside the void that contains no superclusters. Some voids have an elongated shape, so this diameter may underrepresent the size of some voids.)	Notes
1	19.0° −57.1°	134	88	
2	28.2° −12.3°	207	96	
3	34.8° −61.9°	216	72	
4	36.6° −33.5°	241	86	
5	37.8° −36.1°	129	92	
6	46.0° −21.4°	236	72	
7	62.0° −8.0°	248	100	
8	71.2° −38.3°	201	76	
9	121.7° −1.5°	96	112	Southern Local Supervoid
10	130.0° +49.3°	246	144	
11	140.4° +10.5°	160	92	
12	146.9° +27.4°	227	106	
13	153.1° −11.4°	246	94	
14	159.9° +1.2°	167	68	
15	161.6° −32.2°	241	98	
16	167.4° +22.8°	222	74	
17	186.9° −15.6°	216	94	
18	196.8° +9.5°	119	102	
19	204.8° +35.7°	119	108	
20	214.6° +13.6°	216	78	Boötes Void (Great Void)
21	216.7° +56.5°	143	116	
22	219.8° +57.9°	246	96	
23	220.2° +33.9°	219	72	
24	256.1° −4.8°	61	104	Northern Local Supervoid
25	353.0° −59.4°	198	74	
26	356.6° +22.2°	246	80	
27	358.9° −33.1°	241	70	

=== Galactic Anti-Center IRAS search ===
In a 1995 study of IRAS data looking for large-scale structure in the Galactic Anticenter in the Zone of Avoidance, four voids were discovered.

#	Coordinates (B1950.0)	Distance (km/s)	Dimensions	Notes
V0	5.2^{h} +18°	1000	96°×36°×2000 km/s	
V1	3.5^{h} +18°	3750	15°×36°×3500 km/s	V1 and V2 are connected, and block the Perseus–Pisces Supercluster from traversing the Zone of Avoidance.
V2	3.5^{h} +29°	8000	25°×14°×2000 km/s	V1 and V2 are connected, and block the Perseus–Pisces Supercluster from traversing the Zone of Avoidance.
V3	8.0^{h} +10°	7000	30°×20°×2000 km/s	This void lies in front of the CfA2 Great Wall.

=== IRAS list ===
Analysis of the IRAS redshift survey in 1997 revealed 24 voids, 12 of which were termed "significant"

#	Supergalactic Coordinates (r,X,Y,Z)	Diameter (h^{−1} Mpc)	Data	Notes
1	(55.2,−10.4,−53.8,6.1)	51.0		significant void
2	(49.6,−25.3,31.4,−28.9)	43.8		significant void
3	(46.0,−24.8,26.7,28.1)	44.5		significant void
4	(46.5,8.7,24.7,38.4)	45.0		significant void (Local Void)
5	(32.0,−13.0,−23.9,−16.9)	36.0		significant void
6	(51.5,17.0,−32.2,36.4)	41.4		significant void
7	(57.1,31.2,44.9,16.5)	43.5		significant void
8	(60.4,−25.8,−22.7,−49.7)	39.5		significant void
9	(49.8,35.9,−25.6,−23.0)	36.0		significant void
10	(63.3,−48.0,−40.9,6.0)	33.6		significant void (Sculptor Void)
11	(48.6,11.8,46.6,−6.9)	32.0		significant void
12	(49.9,−15.6,−35.7,31.3)	31.5		significant void
13	(62.8,14.2,29.3,−53.7)	40.3		
14	(19.0,0.7,−16.4,9.6)	28.8		
15	(37.6,32.4,−17.0,8.6)	30.4		Perseus–Pisces Void

== See also ==
- Large scale structure of the universe
- Galaxy filament
- Supercluster
- Galaxy cluster
- Lists of astronomical objects
