= Giant Void =

Region of outer space

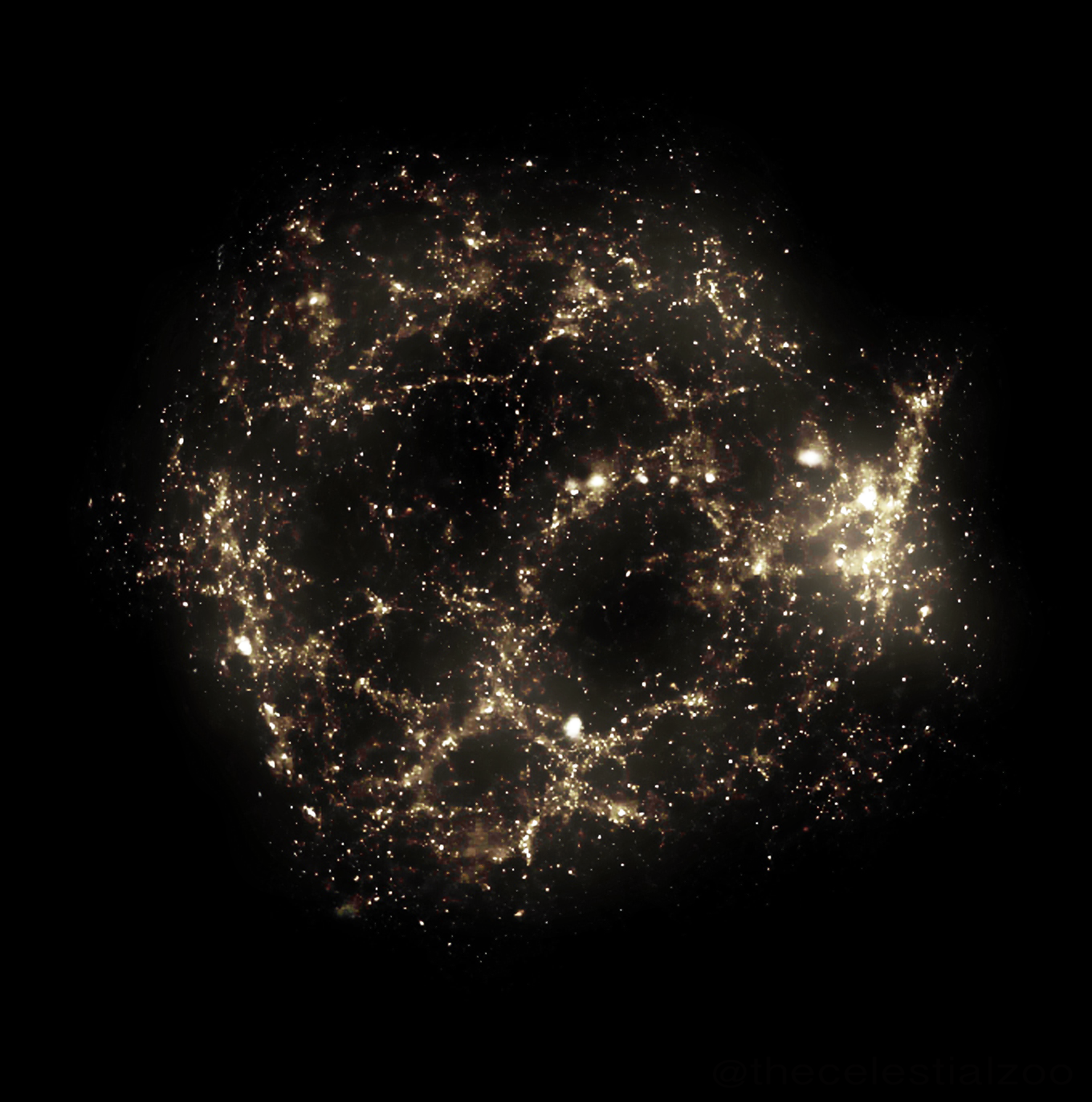
Artist's conception of the Giant Void and the filaments and walls that surround it. The internal clusters can also be appreciated (credit: Pablo Carlos Budassi).

The Giant Void (also known as the Giant Void in NGH, Canes Venatici Supervoid, and AR-Lp 36) is an extremely large region of space with an underdensity of galaxies located in the constellation Canes Venatici. It is the second-largest confirmed void to date, with an estimated diameter of 300 to 400 Mpc (1 to 1.3 billion light-years). Its centre is approximately 460 Mpc (1.5 billion light-years) away (z = 0.116). It was discovered in 1988, and was the largest void in the Northern Galactic Hemisphere (NGH), and possibly the second-largest ever detected. Even the hypothesized "Eridanus Supervoid" corresponding to the location of the WMAP cold spot is dwarfed by this void, although the Giant Void does not correspond to any significant cooling to the cosmic microwave background.

Inside the Giant Void there are 17 galaxy clusters, concentrated in a spherically shaped region 50 Mpc in diameter. Studies of the motion of these clusters show that they have no interaction to each other, meaning the density of the clusters is very low and results in weak gravitational interaction. The void's location in the sky is close to the Boötes Void.

In a series of papers published between 2004 and 2006, cosmologist and theoretical physicist Laura Mersini-Houghton presented a theory that the universe arose from a multiverse, and made a series of testable predictions which included the existence of the Giant Void.

== See also ==
- KBC Void
- Large-scale structure of the cosmos
- List of largest voids
- Local Void
- Microscopium Void
- Northern Local Supervoid
- South Pole Wall
- Southern Local Supervoid
- Void (astronomy)
