= Great void =

Great Void can refer to:

Astronomy

- A "super void", large empty regions of spaces

- Boötes Void, a supervoid in the constellation Boötes
- Giant Void, a supervoid in the constellation Canes Venatici
- CMB cold spot, a supervoid in the constellation Eridanus

- Outer space in general

Other

- At the Edge of the Great Void, the nineteenth volume of the Valérian and Laureline series
- A region in the Crystalicum RPG card game
- "Eoarchaean: The Great Void", a song by The Ocean Collective, from the album Precambrian
- Greetings from the Great Void, an album from the Italian duo My Cat Is an Alien
- Purgatory in the after-life
