= Hubble bubble (astronomy) =

Variation in the Hubble constant

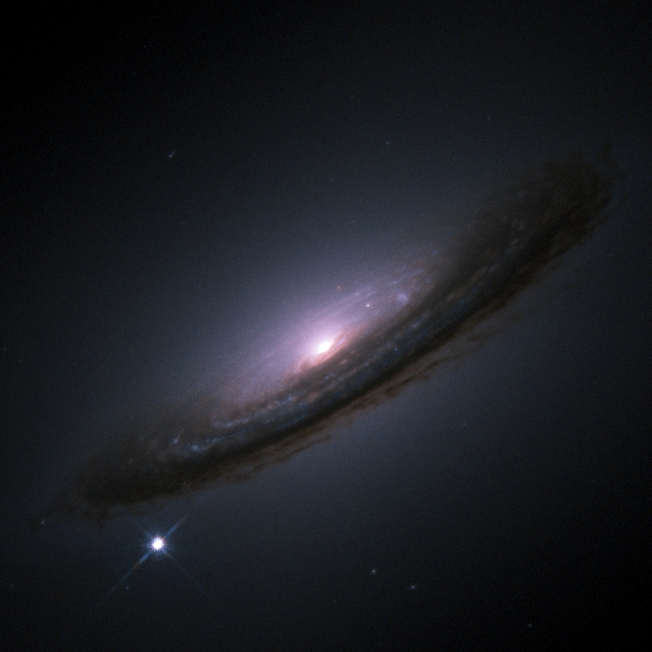
The Hubble Space Telescope reveals many local anomalies in the generally homogeneous character of interstellar space, such as this galaxy (NGC 4526) and the supernova beside it (SN 1994D).

In astronomy, a Hubble bubble would be "a departure of the local value of the Hubble constant from its globally averaged value", or, more technically, "a local monopole in the peculiar velocity field, perhaps caused by a local void in the mass density".

The Hubble constant, named for astronomer Edwin Hubble, whose work made clear the expansion of the universe, measures the rate at which expansion occurs. In accordance with the Copernican principle that the Earth is not in a central, specially favored position, one would expect that measuring this constant at any point in the universe would yield the same value. If, on the other hand, Earth were at or near the center of a very low-density region of interstellar space (a relative void), the local expansion would be faster due to the lack of nearby mass to slow it down. Thus, stars inside such a "Hubble bubble" would accelerate away from Earth faster than the general expansion of the universe. This situation could provide an alternative to dark energy in explaining the apparent accelerating universe or contribute to explanations of the Hubble tension.

== Hubble bubble proposed ==
In 1998, Zehavi et al. reported evidence in support of a Hubble bubble. The initial suggestion that local redshift velocities differ from those seen elsewhere in the universe was based on observations of Type Ia supernovae, often abbreviated "SNe Ia". Such stars have been used as standard candle distance markers, and were key to the first observations of dark energy.

Zehavi et al. studied the peculiar velocities of 44 SNe Ia to test for a local void, and reported that Earth seemed to be inside a relative void of roughly 20% underdensity, surrounded by a dense shell, a "bubble."

== Testing the hypothesis ==
In 2007, Conley et al. examined the SNe Ia color data comparisons while taking into account the effect of cosmic dust in external galaxies. They concluded that the data did not support the existence of a local Hubble bubble.

In 2010, Moss et al. analyzed the Hubble Bubble model although without using that name, saying "The suggestion that we occupy a privileged position near the center of a large, nonlinear, and nearly spherical void has recently attracted much attention as an alternative to dark energy." Looking not only at supernova data but also at the cosmic microwave background spectrum, Big Bang nucleosynthesis and other factors, they concluded that "voids are in severe tension with the data. In particular, void models predict a very low local Hubble rate, suffer from an 'old age problem', and predict much less local structure than is observed."

Local void models propose a large area of lower than average density, so they ordinarily make or imply stochastic predictions that can be falsified by astronomical surveys. For example, under a local void model, an unusually low number of nearby galaxies would be expected, so observations indicating an average number of nearby galaxies would constitute disconfirming evidence. Data from an infrared survey released in 2003, the Two Micron All Sky Survey, is suggested to accord with a local underdensity of approximately 200 megaparsecs (Mpc) in diameter. This hypothesis has received additional support from further studies of photometric and spectroscopic galaxy surveys. Furthermore, larger voids (KBC Void) out to 600 Mpc scale have been proposed on the basis of studies of galaxy luminosity density.

== Relationship to Hubble tension ==
Measurements of the Hubble constant vary, with recent figures typically ranging from approximately 64 to 82 (km/s)/Mpc – a difference considered too significant to be explained by chance and too persistent to be explained by error. Measurements of the cosmic microwave background tend to result in lower values than measurements by other means, such as photometry and cosmic distance ladder. For example, cosmic background radiation data from the Atacama Cosmology Telescope implies that the universe should be expanding more slowly than is locally observed. In 2013, luminosity density measurements were made of galaxies from a broad sample of spectroscopic surveys. The resulting statistical analysis implies that the local mass density may be lower than the universe's average mass density. The scale and amplitude of this underdensity could resolve the apparent discrepancy between direct local measurements of the Hubble constant and values calculated from Planck's measurements of the cosmic microwave background.

== See also ==
- KBC Void
- Local Void
- Giant Void
- Large-scale structure of the cosmos
- Void (astronomy)
- List of largest voids
