= Taurus Void =

Intergalactic void between the Perseus–Pisces and Virgo superclusters

Observation Data
- (Epoch J2000)
- Right Ascension: 3^{h}30^{min}
- Declination: +20°
- Galactic Longitude: 167°
- Galactic Latitude: −29°
- Apparent Radial Velocity: 4,000 km/s (2,500 mi/s)
- Radius: ~2,000 km/s (1,200 mi/s)

The Taurus Void is a vast, near-empty region of space situated between the Perseus–Pisces Supercluster and the Virgo Supercluster. The Taurus Void is unique because of its relatively close proximity to Earth, and because it helps to define the edge of latter's home supercluster, the Virgo Supercluster. Despite its close proximity to Earth, the Taurus Void is not well-studied because it is partially obscured by the Milky Way when viewed from Earth. In contrast to its ambiguous boundary in the section of sky obscured by the Milky Way, the Taurus Void has a very well-defined boundary with the Perseus–Pisces Supercluster. It is approximately 100mly in diameter.

== Location ==
In Earth's sky, the Taurus Void appears from ~2^{h}40^{min} to at least 4^{h} ra, at which point it is obscured by the Milky Way, and from 5° to 40° dec. Opposite its border with the Milky Way, the Taurus Void forms a distinct border with the Perseus–Pisces Supercluster. Specifically, the void is bordered by the galaxy clusters A400, A426, and A374 within the supercluster.

In 3D space, the Taurus Void resides between the Perseus–Pisces Supercluster and the Virgo Supercluster. By situating itself between these two superclusters, the Taurus Void, along with the Local Void, define the boundary between these two superclusters (and to some extent the Laniakea Supercluster, because the Virgo Supercluster is technically a part of the much larger Laniakea Supercluster).

== Zone of Avoidance ==
Despite its close proximity to Earth, the Taurus Void is a difficult void to study because it lies behind the Zone of Avoidance (ZOA) – the area of sky obscured by the Milky Way. The Taurus Void lies behind an area of high extinction.

Because much of the Taurus Void lies behind an area of high extinction, scientists face a challenge when trying to determine the density and dimensions of the Taurus Void. The main problem is that light from dimmer galaxies lying behind the Milky Way may be extinguished before it reaches Earth, preventing scientists from observing these galaxies. This would lead scientists to believe that the Taurus Void is emptier than it actually is, because they can not observe the galaxies that may be present.

This is not to say that the Taurus Void is not an actual void, however. The void has previously been observed in the infrared spectrum (where there is less foreground extinction from the Milky Way) to establish that the void is indeed a void. Additionally, there have been other studies that have mapped the void and others that have determined the rate of galaxy outflow from the void to other superclusters. Together, these studies provide strong evidence that a void does exist, despite the difficulty of observing objects behind the ZOA.

Further efforts to see behind the Milky Way's ZOA such as the ALFAZOA and ALFALFA surveys may be able to perform more accurate measurements and place better constraints on the parameters of the void in the future. The surveys, conducted using the Arecibo radio telescope, will attempt to look for light from distant galaxies that has been redshifted to a wavelength that will stand out in comparison to the noise caused by the Milky Way's Zone of Avoidance. However, these surveys have limited range in the north-south (declination) direction, due to operation constraints of the Arecibo telescope.

== See also ==
- Large-scale structure of the universe
- List of voids
