= NGC 6085 =

Galaxy in the constellation Corona Borealis

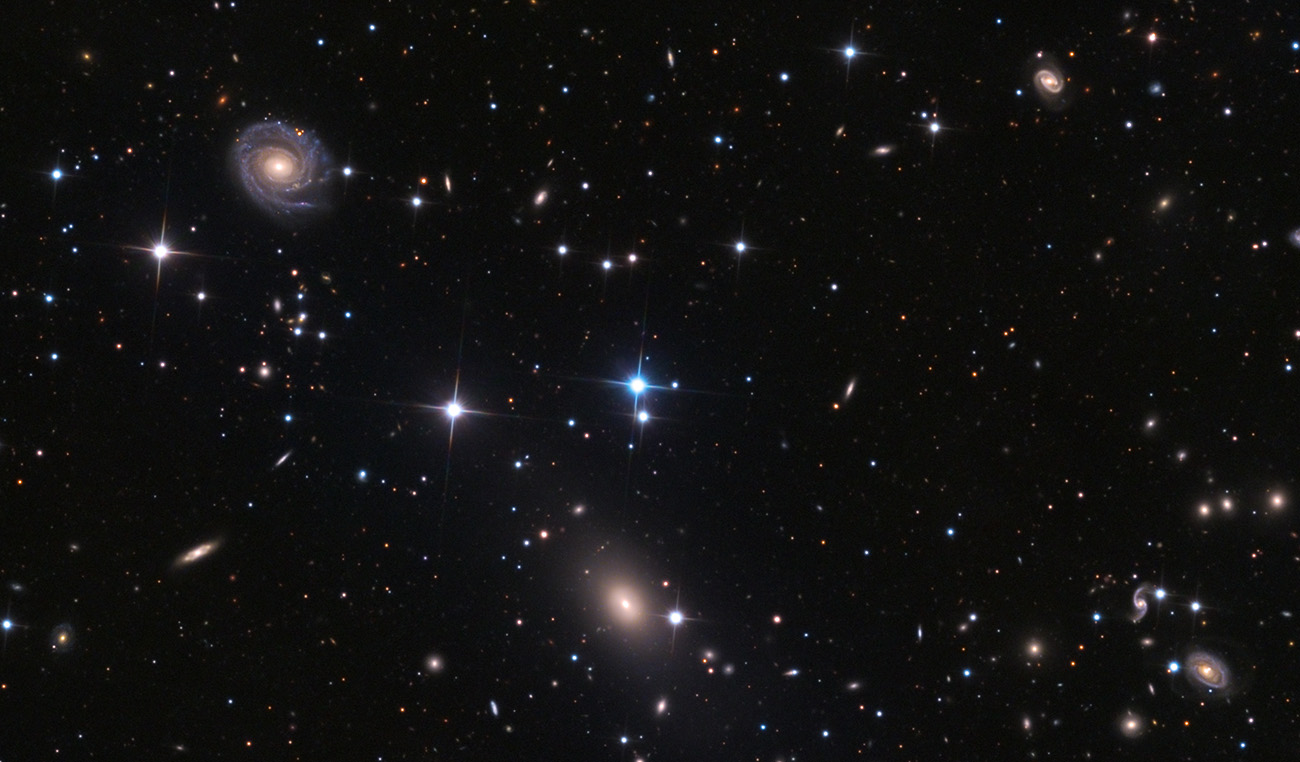
- NGC 6085 (above, left) and NGC 6086 (below, center); Credit: Adam Block/Mount Lemmon SkyCenter/University of Arizona

Observation data (J2000 epoch)
- Constellation: Corona Borealis
- Right ascension: 16^{h} 12^{m} 35.237^{s}
- Declination: +29° 21′ 53.68″
- Redshift: 0.034007
- Heliocentric radial velocity: 10,195 km/s
- Distance: 454.99 ± 13.71 Mly (139.5 ± 4.203 Mpc)
- Group or cluster: Abell 2162
- Apparent magnitude (B): 14.5

Characteristics
- Type: Sa
- Size: 225,000 ly (68.77 kpc) (estimated)
- Apparent size (V): 1.49′ × 1.04′

Other designations
- UGC 10269, MGC+05-38-034, PGC 57486

NGC 6085 is a spiral galaxy in the constellation of Corona Borealis. It has a diameter of about 225,000 light years. It is also classified as a LINER galaxy and is a member of Abell 2162.
