= NGC 7077 =

Dwarf galaxy in the constellation Aquarius

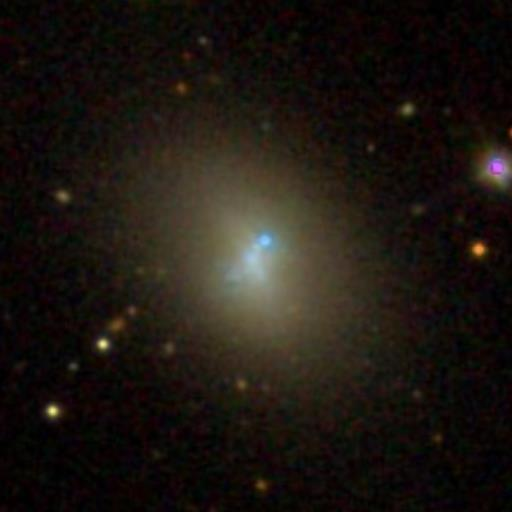
- The lenticular galaxy NGC 7077 as imaged by the Sloan Digital Sky Survey.

Observation data (J2000 epoch)
- Constellation: Aquarius
- Right ascension: 21^{h} 29^{m} 59.6^{s}
- Declination: 02° 24′ 51″
- Redshift: 0.003843
- Heliocentric radial velocity: 1152 km/s
- Distance: 56 Mly (17.2 Mpc)
- Apparent magnitude (V): 14.14

Characteristics
- Type: S0- pec?, BCD
- Size: ~12,300 ly (3.78 kpc) (estimated)
- Apparent size (V): 0.8 x 0.7

Other designations
- ARAK 549, CGCG 375-47, MCG 0-54-28, Mrk 900, NPM1G +02.0497, PGC 66860, UGC 11755

NGC 7077 is a lenticular blue compact dwarf galaxy located about 56 million light-years away from Earth in the constellation Aquarius. Discovered by astronomer Albert Marth on August 11, 1863, the galaxy lies within the Local Void.

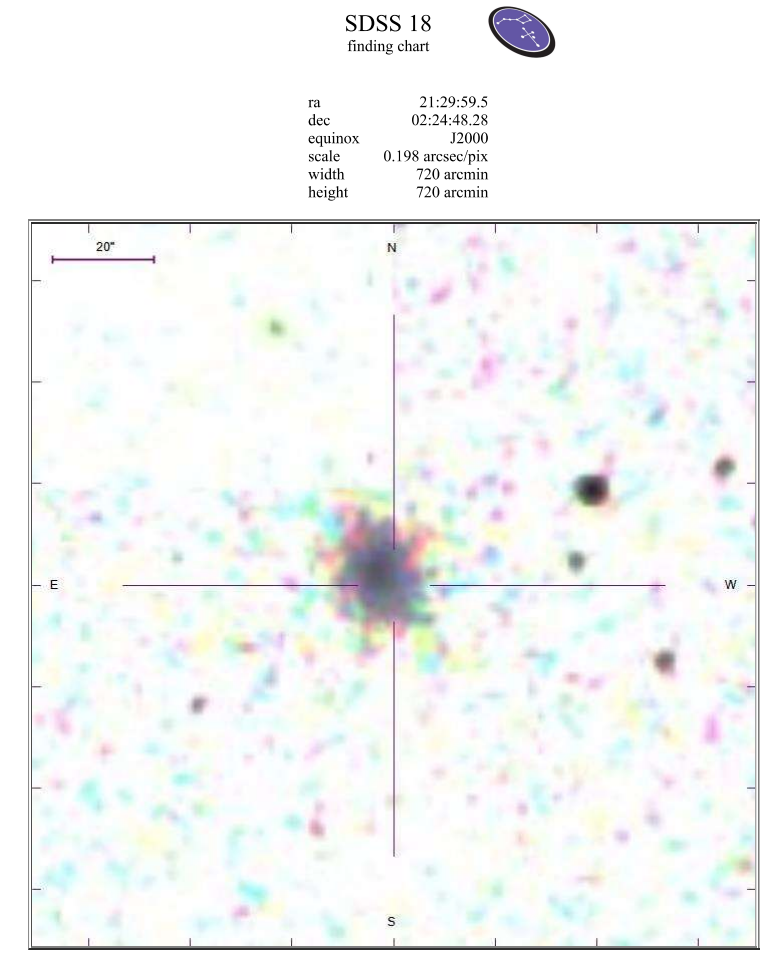
Infrared image of the NGC 7077 galaxy

== See also ==
- List of NGC objects (7001–7840)
