= Northern Local Supervoid =

Supervoid located between the Virgo, Coma and Hercules superclusters

The Northern Local Supervoid is a region of space devoid of rich clusters of galaxies, known as a void. It is the closest supervoid and is located between the Virgo (Local), Coma and Hercules superclusters. On the sky, it is located between the constellations Boötes, Virgo, and Serpens Caput. It contains a few small galaxies (primarily spirals) and galaxy clusters, but is mostly empty. The faint galaxies within this void divide the region into smaller voids, which are 3–10 times smaller than the supervoid. The center is located 61 Mpc (199 Mly) away at approximately (15^{h} , +15°) and it is 104 Mpc (339 Mly) in diameter across its narrowest width.

== See also ==
- KBC Void
- Boötes Void
