= NGC 6503 =

Spiral galaxy in the constellation Draco

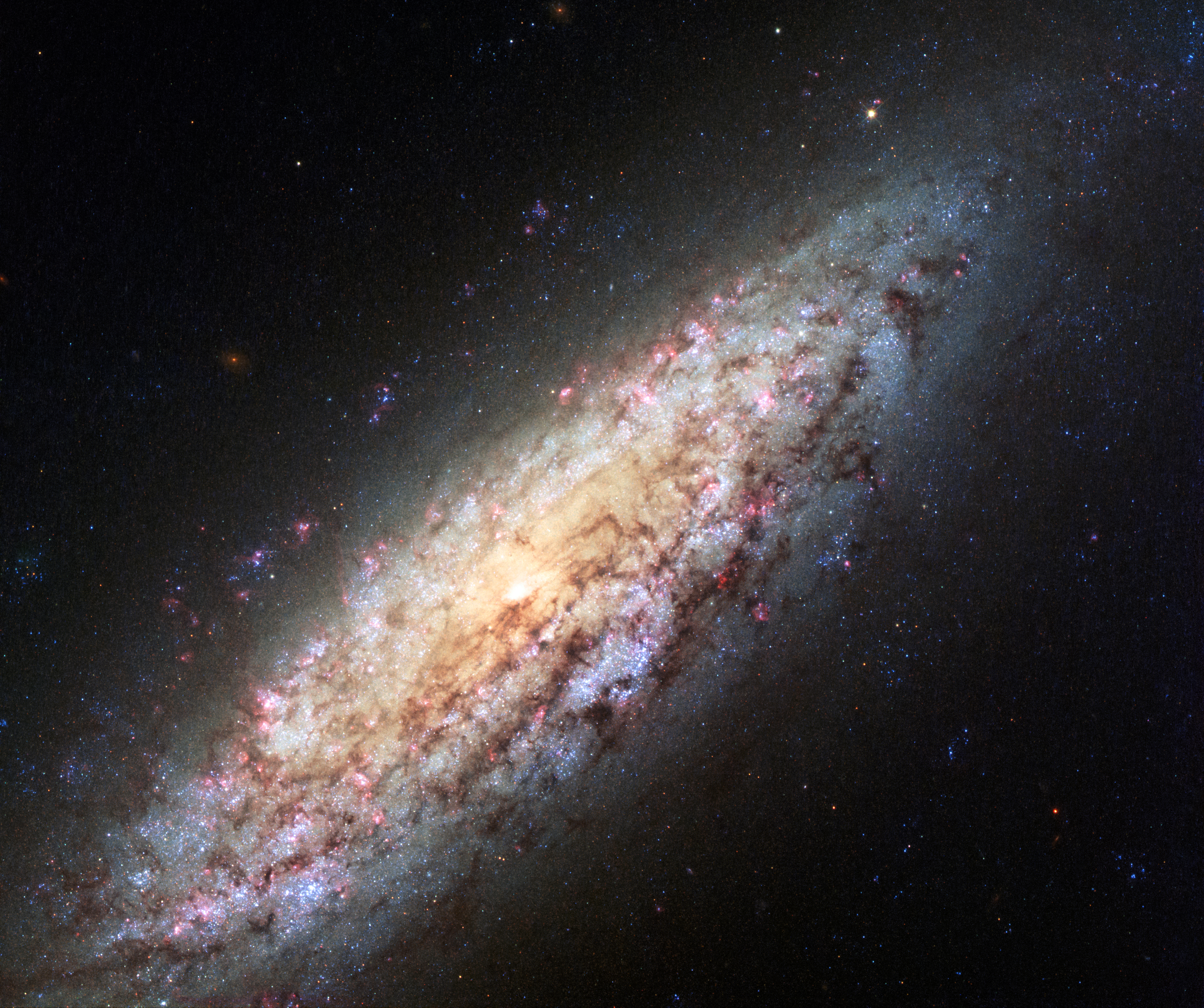
- HST image of NGC 6503's spiral arms

Observation data (J2000 epoch)
- Constellation: Draco
- Right ascension: 17^{h} 49^{m} 26.4207^{s}
- Declination: +70° 08′ 39.587″
- Redshift: 0.000143
- Heliocentric radial velocity: 28 km/s
- Distance: 20.9 ± 2.2 Mly (6.40 ± 0.66 Mpc)
- Apparent magnitude (V): 10.2

Characteristics
- Type: SAB:(s)bc
- Apparent size (V): 7.1′ × 2.4′

Other designations
- IRAS 17499+7009, 2MASX J17492651+7008396, UGC 11012, LEDA 60921, MCG +12-17-009

NGC 6503, also known as the Lost-In-Space Galaxy, is a field dwarf spiral galaxy in the northern constellation of Draco. It was discovered by German astronomer Arthur von Auwers on July 22, 1854. The galaxy has an angular size of 7.1′ × 2.4′ and an apparent visual magnitude of 10.2. It is located at the distance of 18 million light years away from the Milky Way galaxy. NGC 6503 may form the remote tip of a long chain of galaxies that extends out into the Local Void, forming a galaxy filament spanning 26 million light-years (8 Mpc).

The galactic plane of this galaxy is inclined at an angle of 78°±3° to the plane of the sky, with the major axis of its oval profile being aligned along a position angle of 121°. The morphological classification of NGC 6503 is SAB:(s)bc. This indicates a barred spiral galaxy (SAB:) with no inner ring structure (s) and moderately wound spiral arms (bc). However, the ':' notation indicates some uncertainty about the classification. Older works gave it a class of SA(s)bc; i.e. no bar.

A possible bar system has been reported via infrared observations, being viewed end-on from the perspective of the Earth. Ultraviolet observations show a young, inner star forming ring encircling the bar. The ring has a radius between 1 and 2.5 kpc from the core. There is a disk of neutral hydrogen that is larger in extent than the optical disk of the galaxy. This extra-planar gas is mostly the result of star formation activity, rather than cold gas that is being accreted. There is evidence for a LINER-type or Seyfert 2 nucleus.

NGC 6503 has one known satellite galaxy, known as KK 242. With a stellar mass of about 3 million solar masses, KK 242 is on the border between a dwarf irregular galaxy (dIrr) and a dwarf spheroidal galaxy (dSph).

== Gallery ==
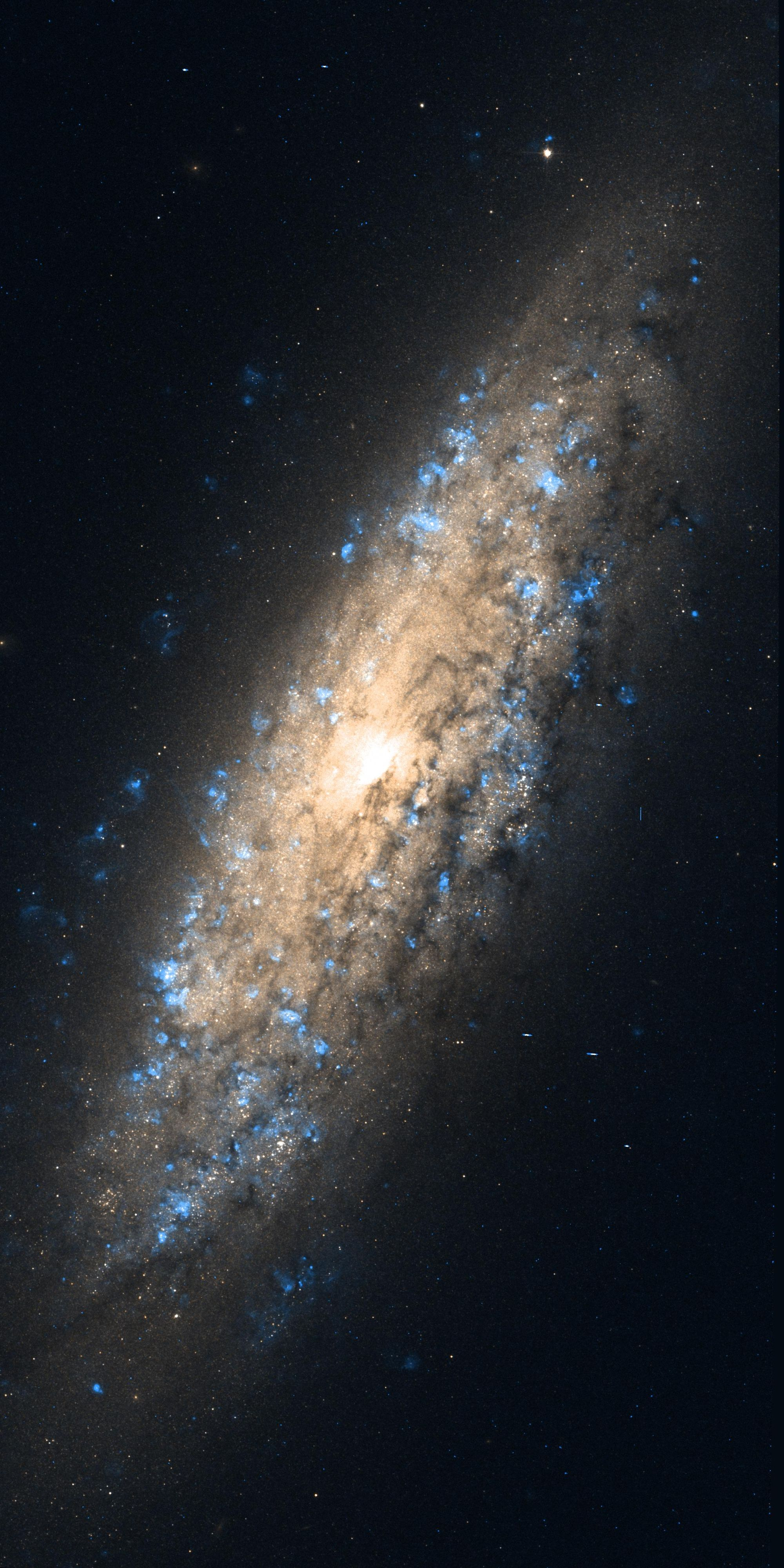
NGC 6503 by Hubble Space Telescope

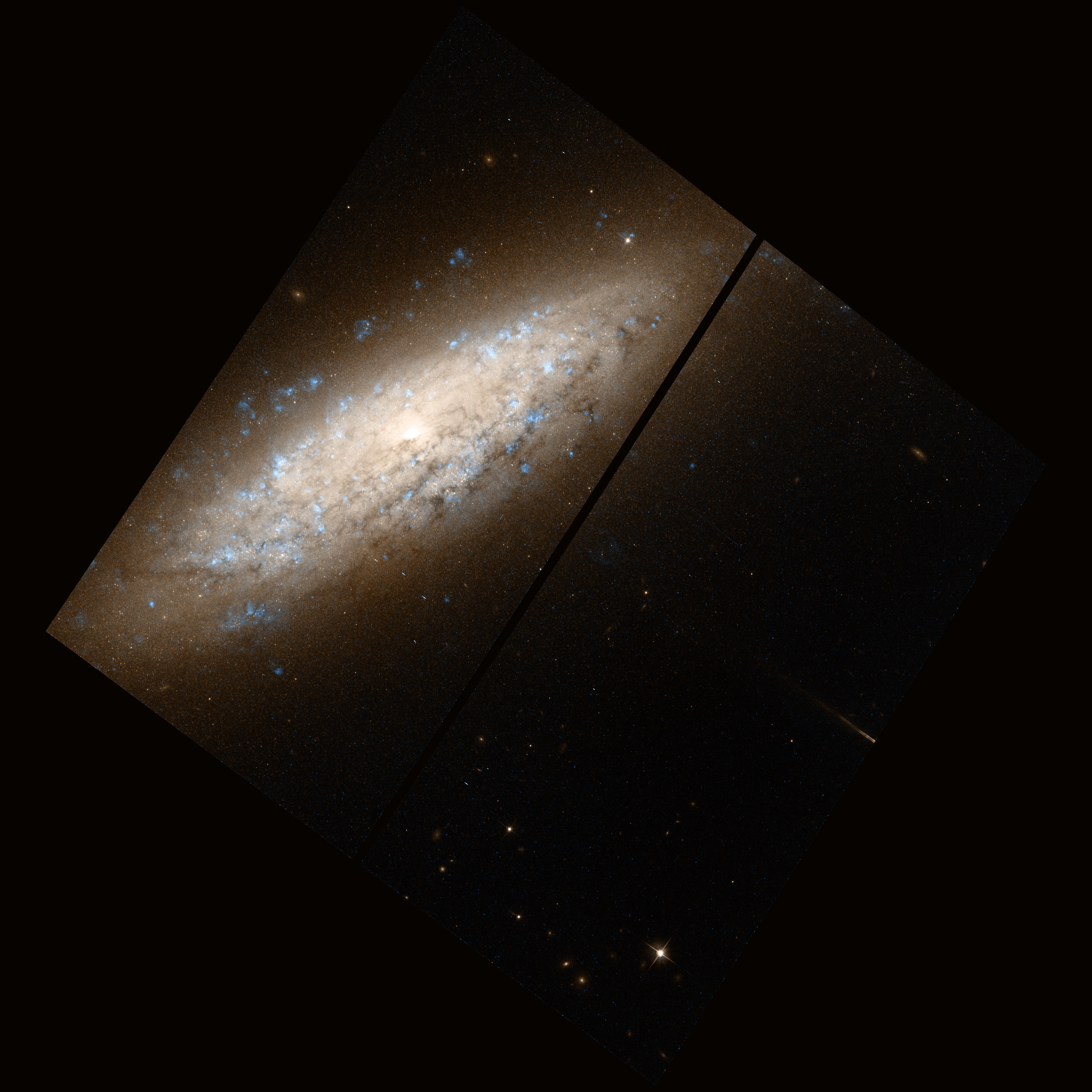
NGC 6503 (HST)

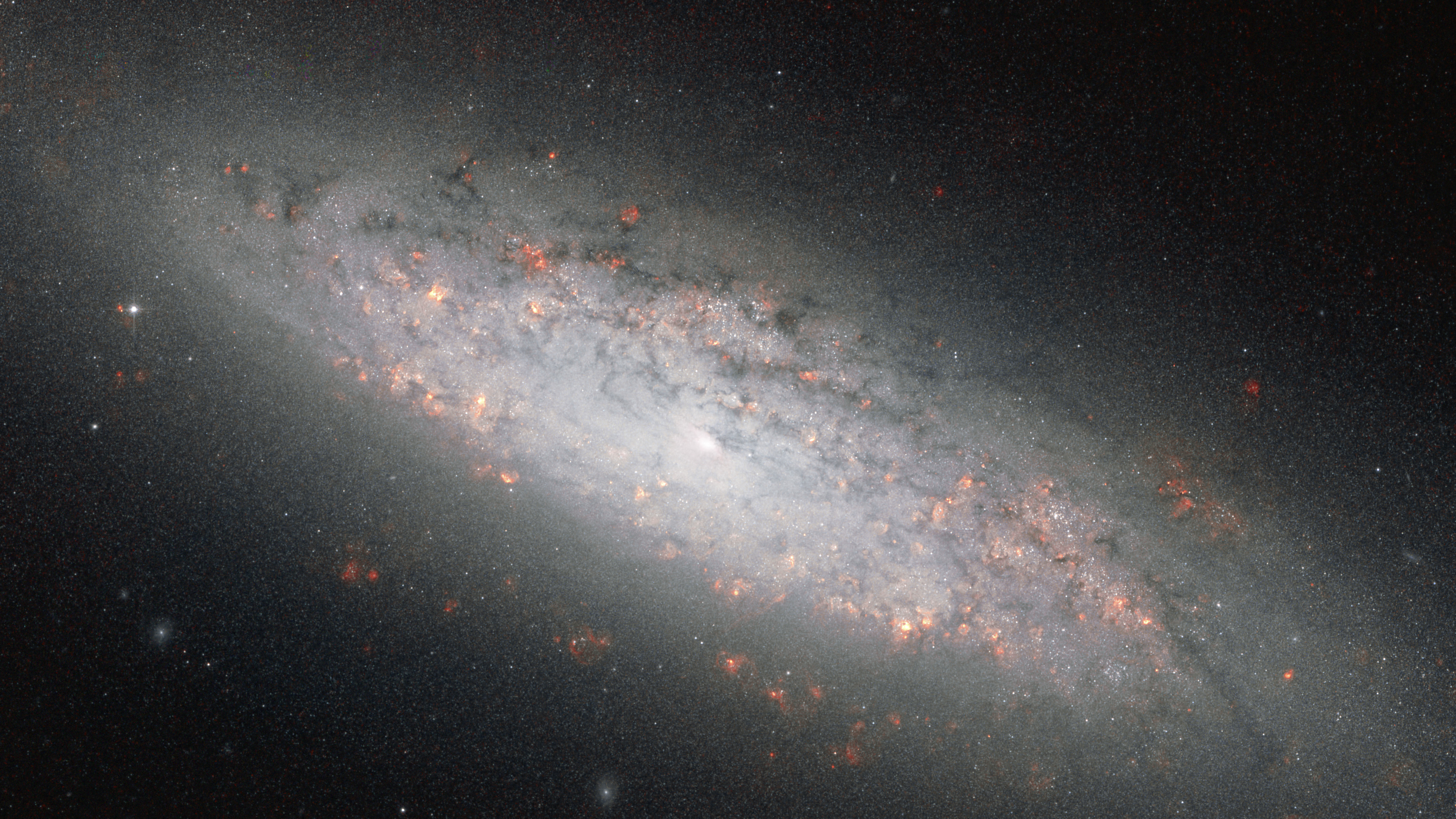
NGC 6503 from Hubble.
