= Laird A. Thompson =

Laird A. Thompson (born 6 September 1947), is a professor emeritus of astronomy at the University of Illinois Urbana-Champaign. Thompson graduated with a B.A. in both physics and astronomy from the University of California, Los Angeles in 1969. He received his Ph.D. in astronomy from the University of Arizona in 1974. He is professionally associated with the International Astronomical Union, the American Astronomical Society, the Astronomical Society of the Pacific, the International Society for Optical Engineering, and has served as an adjunct member of the Center for Adaptive Optics.

== Work in Astronomy ==
From 1974 to 1987, Thompson worked in extragalactic astronomy and he concentrated on clusters of galaxy, galaxy morphology, and galaxy redshift surveys. In 1978, along with Stephen Gregory, he discovered voids. In the early 1980s, he began to work on projects aimed at improving the image quality at ground-based telescopes. His first instrument was a microprocessor controlled tip-tilt system called ISIS which was built at the Institute for Astronomy for use at the Mauna Kea Observatory in Hawaii. From 1990 to present, Thompson has worked in adaptive optics.
