= Abell 2152 =

Galaxy cluster in the constellation Hercules

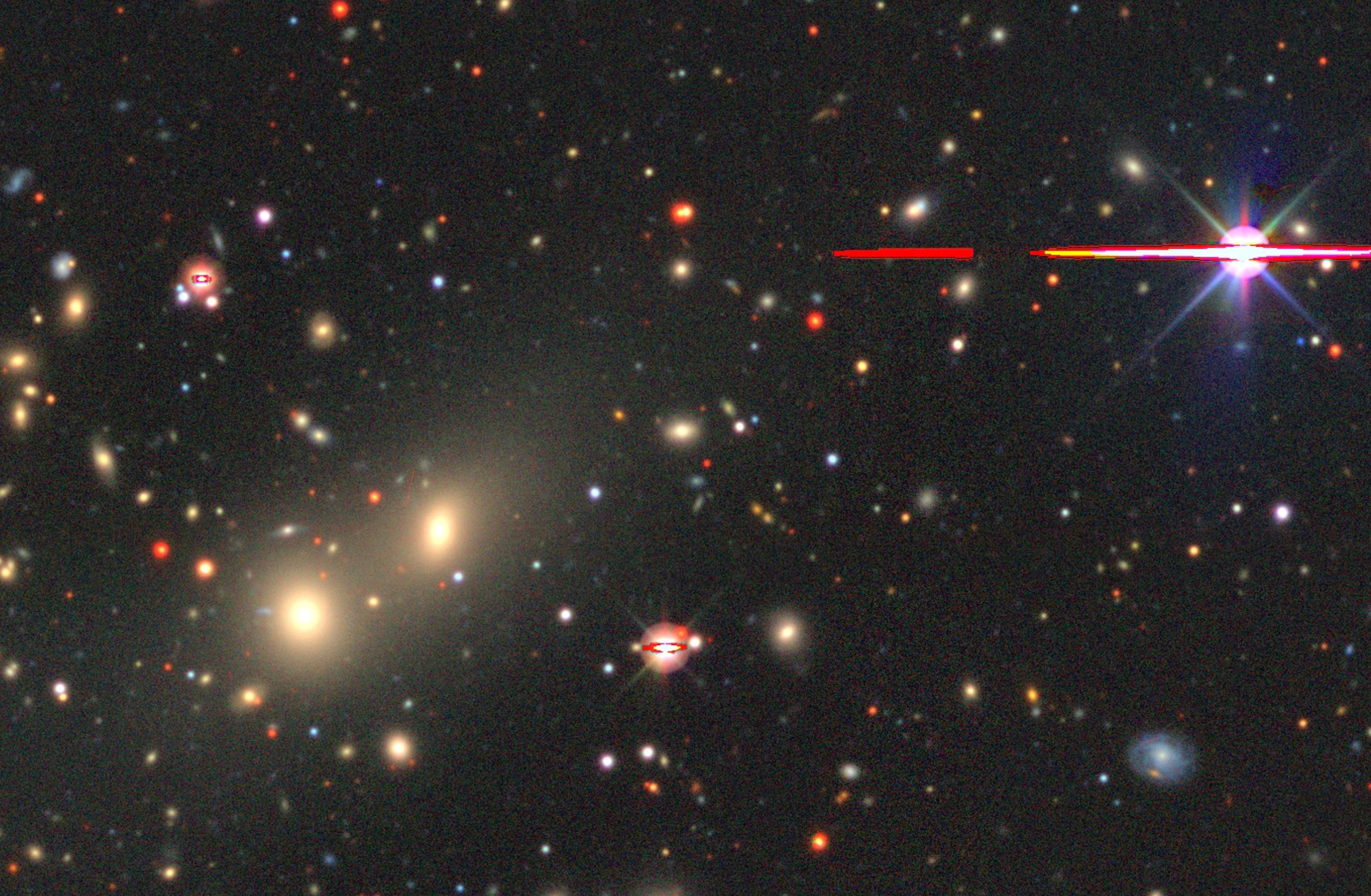
- Abell 2152 seen by DESI Legacy Surveys DR11

Observation data (Epoch J2000)
- Constellation: Hercules
- Right ascension: 16^{h} 05^{m} 32.2^{s}
- Declination: +16° 26′ 31″
- Brightest member: UGC 10204
- Richness class: 1
- Redshift: 0.041
- Distance: 169 Mpc (551 Mly) h^{−1}_{0.73}

Other designations
- CID 59, CAN 059, MCXC J1605.5+1626, WCB96 J19, SCL 160 NED09, EAD2007 222, ZwCl 1603.0+1639.

Abell 2152 is a bimodal galaxy cluster and one of three clusters comprising the Hercules Supercluster or known as (SCL 160), together with another 11 members. It contains 3 BCGs; the S0 lenticular UGC 10204, the pair UGC 10187, and the SA0 unbarred lenticular CGCG 108-083. In total there are 41 galaxies which are confirmed to be members of the cluster. The cluster is classified as a Bautz-Morgan type III and Rood-Sastry class F cluster, indicating morphological irregularity and perhaps dynamical youth. It is receding from the Milky Way galaxy with a velocity of 12385 km/s.

Abell 2152 is the nearest cluster in which significant gravitational lensing of a background source has been observed. The arc-like background galaxy, known as J160529.52+162633.9, lies at a redshift z=0.1423 and has been magnified by a factor ~1.9 due to the lensing effect.

== Gallery ==
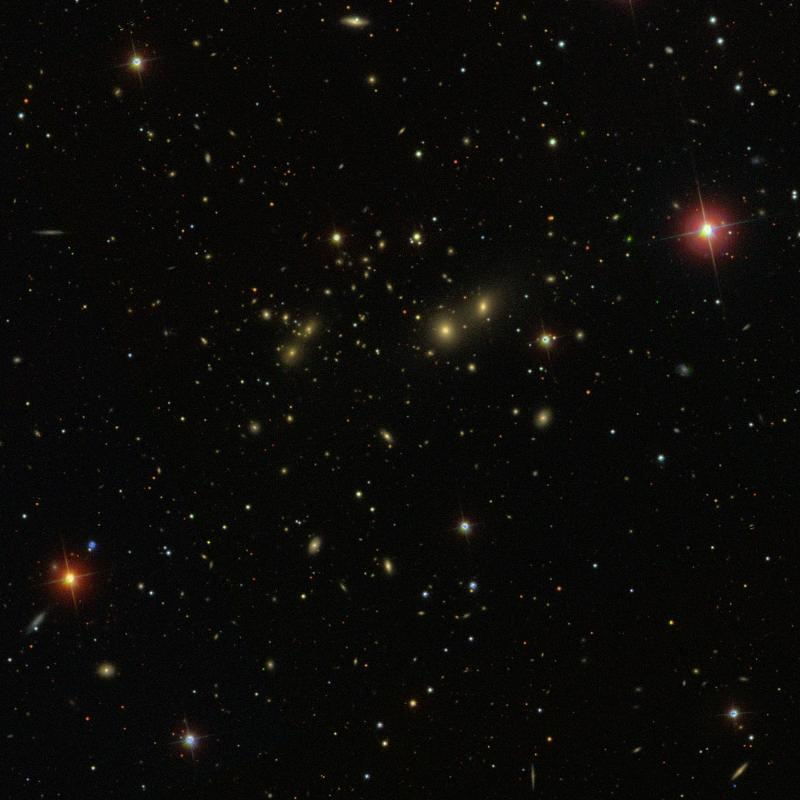
Abell 2152 with Color

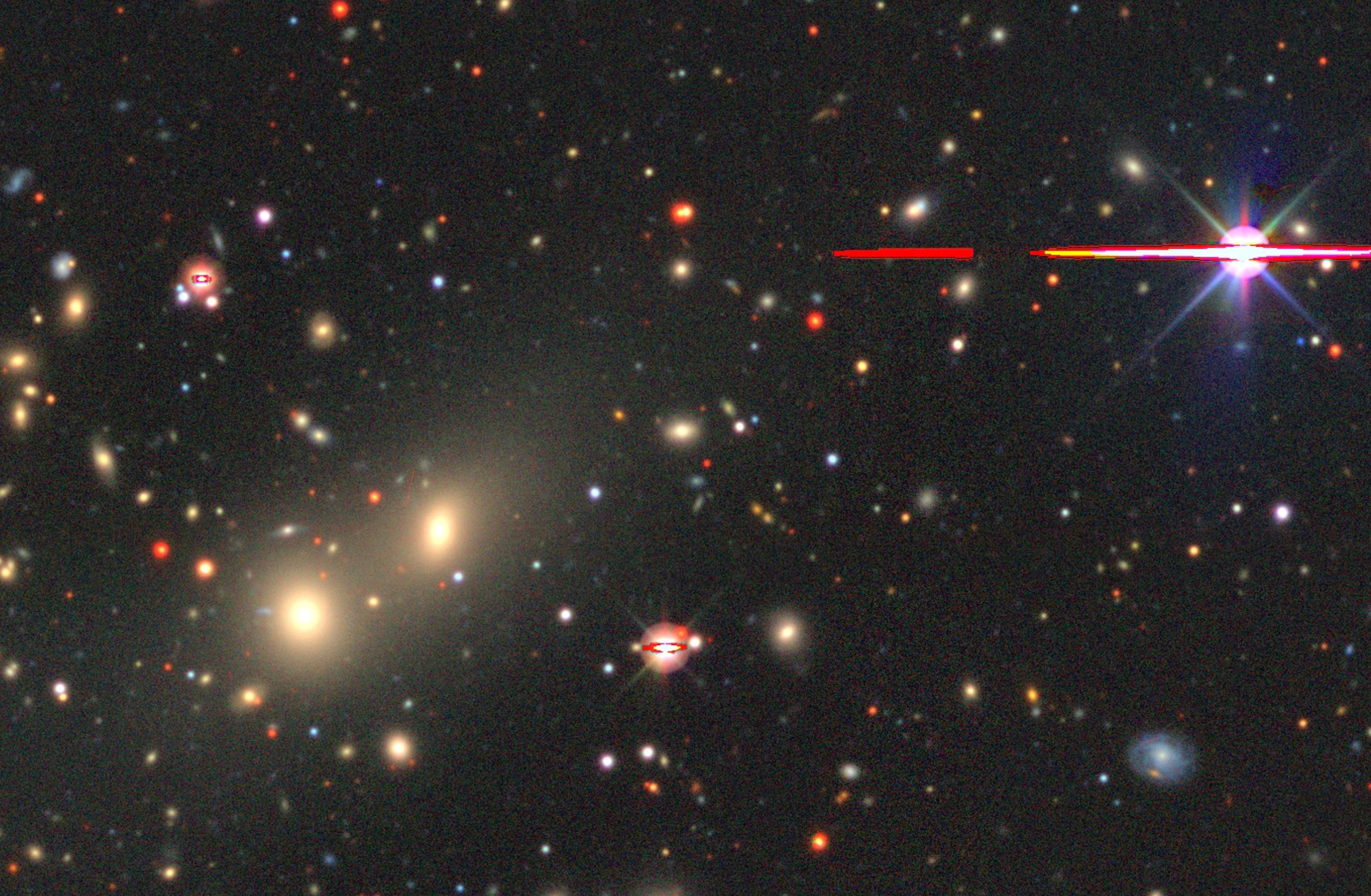
Abell 2152 seen by DESI Legacy Surveys

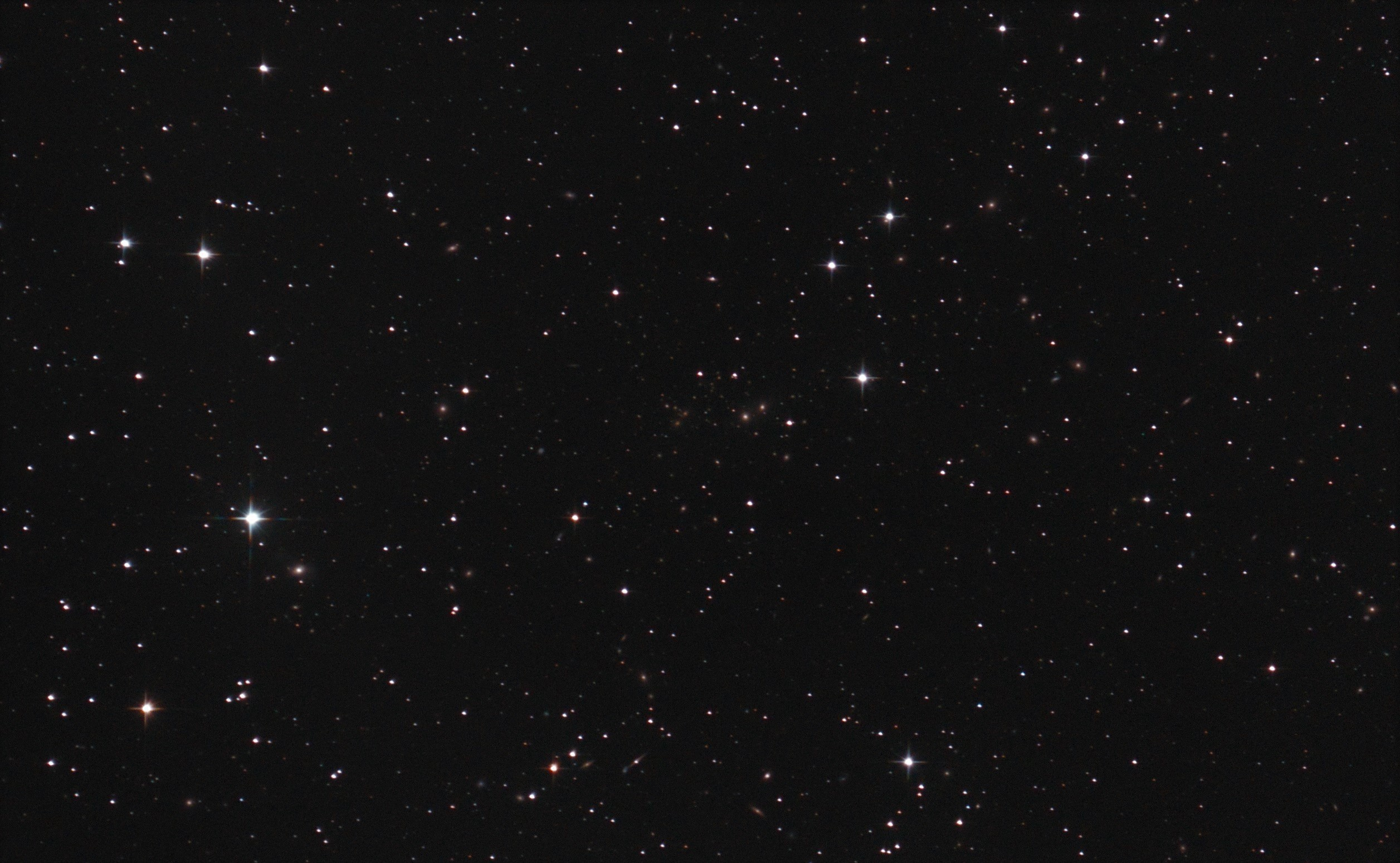
Abell 2152
