= Microscopium Void =

Void in Microscopium

The Microscopium Void is a void—a roughly rectangular region of relatively empty space, bounded by incomplete sheets of galaxies from other voids in the southern celestial hemisphere. It lies within the boundaries of the constellation of Microscopium. It was discovered and named by South African astronomer Tony Fairall in 1984.

== See also ==
- List of voids
