= NGC 6086 =

Galaxy in the constellation Corona Borealis

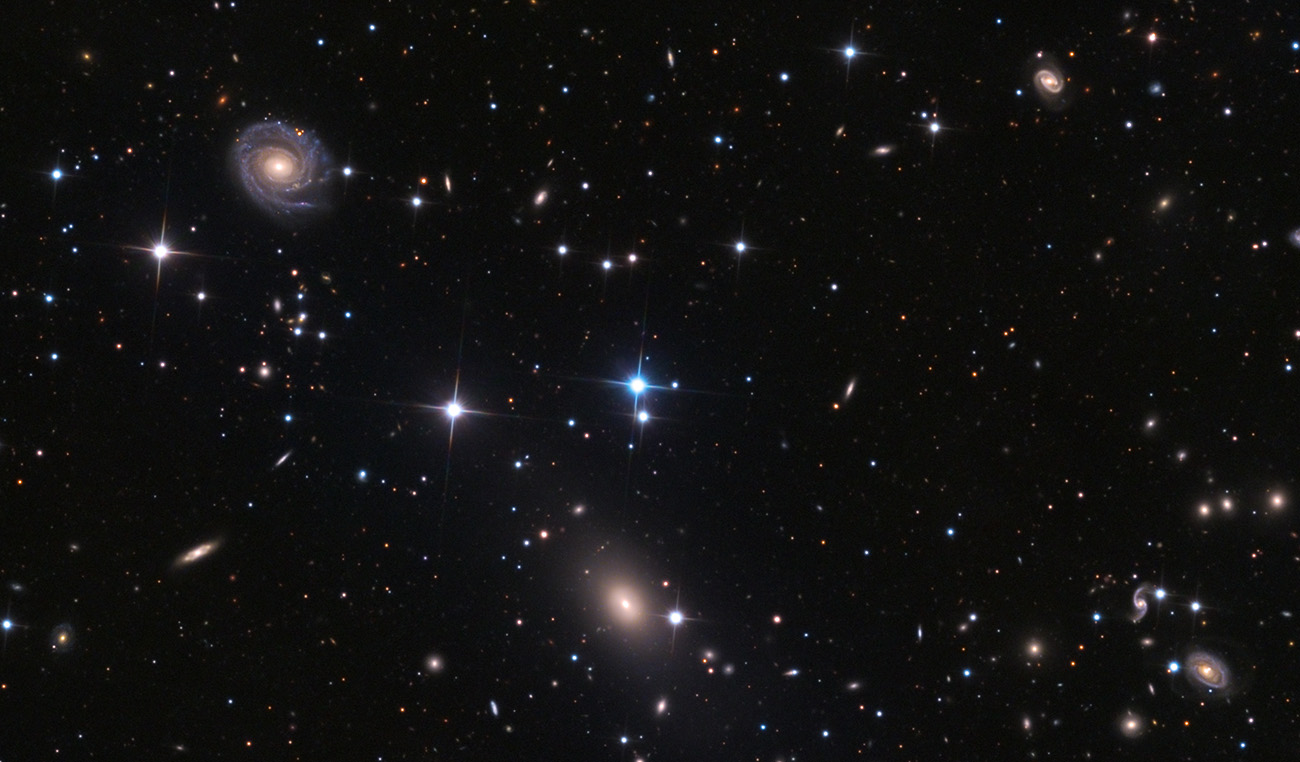
- NGC 6086 (below, center) and NGC 6085

Observation data (J2000 epoch)
- Constellation: Corona Borealis
- Right ascension: 16^{h} 12^{m} 35.4^{s}
- Declination: +29° 29′ 02″
- Redshift: 0.03185
- Heliocentric radial velocity: 9549 km/s
- Distance: 462.3 ± 32.4 Mly (141.73 ± 9.93 Mpc)
- Apparent magnitude (V): 12.7

Characteristics
- Type: E

Other designations
- UGC 10270, MCG +05-38-035, PGC 57482

NGC 6086 is an elliptical galaxy in the constellation of Corona Borealis. It has an apparent magnitude of 12.7. A Type-cD galaxy, it is the brightest cluster galaxy in the cluster Abell 2162. In 2010, a supermassive black hole was discovered in NGC 6086.
