= Local Hole =

Large, comparatively empty region of space

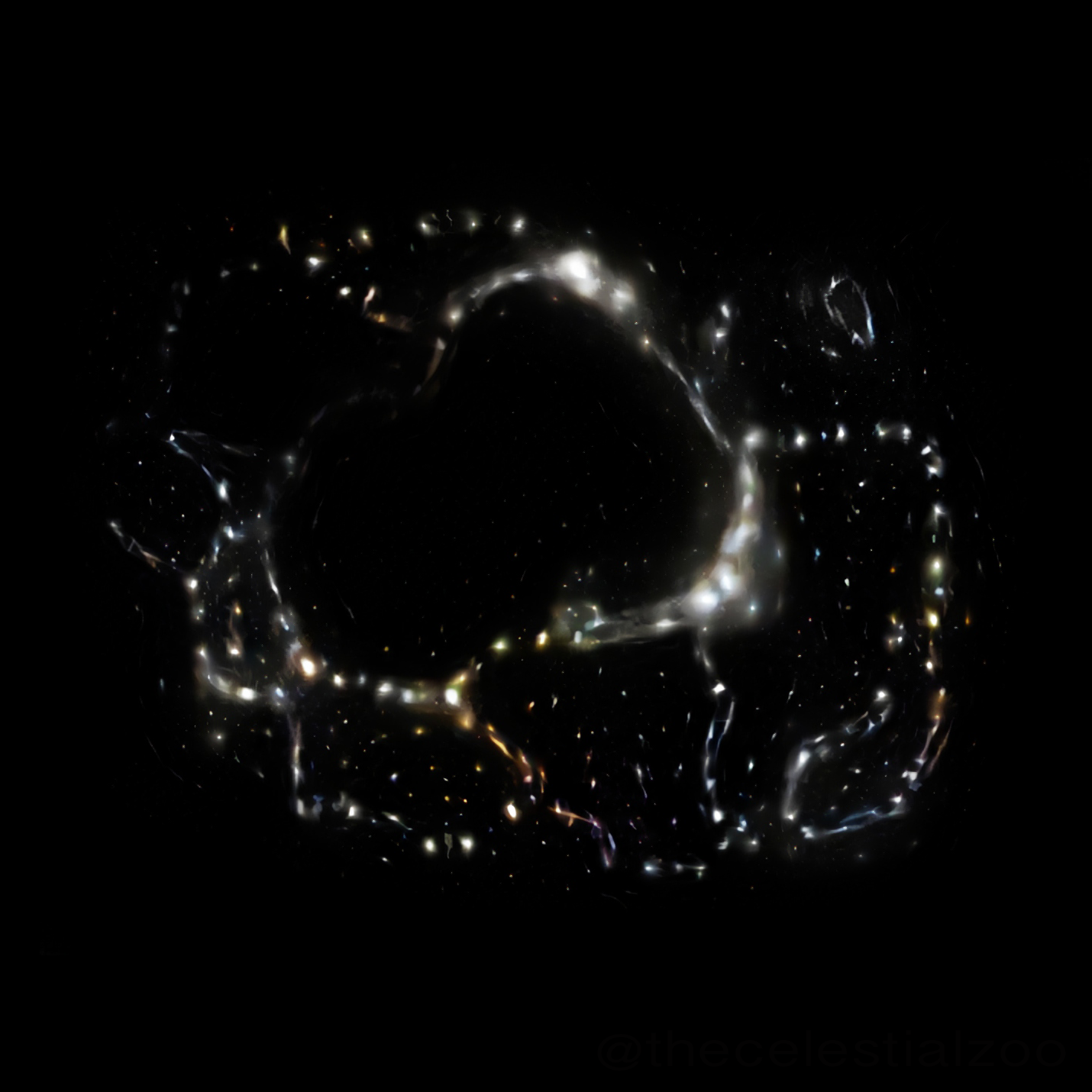
- Artistic impression of the KBC Void
- Object type: Void
- Other designations: KBC Void

Observation data (Epoch N/A)
- Right ascension: whole sky
- Declination: whole sky
- Radius: 1 billion ly

The Local Hole, also known as the KBC Void, is an immense, comparatively empty region of space, named after astronomers Ryan Keenan, Amy Barger, and Lennox Cowie, who studied it in 2013. The existence of a local underdensity has been the subject of many pieces of literature and research articles. Its existence is still disputed, as it remains hypothetical, and controversial.

The underdensity is proposed to be roughly spherical, approximately 2 billion light-years (600 megaparsecs, Mpc) in diameter. As with other voids, it is not completely empty; it contains the Milky Way, the Local Group, and the larger part of the Laniakea Supercluster. The Milky Way is within a few hundred million light-years of the void's center.

It is debated whether the existence of the KBC Void is consistent with the ΛCDM model. While Haslbauer et al. say that voids as large as the KBC void are not consistent with ΛCDM, Sahlén et al. argue that they are. Galaxies inside a void experience a gravitational pull from outside the void, which yields a larger local value for the Hubble constant, a cosmological measure of how fast the universe expands. Some authors have proposed the structure as the cause of the discrepancy between measurements of the Hubble constant using galactic supernovae and Cepheid variables (72–75 km/s/Mpc) and the cosmic microwave background and baryon acoustic oscillation (BAO) data (67–68 km/s/Mpc). BAO data presented at NAM 2025 showed that a void model is ~1×10^{8} times more likely than a void-free model consistent with Planck cosmology.

Other work has found no evidence for this in observations, finding the scale of the claimed underdensity to be incompatible with observations which extend beyond its radius. Important deficiencies were subsequently pointed out in this analysis, leaving open the possibility that the Hubble tension is indeed caused by outflow from the KBC Void, albeit in the context of MOND gravity rather than general relativity. It was later discovered that this outflow model successfully predicted the bulk flow curve, an important measure of the velocity field in the local Universe.

== See also ==
- Void (astronomy)
- Boötes Void
- Giant Void
- Local Void
- Observable universe
- List of largest voids
- Hubble bubble (astronomy)
- Northern Local Supervoid
- Southern Local Supervoid
