= Abell 2162 =

Galaxy cluster in the constellation Corona Borealis

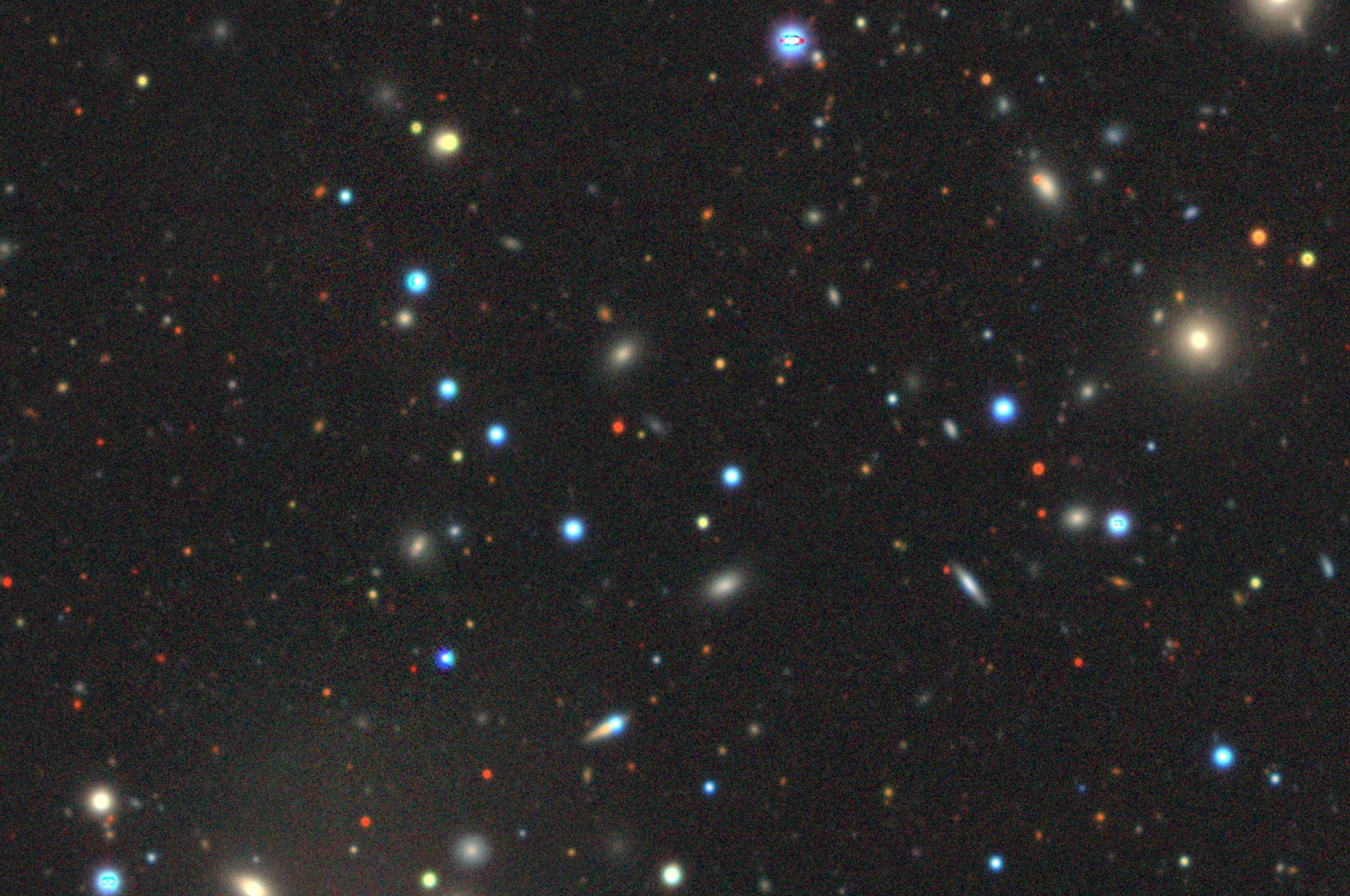
- Abell 2162 seen by DESI Legacy Surveys

Observation data (Epoch J2000)
- Constellation: Corona Borealis
- Right ascension: 16^{h} 12^{m} 30.0^{s}
- Declination: +29° 32′ 23″
- Bautz–Morgan classification: I

Abell 2162 is a galaxy cluster in the Abell catalogue located in the constellation Corona Borealis. It is a member of the Hercules Superclusters, the redshifts of the member galaxies of which lie between 0.0304 and 0.0414. The cluster hosts a massive Type-cD galaxy called NGC 6086.

== See also ==
- Abell catalogue
- List of Abell clusters
- X-ray astronomy

== Gallery ==
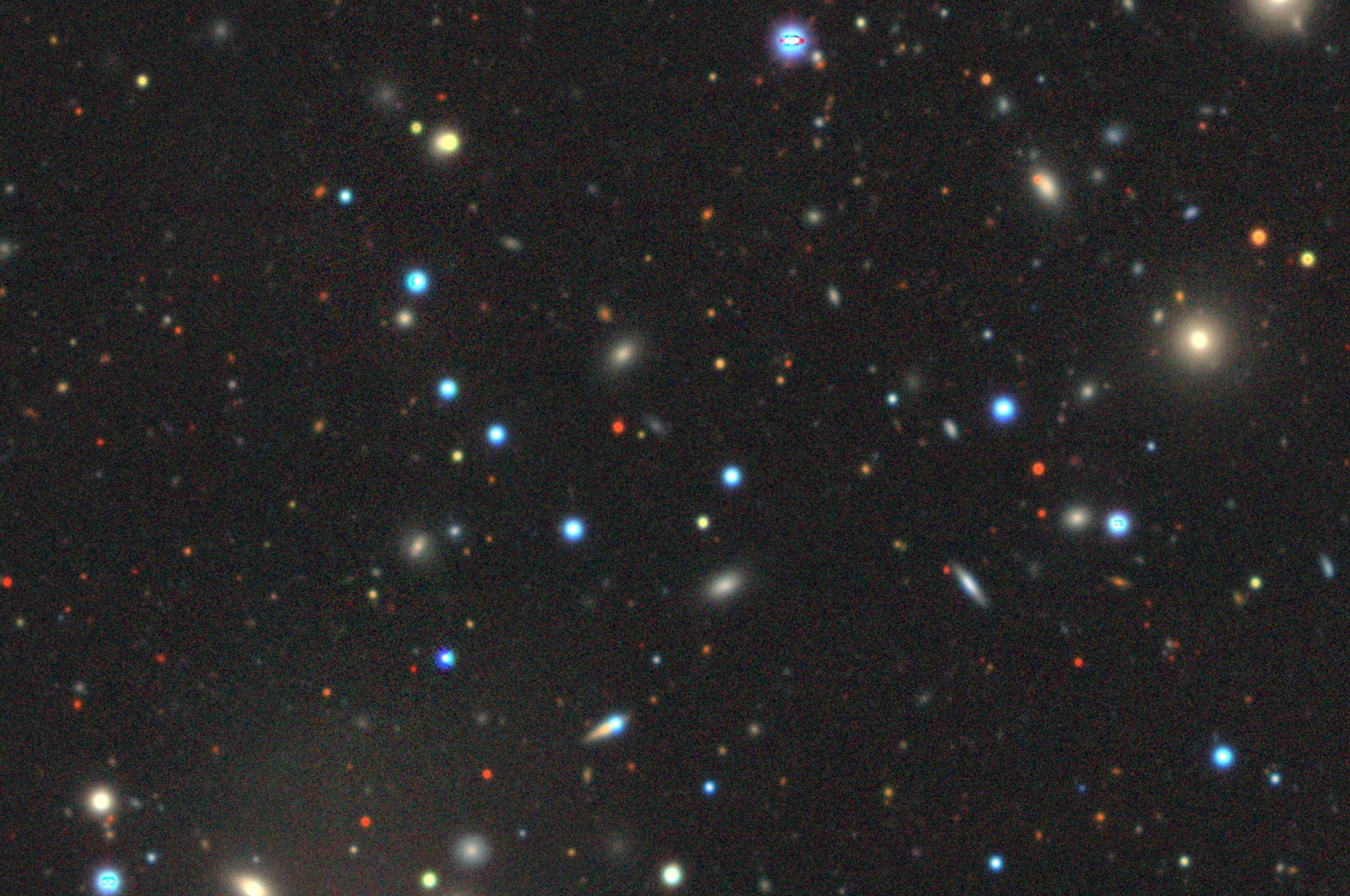
Abell 2162 seen by DESI Legacy Surveys

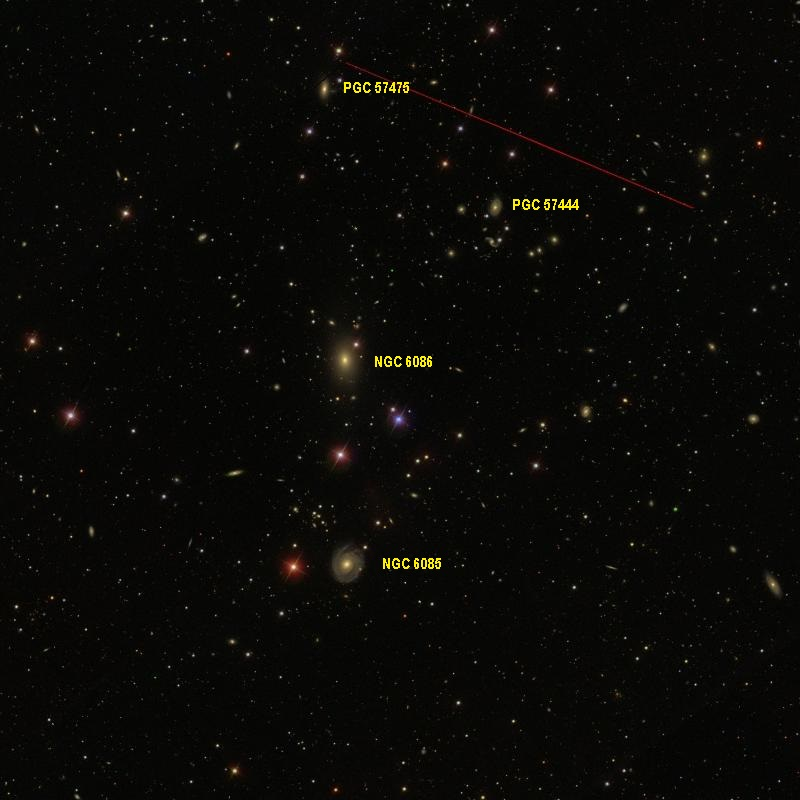
Abell 2162

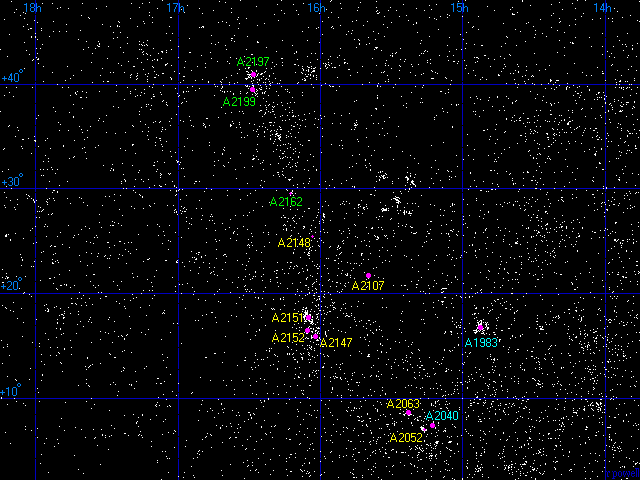
Abell 2162 position in the Hercules Supercluster
