= Southern Local Supervoid =

Large void next to the Local supercluster

The Southern Local Supervoid is a tremendously large, nearly empty region of space (a void).

It lies next to the Local Supercluster, which contains our galaxy the Milky Way. Its center is 96 megaparsecs away and the void is 112 megaparsecs in diameter across its narrowest width. Its volume is very approximately 600 billion times that of the Milky Way. See volumes of similar orders of magnitude.

== See also ==
- List of largest voids
- KBC Void
