= Local Void =

Vast void adjacent to the Local Group

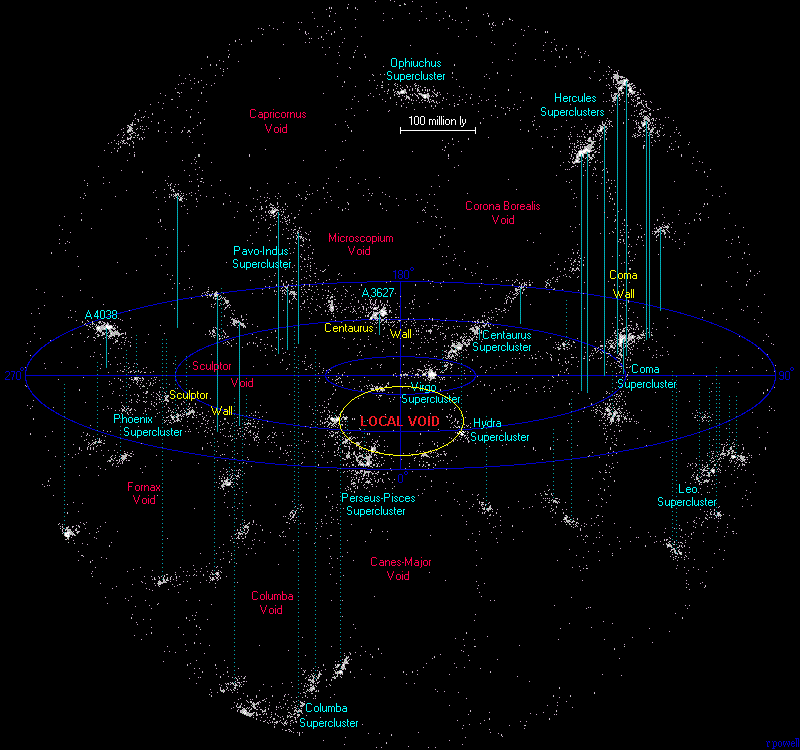
- Map of voids and superclusters within 500 million light years of the Milky Way. The Local Void is indicated by the yellow circle.
- Object type: Void

Observation data (Epoch J2000.0)
- Constellation: Hercules
- Right ascension: 18^{h} 38^{m}
- Declination: +18.0°
- In visual light (V)
- Size: 60 Mpc (200 Mly)

The Local Void is a vast, empty region of space, lying adjacent to the Local Group. Discovered by Brent Tully and Rick Fisher in 1987, the Local Void is now known to be composed of three separate sectors, separated by bridges of "wispy filaments". The precise extent of the void is unknown, but it is at least 45 Mpc (150 million light-years) across, and possibly 150 to 300 Mpc. The Local Void appears to have significantly fewer galaxies than expected from standard cosmology.

== Location and dimensions ==
Voids are affected by the way gravity causes matter in the universe to "clump together", herding galaxies into clusters and chains, which are separated by regions mostly devoid of galaxies, yet the exact mechanisms are subject to scientific debate.

Astronomers have previously noticed that the Milky Way sits in a large, flat array of galaxies called the Local Sheet, which bounds the Local Void. The Local Void extends approximately 60 megaparsecs (200 Mly), beginning at the edge of the Local Group. It is believed that the distance from Earth to the centre of the Local Void must be at least 23 megaparsecs (75 Mly).

The size of the Local Void was calculated by means of an isolated dwarf galaxy known as ESO 461-36 located inside it. The bigger and emptier the void, the weaker its gravity, and the faster the dwarf should be fleeing the void towards concentrations of matter, although discrepancies give room for competing explanations, including the conjectured dark energy.

An earlier "Hubble Bubble" model, based on measured velocities of Type 1a supernovae, proposed a relative void centred on the Milky Way. Recent analysis of that data, however, suggested that interstellar dust had resulted in misleading measurements.

Several authors have shown that the local universe up to 300 Mpc from the Milky Way is less dense than surrounding areas – by 15–50%. This has been called the Local Void or Local Hole. Some media reports have dubbed it the KBC Void, although this name has not been taken up in other publications.

== Effect on surroundings ==
Scientists believe that the Local Void is growing and that the Local Sheet, which makes up one wall of the void, is rushing away from the void's centre at 260 kilometres per second (160 mi/s). Concentrations of matter normally pull together, creating a larger void where matter is rushing away. The Local Void is surrounded uniformly by matter in all directions, except for one sector in which there is nothing, which has the effect of taking more matter away from that sector. The effect on the nearby galaxy is astonishingly large. The Milky Way's velocity away from the Local Void is 970,000 kilometres per hour (600,000 mph).

== List of void galaxies ==
Several void galaxies have been found within the Local Void. These include:

Galaxy	Image	Constellation	Right ascension	Declination	Distance	Notes
Pisces A		Pisces	00h 14m 46.000s	+10° 48′ 47.01″	18.4 Mly (5.64 Mpc)	The two void dwarf galaxies located in the Local Void and are in the Pisces constellation. Pisces A is 18.4 million light-years (5.64 megaparsecs) away and Pisces B is 30 million light-years (9.2 megaparsecs) away. The galaxies were discovered with the WIYN Observatory. About 100 million years ago, they started moving out of the void and into the local filament zone and denser gaseous environment. This sparked off a doubling of the rate of star formation.
Pisces B		Pisces	01h 19m 11.700s	+11° 07′ 18.22″	30 Mly (9.2 Mpc)	The two void dwarf galaxies located in the Local Void and are in the Pisces constellation. Pisces A is 18.4 million light-years (5.64 megaparsecs) away and Pisces B is 30 million light-years (9.2 megaparsecs) away. The galaxies were discovered with the WIYN Observatory. About 100 million years ago, they started moving out of the void and into the local filament zone and denser gaseous environment. This sparked off a doubling of the rate of star formation.
NGC 7077		Aquarius	21h 29m 59.6s	+02° 24′ 51″	56 Mly (17.2 Mpc)	A lenticular blue compact dwarf galaxy located about 56 million light-years away from Earth in the constellation Aquarius. Discovered by astronomer Albert Marth on 11 August 1863, the galaxy lies within the Local Void.
NGC 6503		Draco	17h 49m 26.4207s	+70° 08′ 39.587″	13.05 ± 0.33 Mly (4.0 ± 0.1 Mpc)	A field dwarf spiral galaxy located at the edge of the Local Void. The dwarf galaxy spans 30,000 light-years and lies approximately 17 million light-years away in the constellation of Draco (the Dragon). This spiral galaxy is especially colorful, with bright red regions of gas scattered through its spiral arms. Bright blue regions contain stars that are forming. Dark brown dust areas are in the galaxy's arms and center. It has one known satellite galaxy, known as KK 242. With a stellar mass of about 3 million solar masses, KK 242 is on the border between a dwarf irregular galaxy (dIrr) and a dwarf spheroidal galaxy (dSph).
NGC 6789		Draco	19h 16m 41s	+63° 58′ 23″	12 Mly (3.6 Mpc)	An irregular galaxy in the constellation Draco. It was discovered by Lewis Swift on 30 August 1883. It is the nearest blue compact dwarf (BCD) galaxy to the Milky Way. It is chemically homogeneous and relatively metal-poor.
ESO 461-36		Sagittarius	20h 03m 57.3s	-31° 40′ 53.6″	24.4 Mly (7.48 Mpc)	ESO 461-036 also known as KK 246 is a dwarf irregular galaxy located inside the local void.

== See also ==
- Dipole repeller – Center of effective repulsion in the large-scale flow of galaxies near the Milky Way
- List of voids
