= Hercules Superclusters =

Superclusters in the constellation Hercules

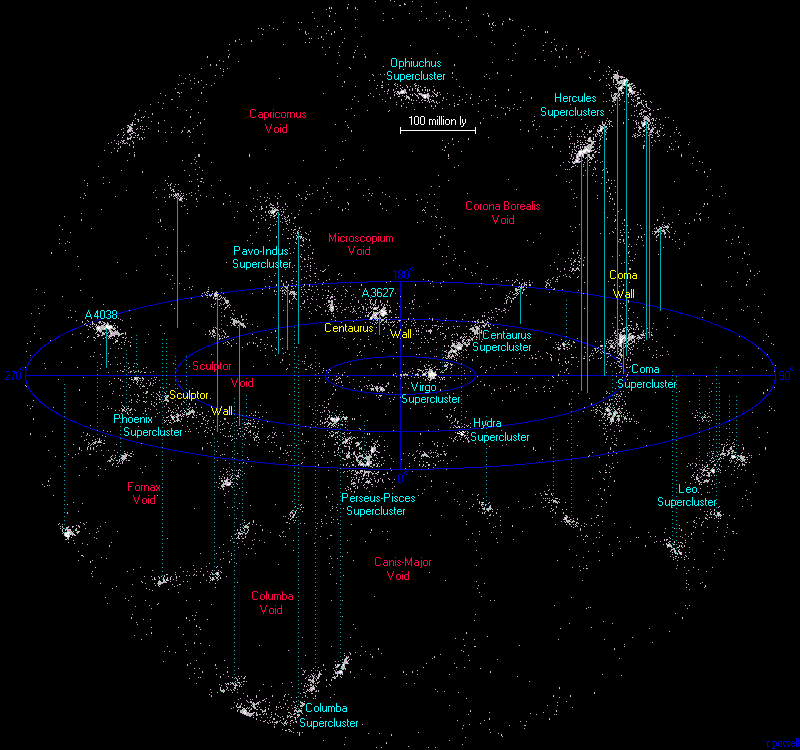
- Hercules Superclusters are shown at the top right

Observation data (Epoch )
- Constellation: Hercules
- Major axis: 100 Mpc (326 Mly)
- Redshift: 0.0304-0.0414

Other designations
- SCl 160

The Hercules Superclusters (SCl 160) refers to a set of two nearby superclusters of galaxies.

Relative to other local superclusters, Hercules is considered particularly large, being approximately 330 Mly in diameter. The Northern Local Supervoid lies in front of the superclusters, and is as big as the superclusters themselves. The redshifts of the member galaxies lie between 0.0304 and 0.0414.

Hercules Superclusters has a total of 12 members, which includes Abell 2147, Abell 2151 (Hercules Cluster), Abell 2040, Abell 2052, Abell 2055, Abell 2063, Abell 2107, Abell 2148, Abell 2197, Abell 2199 and Abell 2152 galaxy clusters. An extremely long filament of galaxies has been found, that connects this group of clusters to the Abell 2197 and Abell 2199 pair. Abell 2162 in the nearby constellation Corona Borealis is also a member.

The Hercules Superclusters are near the Coma Supercluster, helping make up part of the CfA2 Great Wall.

In the 1930s, Harlow Shapley studied the structure of the distribution of galaxies in the constellation of Hercules, and was probably first to discover the existence of a supercluster in that region. However, this was not confirmed until the 1970s. In 1976, Massimo Tarenghi suggested that the A2151 cluster was part of a single supercluster, and at a conference in Estonia in 1977, he, together with several other astronomers, presented evidence that it was indeed a supercluster that appeared in that region.

== See also ==
- Abell catalogue
- Large-scale structure of the universe
- List of Abell clusters
