= Boötes Void =

Region of space

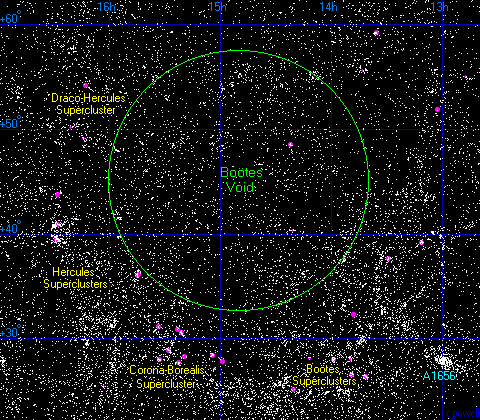
A map of the Boötes Void

The Boötes Void (/boʊˈoʊtiːz/ boh-OH-teez) (colloquially referred to as the Great Nothing) is a roughly spherical region of space in the vicinity of the constellation Boötes. It contains just 60 galaxies, which is significantly fewer than the approximately 2,000 galaxies expected for an area of comparable size. With a radius of 62 megaparsecs (nearly 200 million light-years), it is one of the largest known voids in the visible universe, and is often referred to as a "supervoid".

It was discovered in 1981 by astronomer Robert Kirshner as part of a survey of galactic redshift to map the large-scale structure of the universe. Its center is located 700 million light-years from Earth, at right ascension 14^{h} 50^{m} and declination 46°.

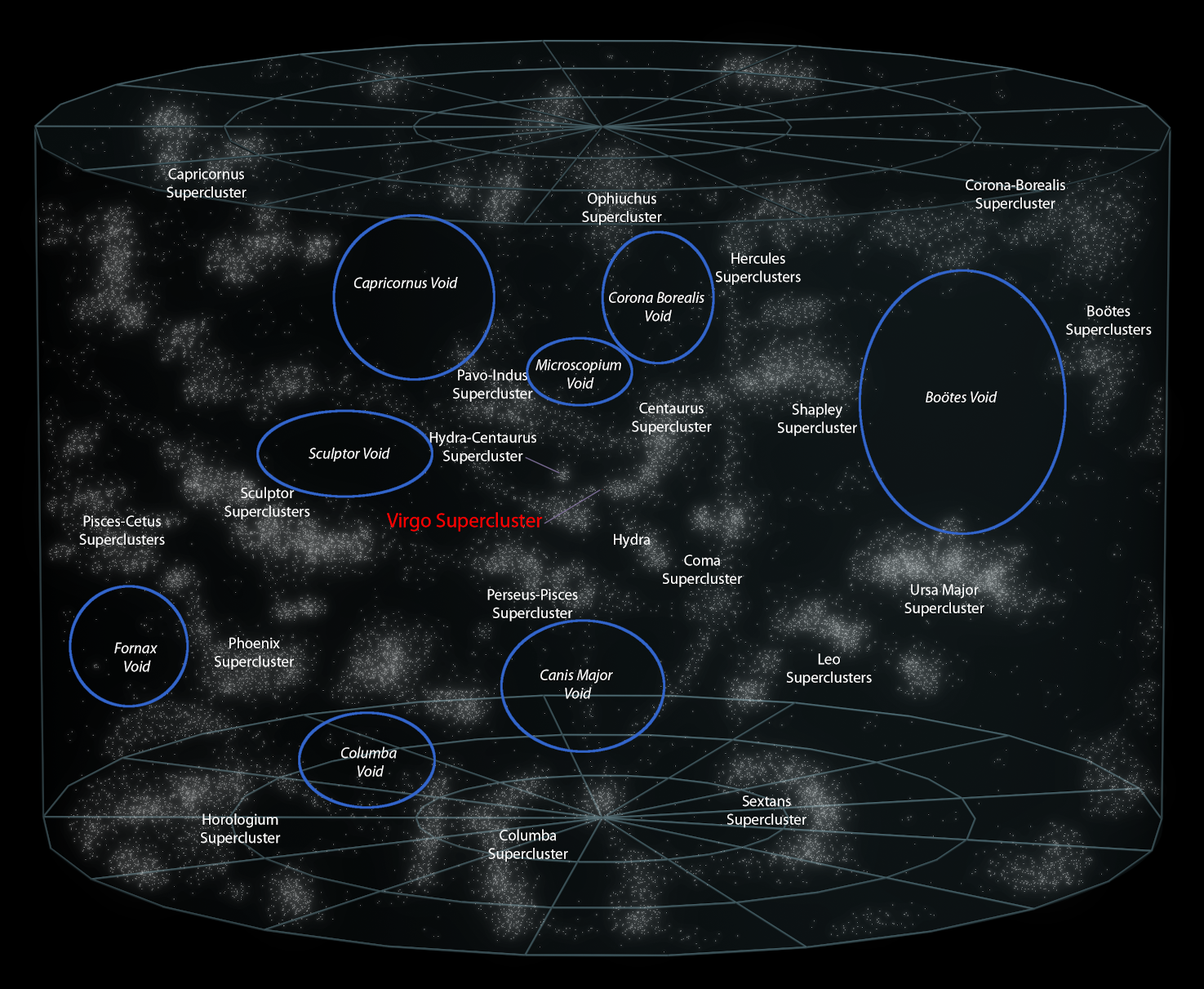
A map of galaxy voids

The Hercules Superclusters are part of the near edge of the void. In the surrounding field of Boötes Void, the closest Superclusters are Corona Borealis Supercluster in the background and Hercules Superclusters in the foreground. Abell 1749 and Abell 2022 lie just outside of the Boötes Void.

== Formation ==
The existence of the Boötes Void does not appear to conflict with the Lambda-cold dark matter (ΛCDM) model of cosmological evolution. It is hypothesized that the Boötes Void formed through the coalescence of smaller voids. This process may explain the presence of a limited number of galaxies within a roughly cylindrical region extending through the center of the void.

== See also ==
- Baryon acoustic oscillations
- Black hole
- Cosmos

== Sources ==
- Kirshner, R.P.; Oemler, A.J.; Schechter, P.L.; Shectman, S.A. (1981). "A million cubic megaparsec void in Bootes". The Astrophysical Journal. 248: L57–60. Bibcode:1981ApJ...248L..57K. doi:10.1086/183623.
- Kirshner, R.P.; Oemler, A.J.; Schechter, P.L.; Shectman, S.A. (1987). "A survey of the Bootes void". The Astrophysical Journal. 314: 493. Bibcode:1987ApJ...314..493K. doi:10.1086/165080. S2CID 118385803.
