= Pisces =

Pisces may refer to:

== Astronomy ==
- Pisces (constellation), a constellation
  - Pisces (Chinese astronomy), the division of the sky in traditional Chinese uranography that lies across the modern constellation Pisces
  - Pisces I or Pisces Dwarf, a satellite galaxy of the Triangulum Galaxy
  - Pisces II, a satellite galaxy of the Milky Way
  - Pisces VII, an ultra-faint dwarf satellite galaxy of the Triangulum galaxy
  - Pisces A, a void dwarf galaxy in the Pisces constellation
  - Pisces B, a void dwarf galaxy in the Pisces constellation
  - Pisces Overdensity, an over-density of stars in the Milky Way's halo

== Astrology ==
- Pisces (astrology), an astrological sign

== Science and technology ==
- Pisces, an obsolete (because of land vertebrates) taxonomic superclass including all fish
- PISCES (Personal Identification Secure Comparison and Evaluation System), a border control database system administered by the United States Department of State

== Music ==
- Pisces (Art Blakey album), a 1961 album by Art Blakey & the Jazz Messengers
- Pisces (James Arthur album), 205
- Pisces (band), a psychedelic rock band
- "Pisces", a 2016 song by Jinjer from King of Everything
- "Pisces", a 2018 song by Brant Bjork from Mankind Woman

== Ships ==
- Pisces-class deep submergence vehicle, a class of three-person research deep-submergence vehicles
- NOAAS Pisces, an American fisheries and oceanographic research ship in commission in the National Oceanic and Atmospheric Administration since 2009

== Media ==
- Pisces (character), a Marvel Comics character
- Pisces (film), 2023 Israeli animated film

== Other ==
- Pisces (restaurant), a restaurant located at the Wynn Las Vegas
