= NGC 5630 =

Galaxy in the constellation Boötes

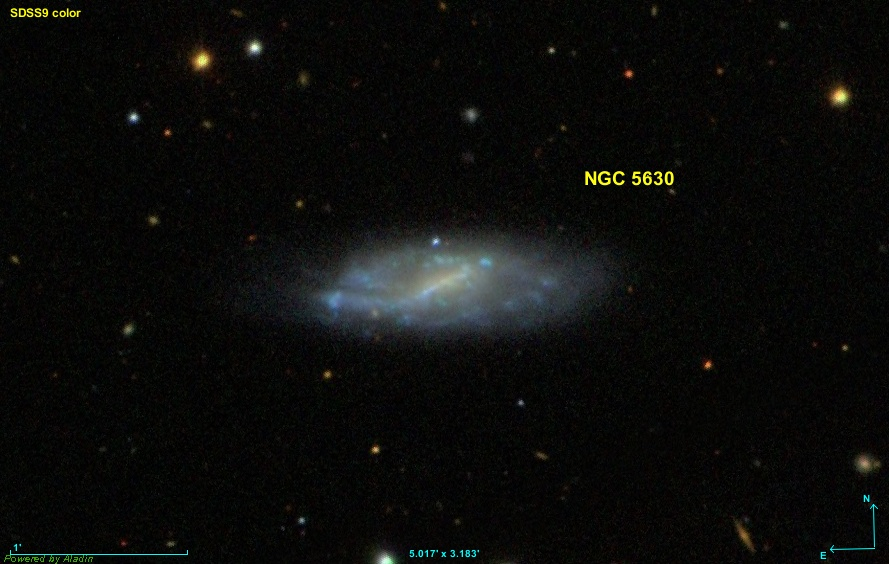
- NGC 5630 imaged by SDSS

Observation data (J2000 epoch)
- Constellation: Boötes
- Right ascension: 14^{h} 27^{m} 36.5894^{s}
- Declination: +41° 15′ 27.918″
- Redshift: 0.008918
- Heliocentric radial velocity: 2673 ± 2 km/s
- Distance: 135.9 ± 9.5 Mly (41.68 ± 2.92 Mpc)
- Apparent magnitude (V): 13.0

Characteristics
- Type: Sdm?
- Size: ~75,700 ly (23.21 kpc) (estimated)
- Apparent size (V): 2.2′ × 0.7′

Other designations
- HOLM 649A, IRAS 14256+4128, 2MASX J14273658+4115281, UGC 9270, MCG +07-30-014, PGC 51635, CGCG 220-018

NGC 5630 is a barred spiral galaxy in the constellation of Boötes. Its velocity with respect to the cosmic microwave background is 2826 ± 11 km/s, which corresponds to a Hubble distance of 41.68 ± 2.92 Mpc (~136 million light-years). It was discovered by German-British astronomer William Herschel on 9 April 1787.

NGC 5630 is listed as a field galaxy, i.e. one does not belong to a larger galaxy group or cluster and hence is gravitationally alone.

== Supernovae ==
Three supernovae have been observed in NGC 5630:

- SN 2005dp (Type II, mag. 16) was discovered by Kōichi Itagaki on 27 August 2005.
- SN 2006am (Type IIn, mag. 18.5) was discovered by the Lick Observatory Supernova Search (LOSS) on 22 February 2006.
- SN 2023zdx (Type II-P, mag. 17.049) was discovered by ATLAS on 8 December 2023.

== See also ==
- List of NGC objects (5001–6000)
