= UGC 6665 =

Barred spiral galaxy in the constellation of Virgo

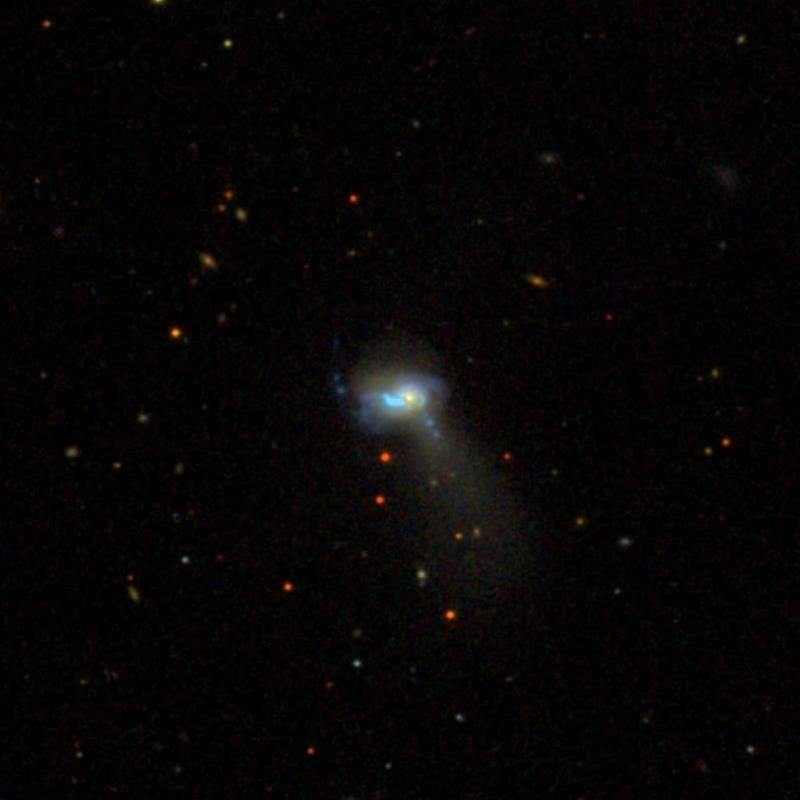
- SDSS image of UGC 6665

Observation data (J2000 epoch)
- Constellation: Virgo
- Right ascension: 11^{h} 42^{m} 12.4^{s}
- Declination: +00° 20′ 03.0″
- Redshift: 0.01855
- Heliocentric radial velocity: 5510 ± 3 km/s
- Distance: 265 Mly (81.2 Mpc)
- Apparent magnitude (V): 13.57
- Apparent magnitude (B): 14.17

Characteristics
- Type: Sb pec:

Other designations
- UM 448, UGC 6665, MCG +00-30-019, PGC 36325

UGC 6665 (Arp 161) is a spiral field galaxy in the constellation Virgo. It is an estimated 265 million light-years from the Milky Way, and is listed in Halton Arp's Atlas of Peculiar Galaxies as number 161.

UGC 6665 is a blue compact dwarf (BCD) galaxy. Like some other BCDs, it has an unusually high ratio of nitrogen to oxygen.
