= NGC 5936 =

Galaxy in the constellation Serpens

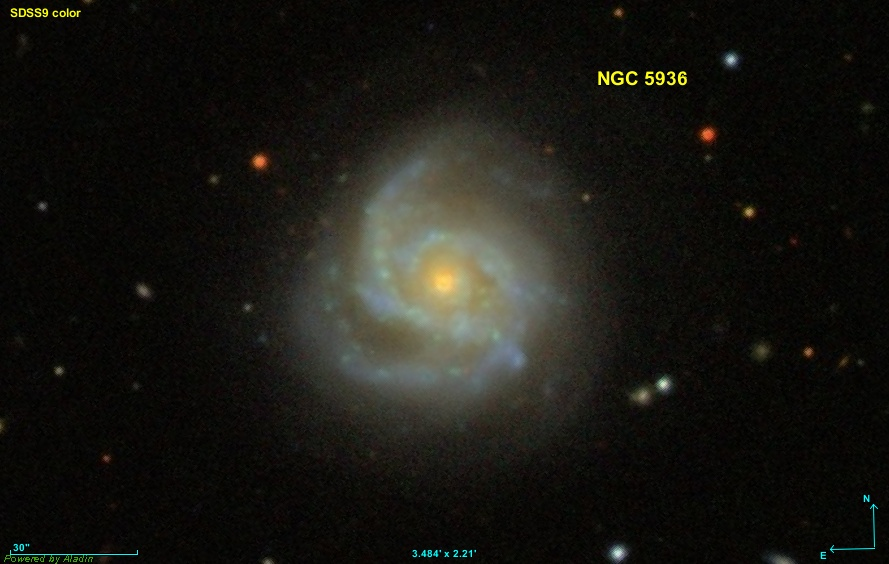
- NGC 5936 imaged by SDSS

Observation data (J2000 epoch)
- Constellation: Serpens
- Right ascension: 15^{h} 30^{m} 00.8451^{s}
- Declination: +12° 59′ 21.472″
- Redshift: 0.013298
- Heliocentric radial velocity: 3987 ± 3 km/s
- Distance: 198.7 ± 13.9 Mly (60.93 ± 4.27 Mpc)
- Apparent magnitude (V): 12.5

Characteristics
- Type: SB(rs)b
- Size: ~81,400 ly (24.97 kpc) (estimated)
- Apparent size (V): 1.4′ × 1.3′

Other designations
- IRAS 15276+1309, 2MASX J15300084+1259215, UGC 9867, MCG +02-39-030, PGC 55255, CGCG 077-137

NGC 5936 is a barred spiral galaxy in the constellation of Serpens. Its velocity with respect to the cosmic microwave background is 4131 ± 11 km/s, which corresponds to a Hubble distance of 60.93 ± 4.27 Mpc (~199 million light-years). It was discovered by German-British astronomer William Herschel on 12 April 1784.

NGC 5936 is listed as a luminous infrared galaxy (LIRG), and as a field galaxy, i.e. one that does not belong to a larger galaxy group or cluster and hence is gravitationally alone.

== Supernovae ==
Two supernovae have been observed in NGC 5936:

- SN 2013dh (Type Ia, mag. 18) was discovered by the Lick Observatory Supernova Search (LOSS) on 12 June 2013.
- SN 2023awp (Type IIn, mag. 19.58) was discovered by the Zwicky Transient Facility on 27 January 2023.

== See also ==
- List of NGC objects (5001–6000)
