= Pisces II =

Galaxy in the constellation Pisces

Observation data (J2000 epoch)
- Constellation: Pisces
- Right ascension: 22^{h} 58^{m} 31^{s}
- Declination: +05° 57′ 09″
- Distance: 585 kly (180 kpc)
- Apparent magnitude (V): 17.03
- Absolute magnitude (V): −4.28

Characteristics
- Type: dSph
- Apparent size (V): 2.2^{+0.2}_{−0.2}′

Other designations
- Pisces II, Psc II (Note: Andromeda II was also given the alias Pisces II by Martin et al. (2009), who also proposed aliases for several other satellite galaxies of the Andromeda Galaxy However, that name was later used by a different group unaware of these names, for this object.)

Pisces II (Psc II) is an ultra-faint dwarf-spheroidal galaxy and satellite of the Milky Way, located in the constellation Pisces 180 kpc (587,081 light years) from Earth. Discovered in 2009 by public analysis of Data Release 7 (DR7) of the Sloan Digital Sky Survey, it is classified as a dwarf spheroidal galaxy (dSph) and is one of the smallest and faintest satellite galaxies of the Milky Way.

== Structure ==
Pisces II is a small irregular galaxy, with a moderately-aged and older stellar population of metal-poor stars, consisting primarily of stars formed about 10 billion years ago. The metallicity of these old stars is low, at −2.3 < [Fe/H] < −1.7, which means that the ratio of their mass that consists of heavy metals (Note: In astronomy and physical cosmology, unlike other physical sciences, "heavy metals" refers to all elements except hydrogen and helium.) is less than that of the Sun. Its luminosity is about 10,000 times that of the Sun (absolute magnitude of about −5), which corresponds to the luminosity of an average globular cluster.

== Potential past interactions ==
In 2016, follow-up work on Pisces II and Pegasus III highlighted that both lie relatively close to each other (within approximately 43 kiloparsecs), and share similar radial velocities in the Milky Way's rest frame. This suggests that these two satellite galaxies may actually be associated with one another, potentially having interacted in the past; however, further spectroscopic measurements are needed to confirm this.

== See also ==
- Satellite galaxies of the Milky Way
- Pisces VII, a dwarf satellite galaxy of the Triangulum galaxy
- Pisces A and Pisces B, two void dwarf galaxies in the Local Group
