= NGC 918 =

Barred spiral galaxy in the constellation Aries

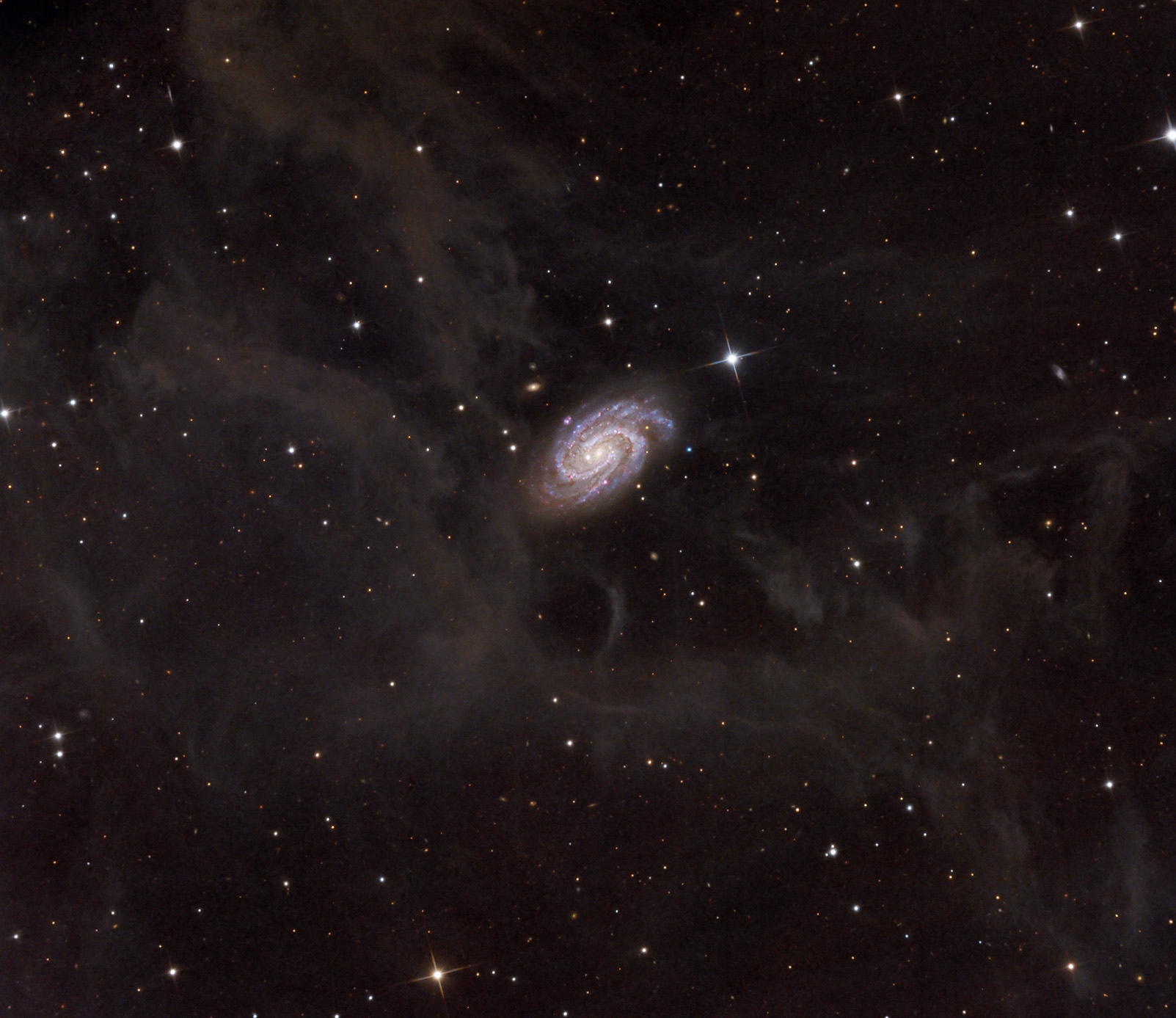
- NGC 918 by the Mount Lemmon SkyCenter

Observation data (J2000 epoch)
- Constellation: Aries
- Right ascension: 02^{h} 25^{m} 50.7648^{s}
- Declination: +18° 29′ 46.987″
- Redshift: 0.005037
- Heliocentric radial velocity: 1510 ± 1 km/s
- Distance: 20.6±1.5 mpc
- Apparent magnitude (V): 15.01
- Apparent magnitude (B): 16.0

Characteristics
- Type: SAB(rs)c
- Size: ~70,500 ly (21.63 kpc) (estimated)
- Apparent size (V): 3.5′ × 2.0′

Other designations
- IRAS 02230+1816, UGC 1888, MCG +03-07-011, PGC 9236, CGCG 462-011

NGC 918 is a barred spiral galaxy in the constellation Aries, about 67 million light years from the Milky Way. It was discovered by John Herschel on Jan 11, 1831.

The brightness class of NGC 918 is III and it has a broad line of neutral hydrogen. NGC 918 is also an active nucleus galaxy (AGN). Moreover, it is a field galaxy which does not belong to a cluster or group and is therefore gravitationally isolated.

Many non-redshift measures give a distance of 19,115 ± 6,160 Mpc (~62,3 million ly), which is within the distances calculated using the value shift.

== Supernovae ==
Two supernovae have been observed in NGC 918:

- SN 2009js (Type II, mag. 17.2) was discovered by Kōichi Itagaki and independently by the Lick Observatory Supernova Search (LOSS) on October 11, 2009. This was the first subluminous supernova to be studied in infrared wavelengths.
- SN 2011ek (Type Ia, mag. 16.4) was discovered by Kōichi Itagaki on Aug. 4, 2011.

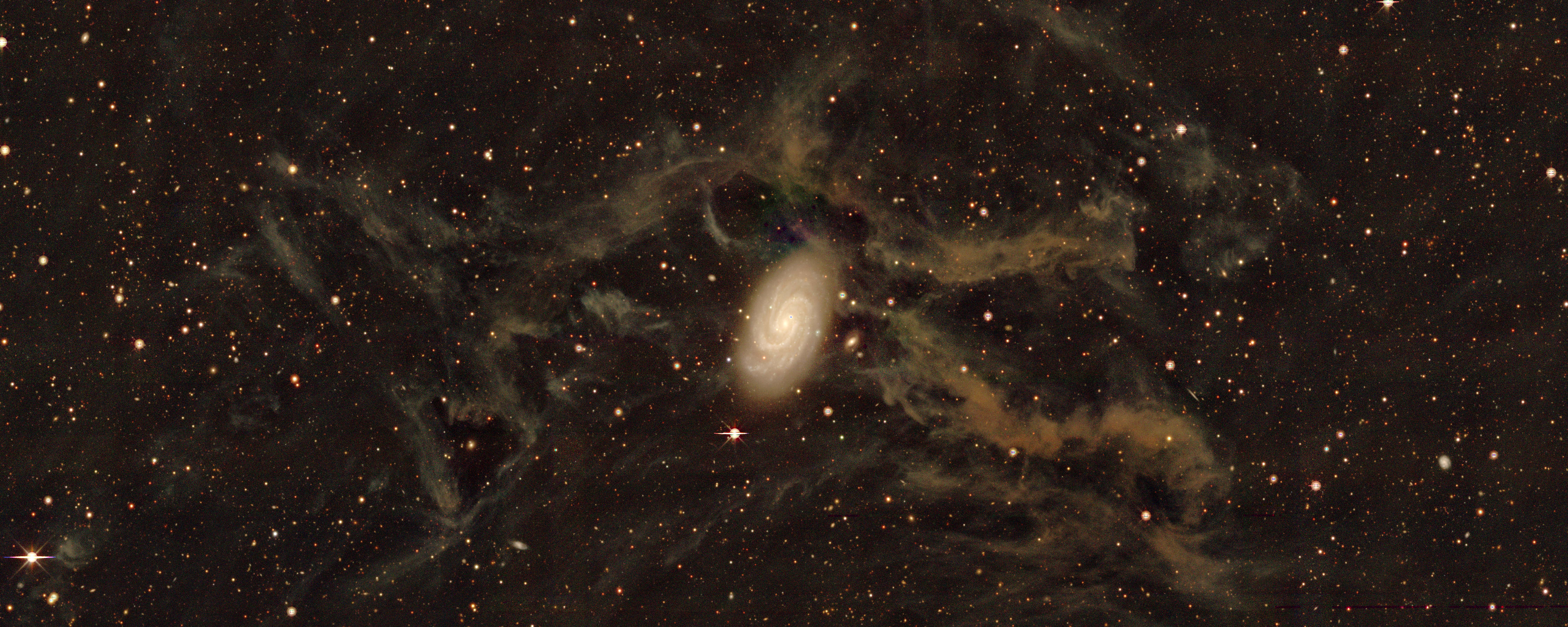
NGC 918 and dust clouds within our Milky Way with the 10th data release of the Legacy Survey.

== See also ==
- List of NGC objects (1–1000)
