= NGC 6308 =

Galaxy in the constellation Hercules

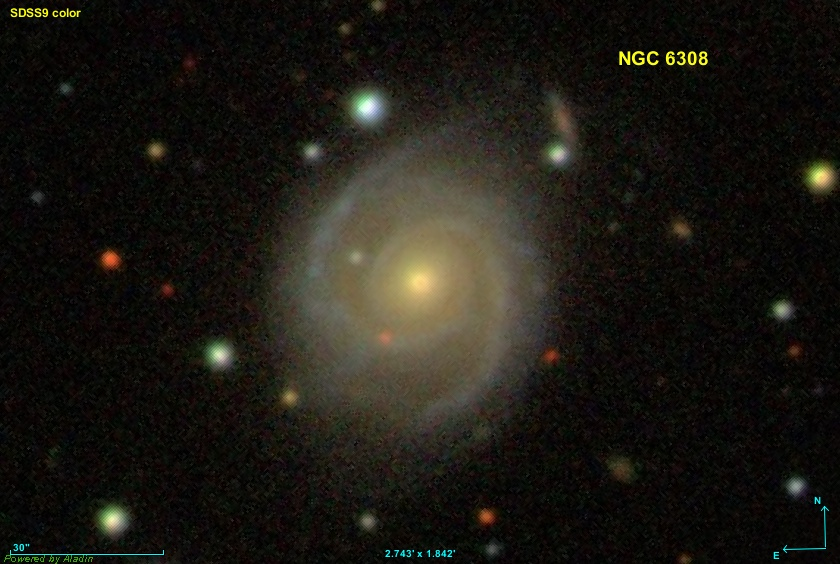
- NGC 6308 imaged by SDSS

Observation data (J2000 epoch)
- Constellation: Hercules
- Right ascension: 17^{h} 11^{m} 59.6895^{s}
- Declination: +23° 22′ 48.37″
- Redshift: 0.029402
- Heliocentric radial velocity: 8814 ± 3 km/s
- Distance: 423.2 ± 29.6 Mly (129.74 ± 9.08 Mpc)
- Apparent magnitude (V): 13.4

Characteristics
- Type: SAB(rs)c?
- Size: ~198,600 ly (60.89 kpc) (estimated)
- Apparent size (V): 1.1′ × 1.0′

Other designations
- IRAS 17099+2326, 2MASX J17115972+2322483, UGC 10747, MCG +04-40-021, PGC 59807, CGCG 139-043

NGC 6308 is a large intermediate spiral galaxy in the constellation of Hercules. Its velocity with respect to the cosmic microwave background is 8797 ± 3 km/s, which corresponds to a Hubble distance of 129.74 ± 9.08 Mpc (~423 million light-years). It was discovered by German astronomer Albert Marth on 6 June 1863.

NGC 6308 has been identified as field galaxy, i.e. it does not belong to a cluster or group.

One supernova has been observed in NGC 6308: SN 2023oyz (Type Ic, mag. 20.4214) was discovered by the Zwicky Transient Facility on 9 August 2023.

== See also ==
- List of NGC objects (6001–7000)
