= NGC 2903 =

Spiral galaxy in the constellation Leo

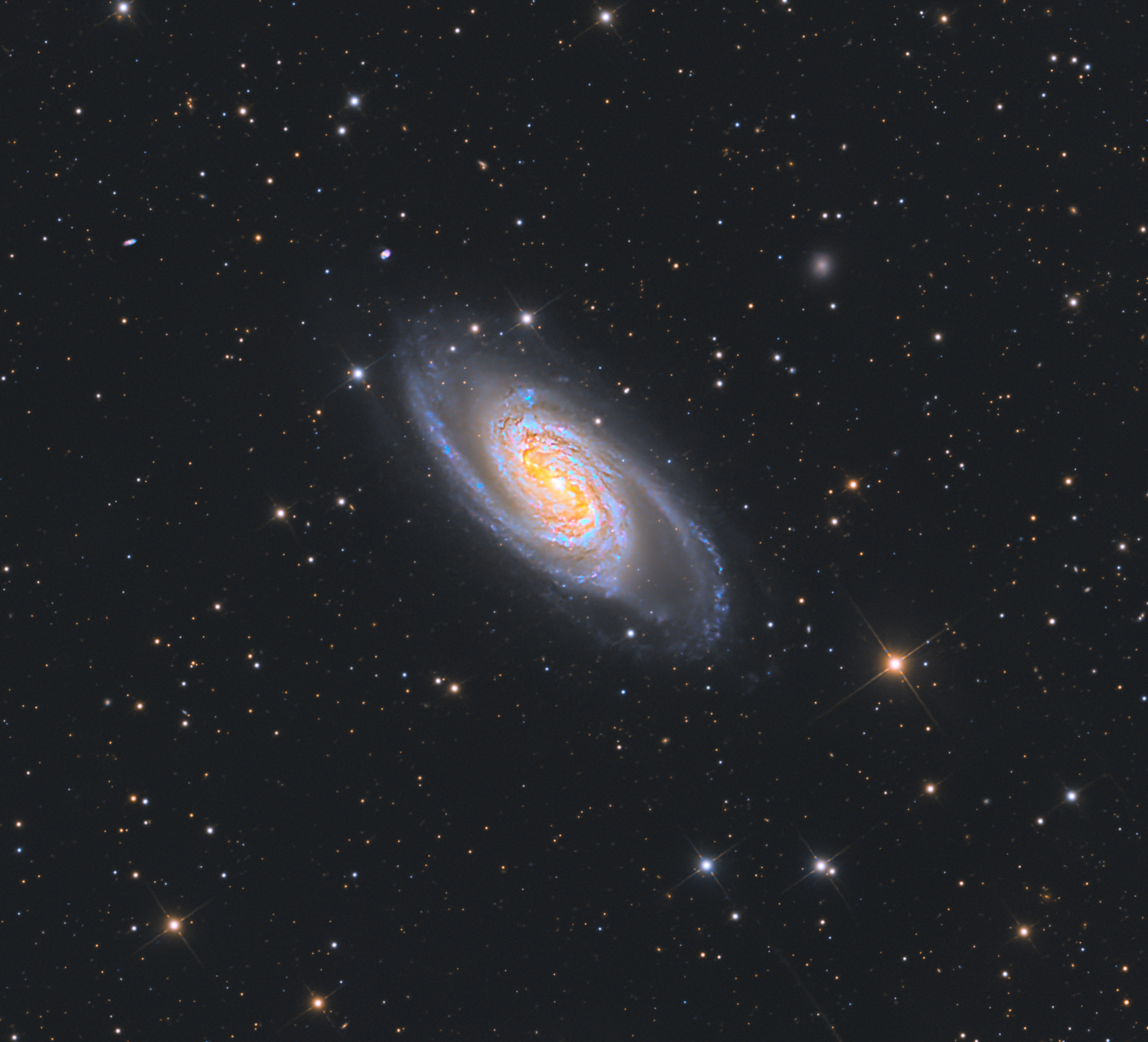
- A natural color picture of NGC 2903 captured in 2026

Observation data (J2000 epoch)
- Constellation: Leo
- Right ascension: 09^{h} 32^{m} 10.111^{s}
- Declination: +21° 30′ 02.99″
- Redshift: 556±1 km/s
- Distance: 30.4 Mly (9.33 Mpc)
- Group or cluster: Virgo Supercluster
- Apparent magnitude (V): 9.0

Characteristics
- Type: SBbc or SAB(rs)bc
- Size: 100,800 ly (30.91 kpc) (diameter; D_{25} isophote)
- Apparent size (V): 11.48′ × 5.25′

Other designations
- IRAS 09293+2143, 2MASX J09321011+2130029, UGC 5079, MCG +04-23-009, PGC 27077, CGCG 122-014

NGC 2903 is an isolated barred spiral galaxy in the equatorial constellation of Leo, positioned about 1.5° due south of Lambda Leonis. It was discovered by German-born astronomer William Herschel, who cataloged it on November 16, 1784. He mistook it as a double nebula, as did subsequent observers, and it wasn't until the nineteenth century that the Third Earl of Rosse resolved into a spiral form. J. L. E. Dreyer assigned it the identifiers 2903 and 2905 in his New General Catalogue; NGC 2905 now designates a luminous knot in the northeastern spiral arm.

This field galaxy is located about 30 million light-years away from the Milky Way, and is a member of the Virgo Supercluster. The morphological classification of this galaxy is SBbc, indicating a barred spiral (SB) with moderate to tightly-wound spiral arms (bc). De Vaucouleurs and associates assigned it the class SAB(rs)bc, suggesting a weaker bar structure (SAB) with a partial ring (rs). The bar structure appears stronger in the near infrared band. The galaxy as a whole is inclined by an angle of 60° to the line of sight from the Earth.

72% of the stellar mass is located in the outer disk of the galaxy, and 20% is found in the bar. The bulge adds 5% of the stellar mass, and its star population is generally older. However, the central ~650 pc radius volume of the core is a strong starburst region. The star formation rate here is 0.7 M_{☉} y^{−1} and it is being fed by gas inflow along the bar. There is no evidence of an active nucleus.

The irregular dwarf galaxy KKH 51 appears to be a companion, as they have an angular separation of 25′ and nearly the same radial velocity.
