= Local Volume =

Collection of more than 1,500 galaxies

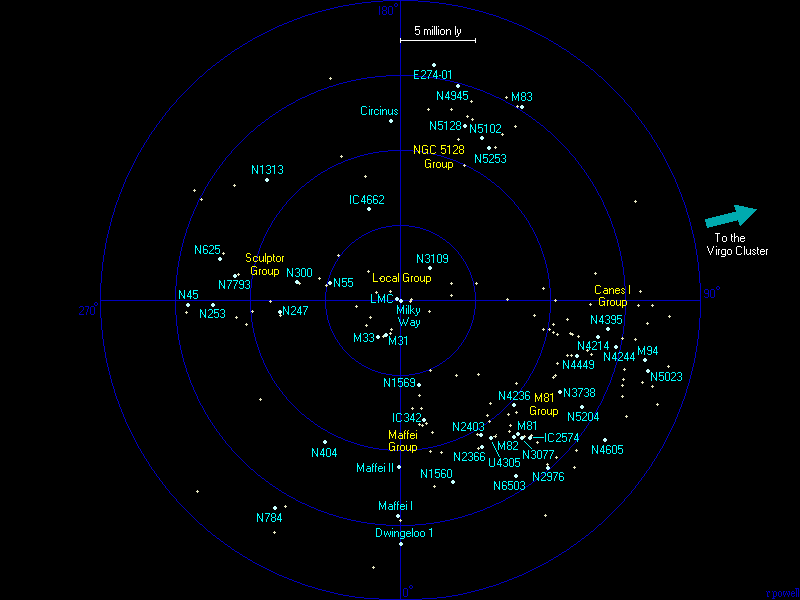
- Partial representation of the Local Volume (the scale at the top represents 5 million light-years).

Observation data (Epoch J2000)
- Number of galaxies: 1,500
- Parent structure: Virgo Supercluster
- Major axis: 78.3 Mly (24 Mpc)

The Local Volume (LV) is a collection of more than 1,500 galaxies, within a spherical region centred on the Local Group with a radius of 12 megaparsecs from Earth or up to a radial velocity of redshift of z < 0.002 (550 km/s).

It was in this region of the universe where the Local Volume Legacy (LVL) project took place for the study of 258 galaxies through cycles of observations made by the Spitzer Space Telescope using the Infrared Array Camera (IRAC) and the Multiband Imaging Photometer (MIPS).

This Local Volume study included all galaxies within a 3.5 megaparsec subvolume and a collection of spiral and irregular galaxies within 11 megaparsecs. The goals of the study were to collect data on the rate of star formation, stellar mass in old star populations, cosmic dust, and starlight interference.

We can also define the Local Volume by the distance of 10 Mpc over which the Hubble Space Telescope can distinguish stellar populations in galaxies. This definition can be extended to 15 Mpc to cover the full range of galaxy environments, from voids to clusters and massive clusters. In the future, it should be possible to extend our definition of the Local Volume to even greater distances.

Within the Local Volume is the Local Sheet, a filament and area of flattened space containing about 60 galaxies that share the same velocity and is about 5 megaparsecs in radius and about 0.5 megaparsecs thick. The Local Group, of which the Milky Way and the Andromeda galaxy are part, is part of the Local Sheet and therefore, of the Local Volume. The Local Volume, in turn, is included in the Virgo Supercluster and the larger Laniakea Supercluster.

Local Volume galaxies have a preferred movement called virgocentric flow, towards the Virgo cluster, caused by its overwhelming gravity.

Among the member galaxies of the Local Volume, there are several large galaxies or particular galaxies such as Centaurus A, the Bode galaxy (M81), the Cigar galaxy (M82), the Circinus galaxy, the Southern Pinwheel galaxy (M83), the Pinwheel galaxy (M101), the Sombrero Galaxy (M104), NGC 1512, M51, M74, M66 and M96.

Recently, following Hubble Space Telescope observations, two dwarf galaxies, Pisces A and Pisces B, have been identified as having migrated into the Local Volume from the neighboring Local Void.

== See also ==
- Pisces–Cetus Supercluster Complex
- Observable universe
