= NGC 5144 =

Galaxy in the constellation Ursa Minor

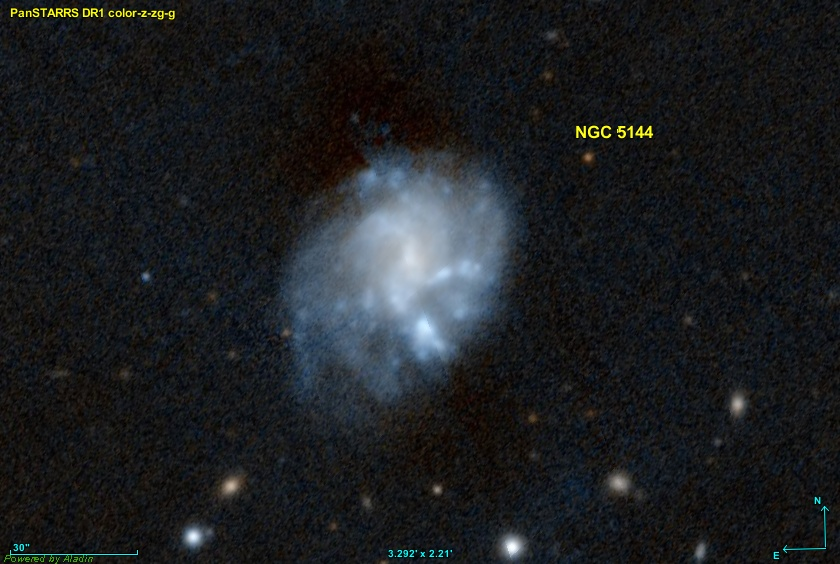
- Pan-STARRS image of NGC 5144

Observation data (J2000 epoch)
- Constellation: Ursa Minor
- Right ascension: 13^{h} 23^{m} 07^{s}
- Declination: 70° 27′ 43″
- Redshift: 0.010477
- Distance: 154 Mly (47.22 Mpc)
- Apparent magnitude (V): 13.1
- Apparent magnitude (B): 13.4

Characteristics
- Type: SAc pec
- Size: 64,500 ly (estimated 19.78 kpc)
- Apparent size (V): 1.2' x 0.8'

Other designations
- UGC 8420, PGC 46742, MRK 256, KUG 1321+707, MCG +12-13-005

NGC 5144 is an unbarred spiral galaxy in the constellation of Ursa Minor. It has a velocity of 3,202 ± 9 km/s corresponding to a Hubble Distance of 47.2 ± 3.3 megaparsecs (154 million light-years). It was discovered by William Herschel in May 1791. It is a possible field galaxy which does not belong to a group or cluster.

NGC 5144 is also a starburst galaxy and classified as a Markarian galaxy (designated as MRK 256), since its core emits large amounts of ultraviolet light.
