= NGC 6789 =

Irregular galaxy in the constellation Draco

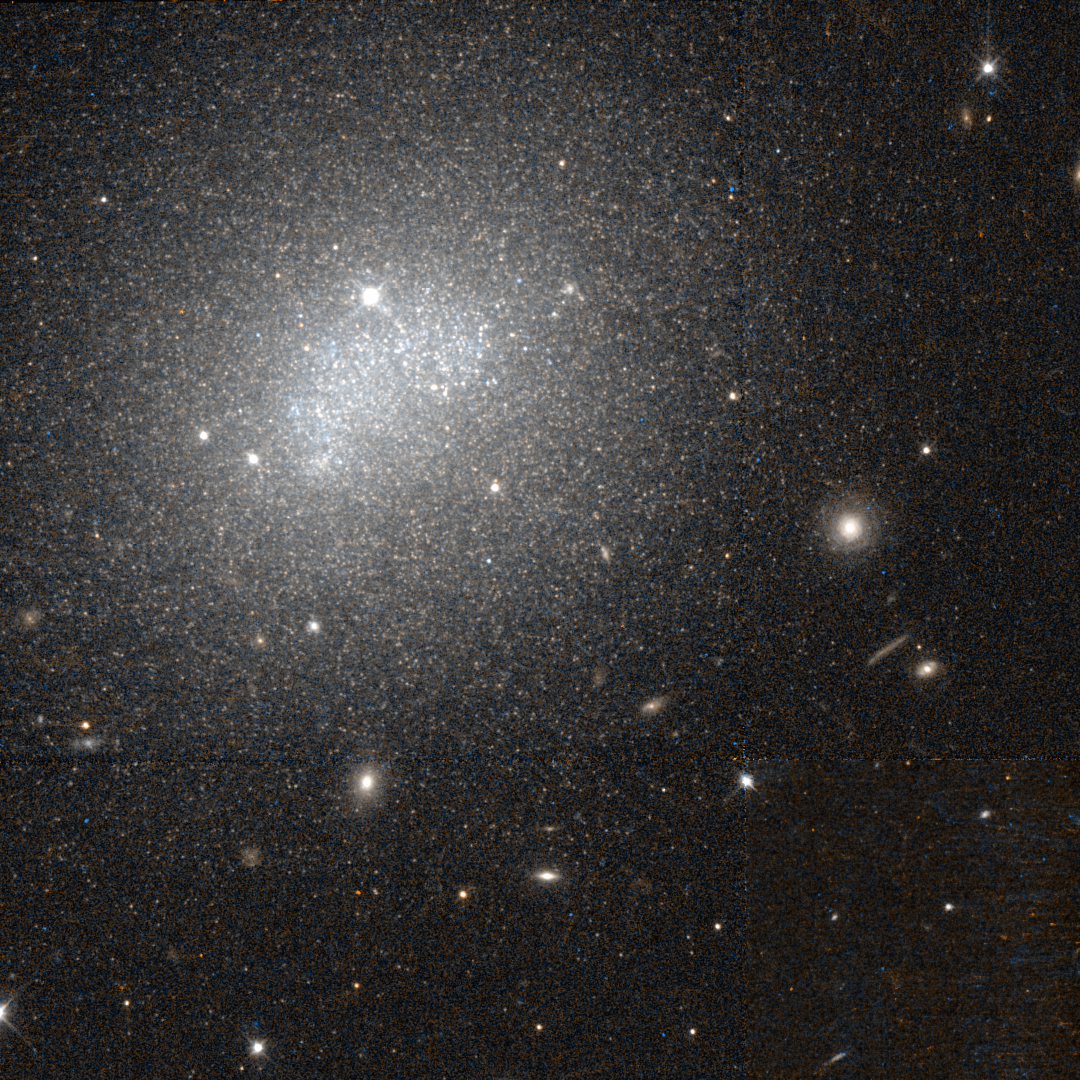
- Hubble Space Telescope image of NGC 6789

Observation data (J2000 epoch)
- Constellation: Draco
- Right ascension: 19^{h} 16^{m} 41^{s}
- Declination: +63° 58′ 23″
- Redshift: −0.000470
- Heliocentric radial velocity: −141 ± 9 km/s
- Distance: 12 Mly (3.6 Mpc)
- Apparent magnitude (B): 13.76

Characteristics
- Type: Im

Other designations
- NGC 6789,MCG+11-23-001, LEDA 63000

NGC 6789 is a void irregular galaxy in the constellation Draco. It was discovered by Lewis Swift on August 30, 1883. It is located within the Local Void, a region of space with far fewer galaxies than its surroundings.

NGC 6789 is the nearest blue compact dwarf (BCD) galaxy to the Milky Way. It is chemically homogeneous and relatively metal-poor.

NGC 6789 has attracted attention because it shows recent central star formation despite its extreme isolation.

== See also ==
- List of NGC objects (6001–7000)
