= MCG +01-02-015 =

Spiral galaxy in the constellation of Pisces

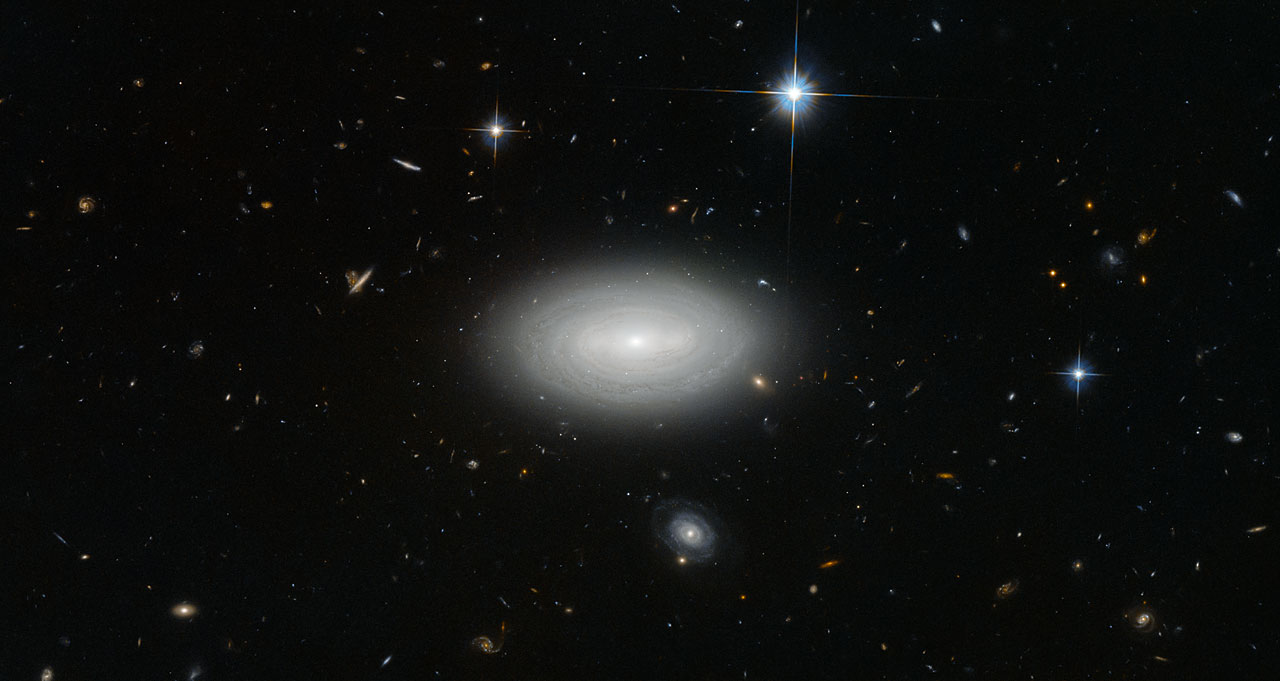
- Hubble Space Telescope image of MCG +01-02-015

Observation data (J2000 epoch)
- Constellation: Pisces
- Right ascension: 00^{h} 30^{m} 28^{s}
- Declination: +05° 51′ 40″
- Redshift: 0.023640
- Heliocentric radial velocity: 7087 ± 18 km/s
- Distance: 293 Mly (89.9 Mpc)
- Apparent magnitude (B): 15.2

Characteristics
- Type: SB

Other designations
- LEDA 1852, CGCG 409-021, 2MASX J00302865+0551405, UZC J003028.7+055140

MCG +01-02-015 is a spiral galaxy in the constellation Pisces. It is an example of a void galaxy, and believed to be one of the most isolated galaxies known, with no other galaxies for around 100 million light-years in all directions. It is located in the 0049+05 void which is next to the Pisces-Cetus void.

== Observational history ==
MCG +01-02-015 was previously classified as an elliptical galaxy of class E2. Higher-resolution imaging has revealed it to be a barred spiral galaxy.

== Formation ==
It is theorized by many astrophysicists that void galaxies are the result of very large galactic filaments being pulled on by the gravity of a neighboring super cluster out of the less densely populated areas. Galaxies such as MCG+01-02-015 are left behind by events such as these.
