= NGC 1313 =

Galaxy in the constellation Reticulum

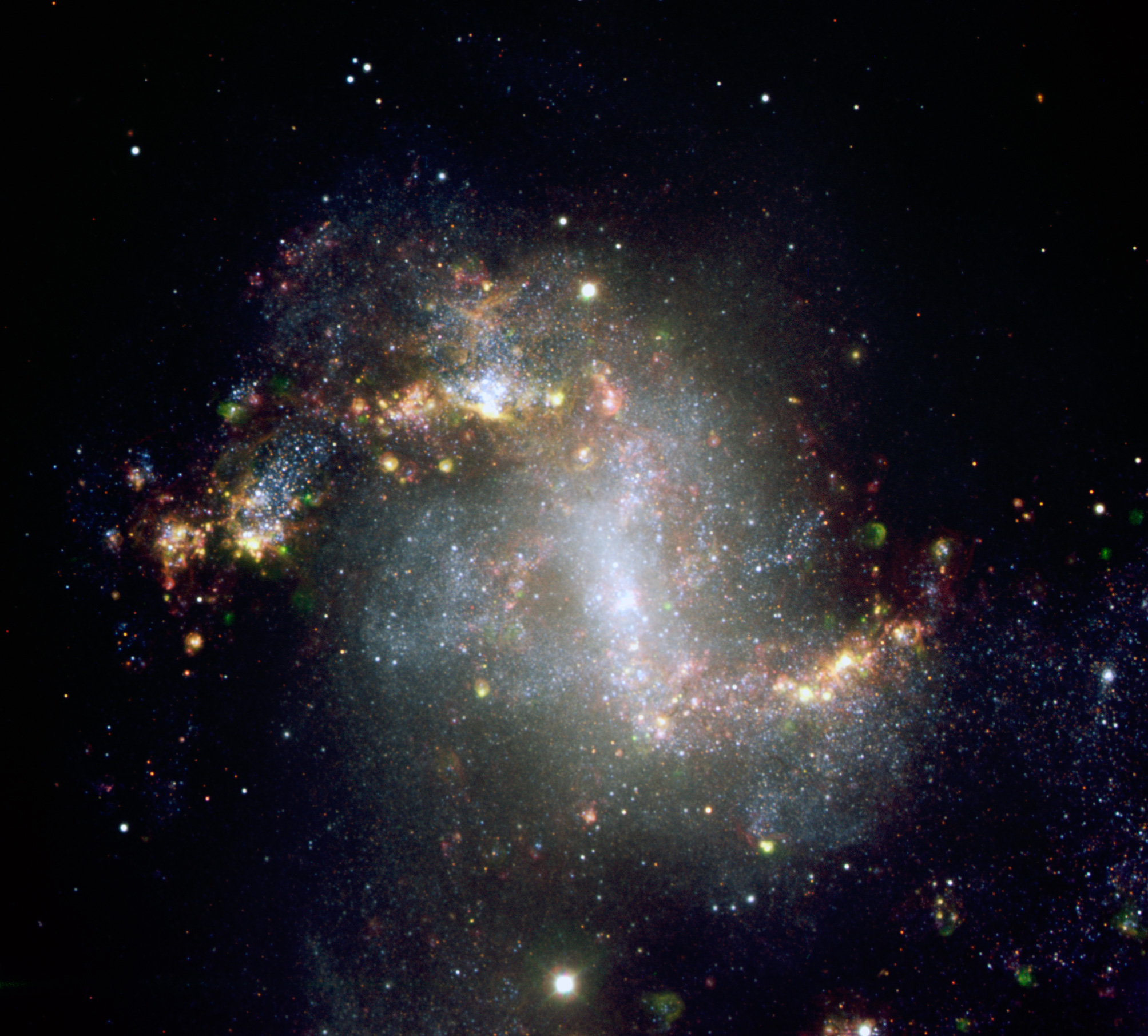
- A Very Large Telescope (VLT) image of NGC 1313. Credit: ESO.

Observation data (J2000.0 epoch)
- Constellation: Reticulum
- Right ascension: 03^{h} 18^{m} 15.4^{s}
- Declination: −66° 29′ 50″
- Redshift: 0.001568
- Distance: 12.886 Mly (3.951 Mpc)

Characteristics
- Type: SB(s)d
- Apparent size (V): 9.1 Arcminute × 7.1 Arcminute

Other designations
- Topsy Turvy Galaxy, PGC 12286, ESO 082- G 011

NGC 1313 is a field galaxy and an irregular galaxy in the southern constellation of Reticulum. Alternatively, it is known as the Topsy Turvy Galaxy. It was discovered by the Scottish astronomer James Dunlop on 27 September 1826. NGC 1313 lies within the Virgo Supercluster at an estimated distance of 12.9 million light-years (4.0 Mpc)

NGC 1313 has a diameter of about 50,000 light-years, or about half the size of the Milky Way. It has a strikingly uneven shape and its axis of rotation is not exactly in its centre. NGC 1313 also shows strong starburst activity and associated supershells. NGC 1313 is dominated by scattered patches of intense star formation, which gives the galaxy a rather ragged appearance. The uneven shape, the ragged appearance and the strong starburst can all be explained by a galactic collision in the past. However, NGC 1313 seems to be an isolated galaxy and has no direct neighbours. Therefore, it is not clear whether it has swallowed a small companion in its past.

Young, blue stars are scattered across the galaxy. This is evidence of infant mortality in which the young open clusters quickly became gravitationally "unglued", scattering their resident stars into the galaxy. The galaxy bears some resemblance to the Magellanic Clouds.

== Features ==
The galaxy hosts two ultraluminous X-ray sources, called NGC 1313 X-1 and X-2. The former is a rare intermediate-mass black hole.

In 2007, a rare WO star was discovered in NGC 1313, currently known by its only designation of [HC2007] 31. It is of spectral type WO3. The derived absolute magnitude is about -5, which is very high for a single WO star. (WOs usually have absolute magnitudes of about -1 to -4) This means that the WO is likely part of a binary or a small stellar association.

Two supernovae have been observed in NGC 1313:

- SN 1962M (Type II, mag. 11.7) was discovered by José Sérsic on 26 November 1962.
- SN 1978K (Type IIn, mag. 16) was discovered by Stuart Ryder in January 1990 and originally reported as a nova. However, a search of archival photographs revealed an outburst on 31 July 1978, and all data indicated that it was a very unusual Type II supernova.
