= NGC 2188 =

Galaxy in the constellation Columba

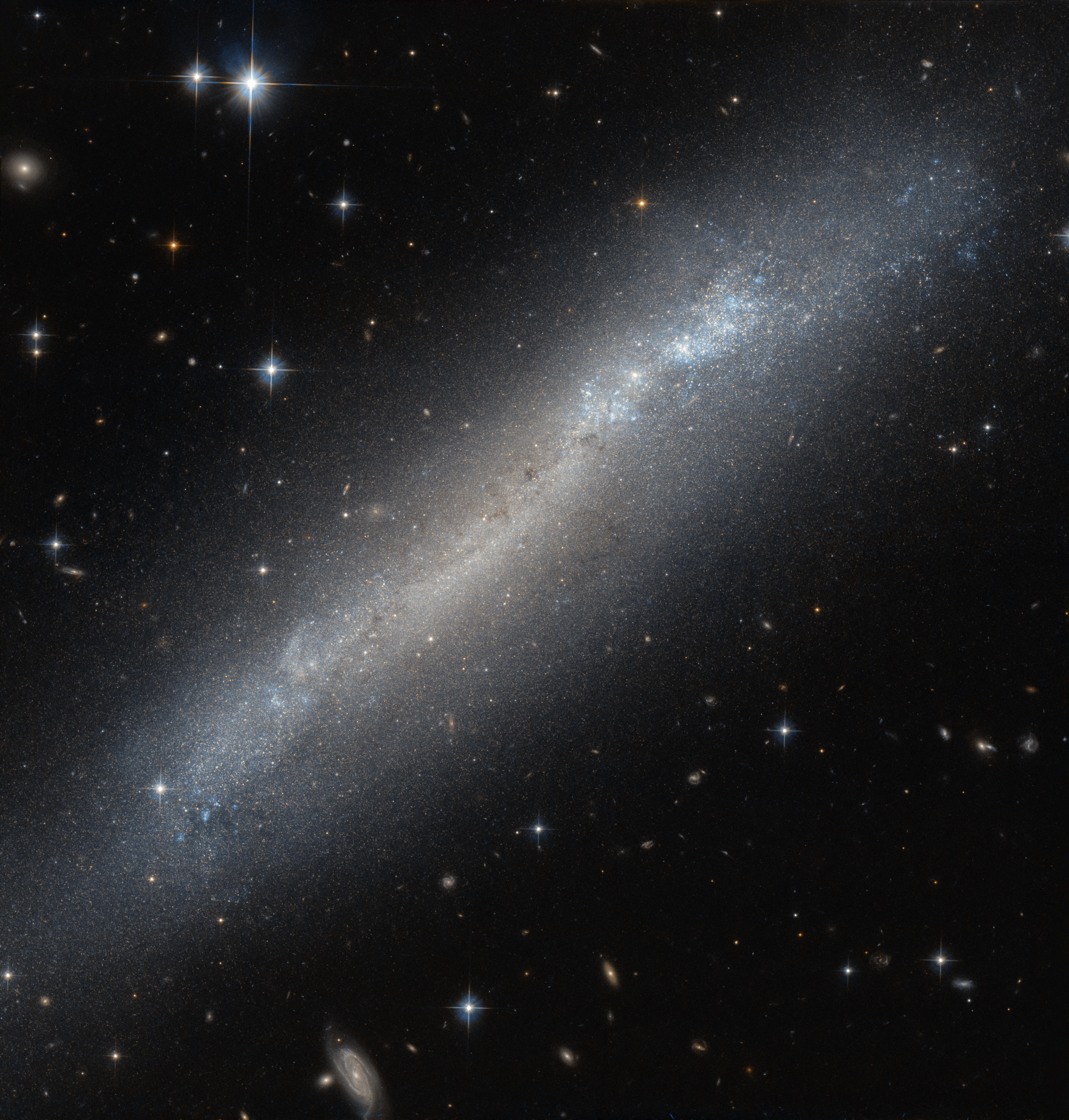
- Hubble Space Telescope (HST) image of the galaxy

Observation data (J2000 epoch)
- Constellation: Columba
- Right ascension: 06^{h} 10^{m} 09.5^{s}
- Declination: −34° 06′ 22″
- Redshift: 0.002492 ± 0.000013
- Heliocentric radial velocity: 747 ± 4 km/s
- Distance: 23.9 ± 10 Mly (7.3 ± 3.1 Mpc)
- Apparent magnitude (V): 11.5

Characteristics
- Type: SB(s)m
- Apparent size (V): 4.4′ × 1.1′

Other designations
- ESO 364-G037, AM 0608-340, MCG -06-14-008, PGC 18536

NGC 2188 is a barred spiral galaxy in the constellation Columba. It lies approximately 25 million light years from Earth. Based on its apparent size and distance, the galaxy is estimated to span about 50,000 light-years in length. It was discovered by British Astronomer John Herschel on January 9, 1836.

NGC 2188 is observed nearly edge-on from Earth, with its central bulge and spiral arms tilted away from the line of sight. As a result, only the thin outer edge of its galactic disc is visible. The true morphology of the galaxy has been determined through analyses of stellar distribution in the bulge and disc, as well as studies of stellar colors. The galaxy is close enough that its stars can be resolved. The brightest of them have an apparent magnitude of about 21.

Observations in neutral hydrogen HI, the galaxy appears asymmetrical structure, which may suggest a recent galactic interaction. The hydrogen gas is more abundant in one end of the galaxy and extends over 4 kpc away from the galactic plane. Other features visible are some filaments and a superbubble with a diameter of 15 arcseconds. These filaments have been associated with a HII region located in the galactic halo. The total hydrogen mass of the galaxy is estimated to be 3×10^{8} M_{☉}, while it is of low metallicity.

NGC 2188 has been found to have three smaller companions, HIPASS J0607-34, ESO364-029, and KK 55.
