= NGC 2683 =

Galaxy in the constellation Lynx

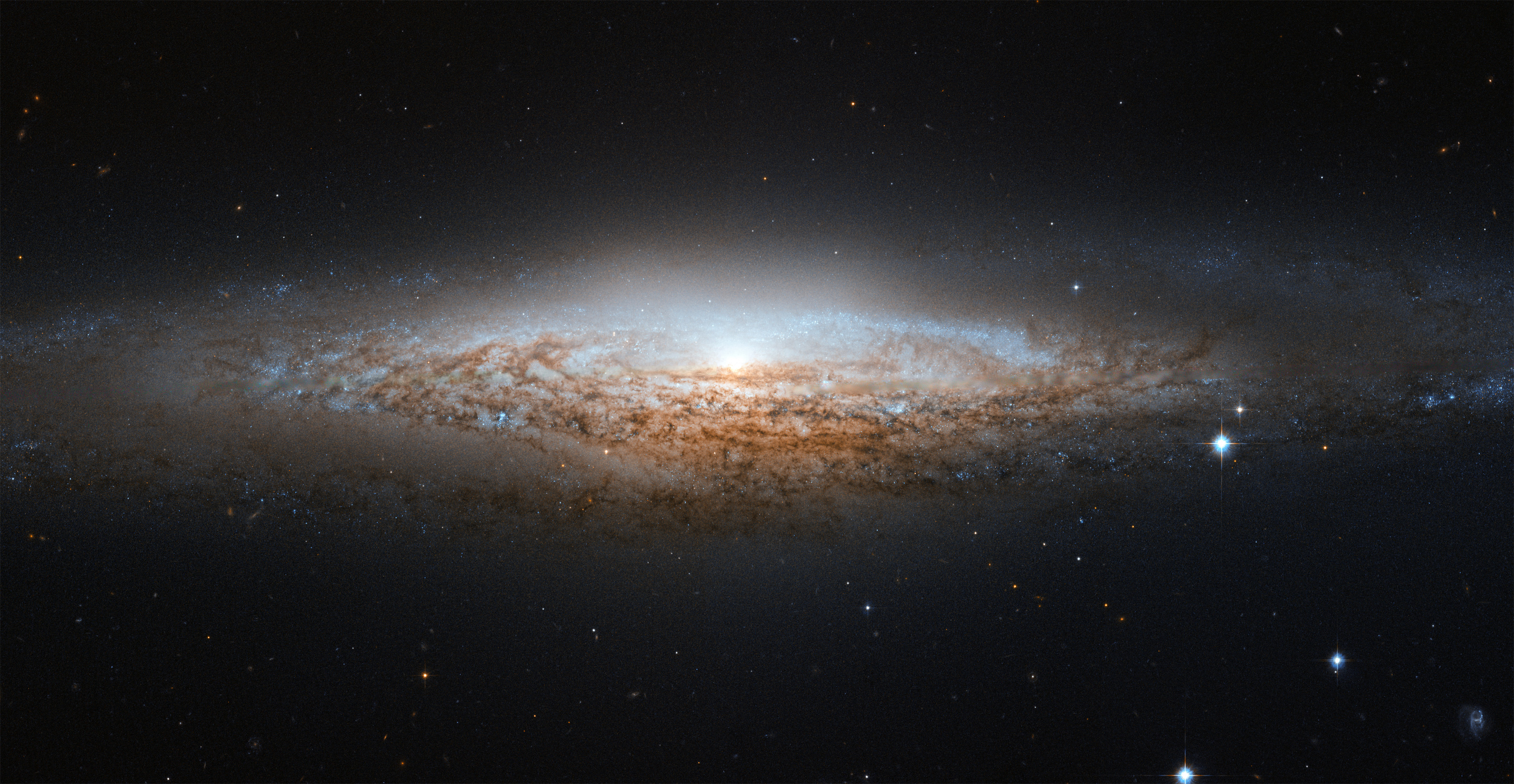
- NGC 2683, as taken by Hubble Space Telescope

Observation data (J2000 epoch)
- Constellation: Lynx
- Right ascension: 08^{h} 52^{m} 41.3^{s}
- Declination: +33° 25′ 19″
- Redshift: 411±1 km/s
- Distance: 30.53 ± 0.91 Mly (9.36 ± 0.28 Mpc)
- Apparent magnitude (V): 9.7

Characteristics
- Type: SA(rs)b
- Size: 122 kly (37.5 kpc)
- Apparent size (V): 9.3′ × 2.1′

Other designations
- NGC 2683, UGC 4641, PGC 24930

NGC 2683 is a field spiral galaxy in the northern constellation of Lynx. It was nicknamed the "UFO Galaxy" by the Astronaut Memorial Planetarium and Observatory. It was discovered by the astronomer William Herschel on February 5, 1788.

It is viewed nearly edge-on from Earth's location in space and is located about 30 million light-years away, although previous estimates also give distances between 16 and 25 million light-years.

NGC 2683 is receding from Earth at 410 km/s (250 mi/s), and from the Galactic Center at 375 km/s (233 mi/s).

== Visibility ==
The reddened light from the center of the galaxy appears yellowish due to the intervening gas and dust located within the outer arms of NGC 2683. Its apparent magnitude is 10.6 making it not visible to the human eye without the aid of a small telescope.

== Characteristics ==
While usually considered an unbarred spiral galaxy, recent research suggests it may in fact be a barred spiral galaxy; its bar is hard to see due to its high inclination. Further support for the presence of a bar stems from the X-shaped structure seen near its centre, which is thought to be associated with a buckling instability of a stellar bar.

It is also both smaller and less luminous than the Milky Way with very little neutral hydrogen or molecular hydrogen and a low luminosity in the infrared, which suggests a currently low rate of star formation.

NGC 2683 is rich in globular clusters, hosting about 300 of them, twice the number found in the Milky Way. Due to its vast distance and complexity (due to the association of globular clusters bound to it), NGC 2638's mass has not been calculated as accurately as it could be. Otherwise its volume and vector motions are reasonably well known and characterized.

Several satellite galaxies are known in the vicinity of NGC 2683. The largest is KK 69, with a Holmberg diameter of 12,000 light-years (3.7 kiloparsecs). It is a dwarf transitional galaxy, with properties intermediate between those of dwarf irregular galaxies and dwarf spheroidal galaxies. Another is KK 70, which is about half the diameter of KK 69. Two additional dwarf galaxies are assumed to be satellites: they are N2683dw1 and N2683dw2, which are dwarf irregular and dwarf spheroidal galaxies, respectively.

== Gallery ==
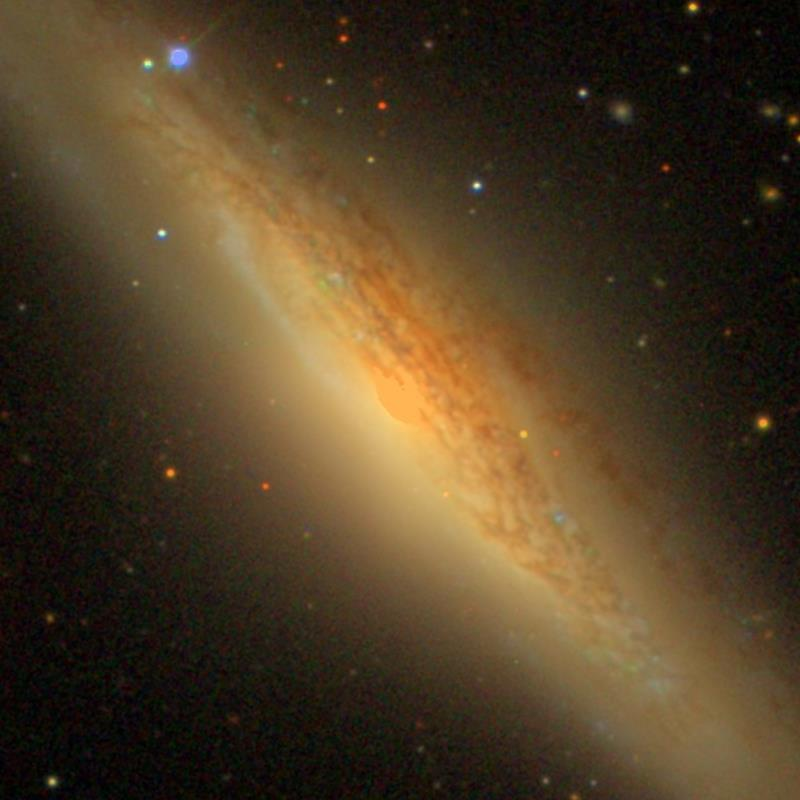
SDSS image of NGC 2683

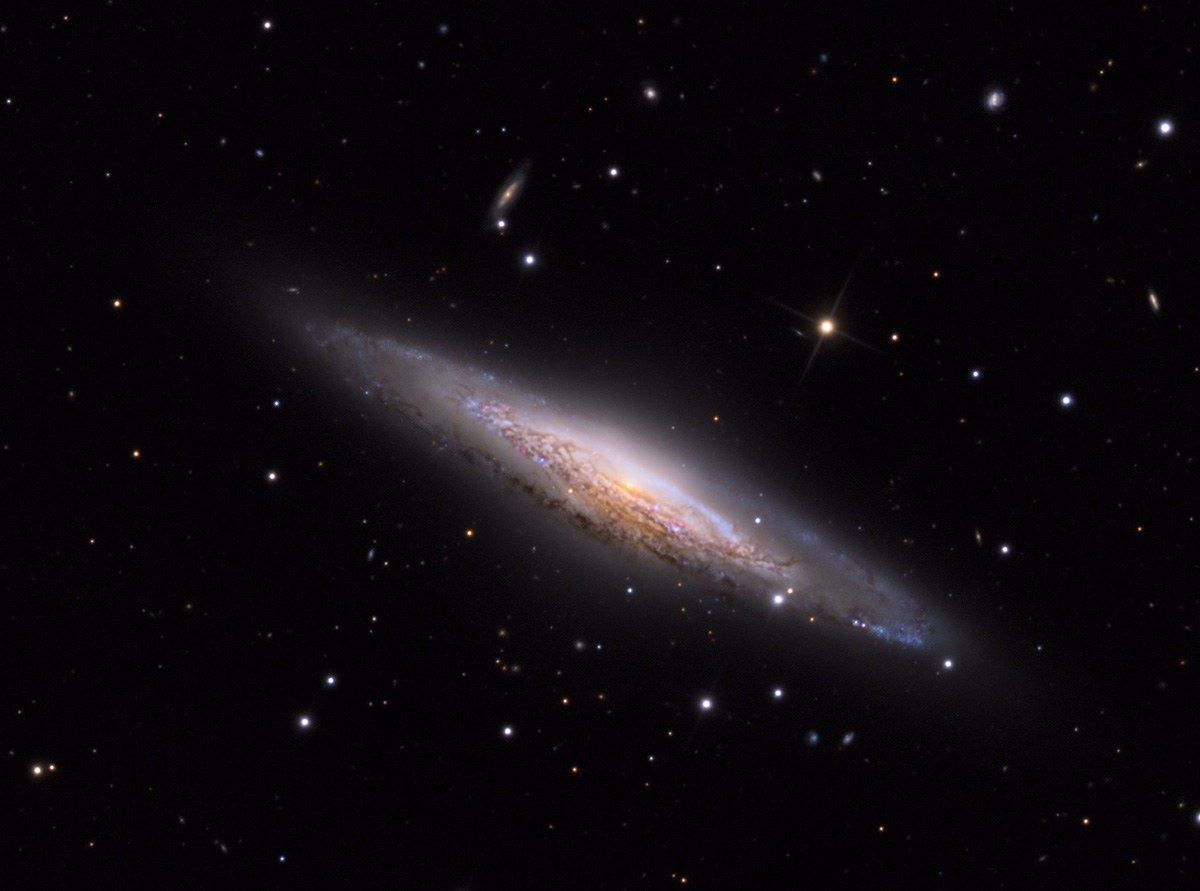
NGC 2683 imaged by the Mount Lemmon Observatory

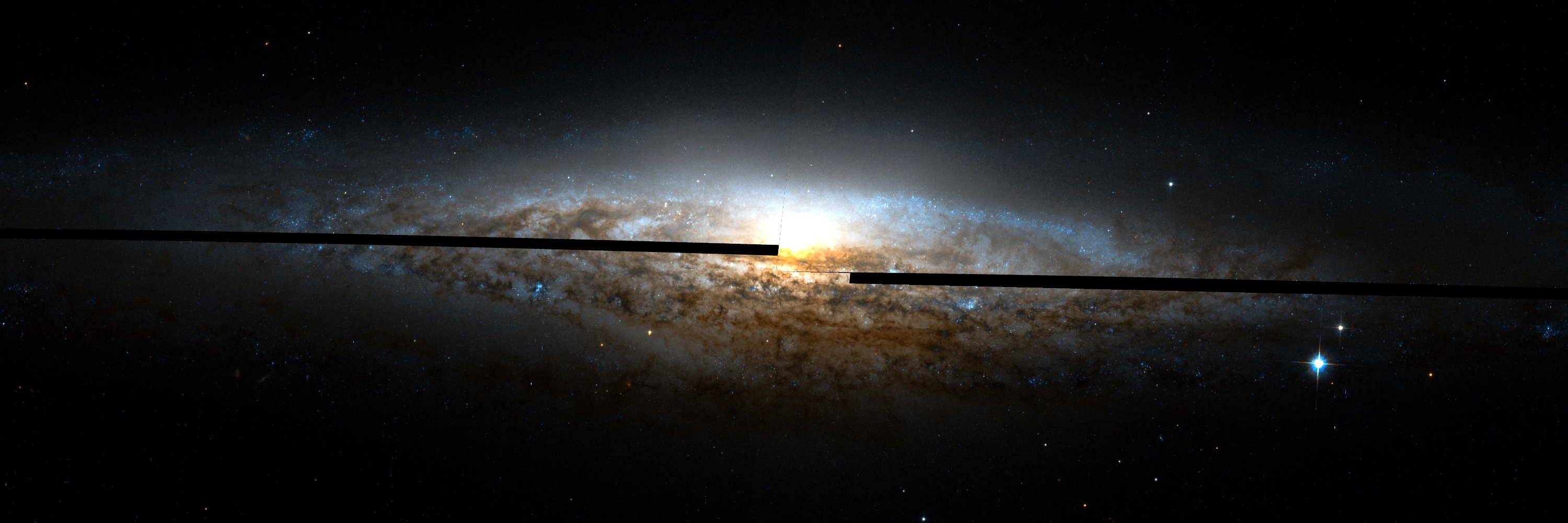
NGC 2683 mosaic by Hubble Space Telescope 6’x2’ view
