= Void galaxy =

Galaxy found in a cosmological void

A void galaxy is a galaxy located in a cosmological void. Few galaxies exist in voids; most are located in sheets, walls and filaments that surround voids and supervoids. Many void galaxies are connected through void filaments or tendrils, less massive versions of the regular galaxy filaments that surround voids. These filaments are often straighter than their non-void counterparts due to the lack of influence by surrounding filaments. These filaments can even be rich enough to form poor galaxy clusters. The void galaxies themselves are thought to represent pristine examples of galactic evolution, having few neighbours, and likely to have formed from pure intergalactic gas.

== Formation ==
It is theorised by many astrophysicists that void galaxies are the result of large galactic filaments being pulled by the gravity of a major super cluster out of the less densely populated areas, causing voids such as the Boötes Void to grow. Galaxies such as the spiral galaxy MCG+01-02-015 are sometimes left behind from such events.

== List of void galaxies ==
Galaxy	Picture	Void	Filament	Notes	Comments
Pisces A		Local Void			
Pisces B		Local Void			
NGC 7077		Local Void			
NGC 6503		Local Void			
NGC 6789		Local Void			
MCG +01-02-015		0049+05 Void			LEDA 1852 (Pisces)
LEDA 3096313		Boötes Void			Emission-line galaxy
LEDA 84225		Boötes Void			AGN X-ray source
LEDA 87383		Boötes Void			Starburst galaxy
LEDA 2790865		Boötes Void			LINER galaxy, Emission-line Galaxy
LEDA 87386		Boötes Void			Starburst galaxy
LEDA 87385		Boötes Void			Interacting galaxy pair
LEDA 101388		Boötes Void			Seyfert 2 galaxy
LEDA 101389		Boötes Void			Elliptical galaxy
LEDA 100709		Boötes Void			Starburst galaxy
LEDA 54705		Boötes Void			Interacting galaxy pair
MCG +09-25-043		Boötes Void			AGN X-ray source
Markarian 845		Boötes Void			Seyfert 1 (X-ray source)
LEDA 87384		Boötes Void			Emission-line Galaxy
LEDA 2103063		Boötes Void			Emission-line Galaxy
LEDA 1147360					Active galaxy nucleus candidate
SDSS J123644.69+003348.1					Active galaxy nucleus candidate
LEDA 1166549					HII galaxy
2dFGRS TGN266Z051					Seyfert 1
2MASX J12401820-0011064					Seyfert 1
LEDA 1160233					Active galaxy nucleus candidate
LEDA 1161018					
LEDA 1186186					Active galaxy nucleus candidate
LEDA 1110510					Active galaxy nucleus candidate
MCG +00-25-010					Seyfert 1
GAMA 279943					Active galaxy nucleus candidate
LEDA 2653526					Active galaxy nucleus candidate
SHOC 239					HII galaxy
LEDA 2790881					Seyfert 1
MaNGA 43-22					Active galaxy nucleus candidate
LEDA 29070					Active galaxy nucleus candidate
LEDA 28747					Active galaxy nucleus candidate
LEDA 2534153					Active galaxy nucleus candidate
MCG +10-15-008					Active galaxy nucleus candidate
Markarian 234					HII galaxy, Active galaxy nucleus candidate
LEDA 2677771					Seyfert 1
LEDA 3129299					Active galaxy nucleus candidate
LEDA 3132190					HII galaxy
NSA 12777					Seyfert 1
LEDA 2675385					Active galaxy nucleus candidate
SHOC 306					HII galaxy
ASK 047216.0					Active galaxy nucleus candidate
Markarian 89					Seyfert 1
SHOC 461					HII galaxy
LEDA 2678872					HII galaxy, Seyfert 1
NSA 12860					Active galaxy nucleus candidate
LEDA 3139336					
LEDA 2815866					Emission-line Galaxy
LEDA 2690461					Active galaxy nucleus candidate
Z 19-3					Active galaxy nucleus candidate
LEDA 4006977					
LEDA 1206223					Active galaxy nucleus candidate
NSA 14156					
LEDA 1214845					Active galaxy nucleus candidate
LEDA 1223466					Active galaxy nucleus candidate
KK 242					satellite galaxy of NGC 6503

== See also ==
- Field galaxy
