= Pisces B =

Void dwarf galaxy in the constellation Pisces

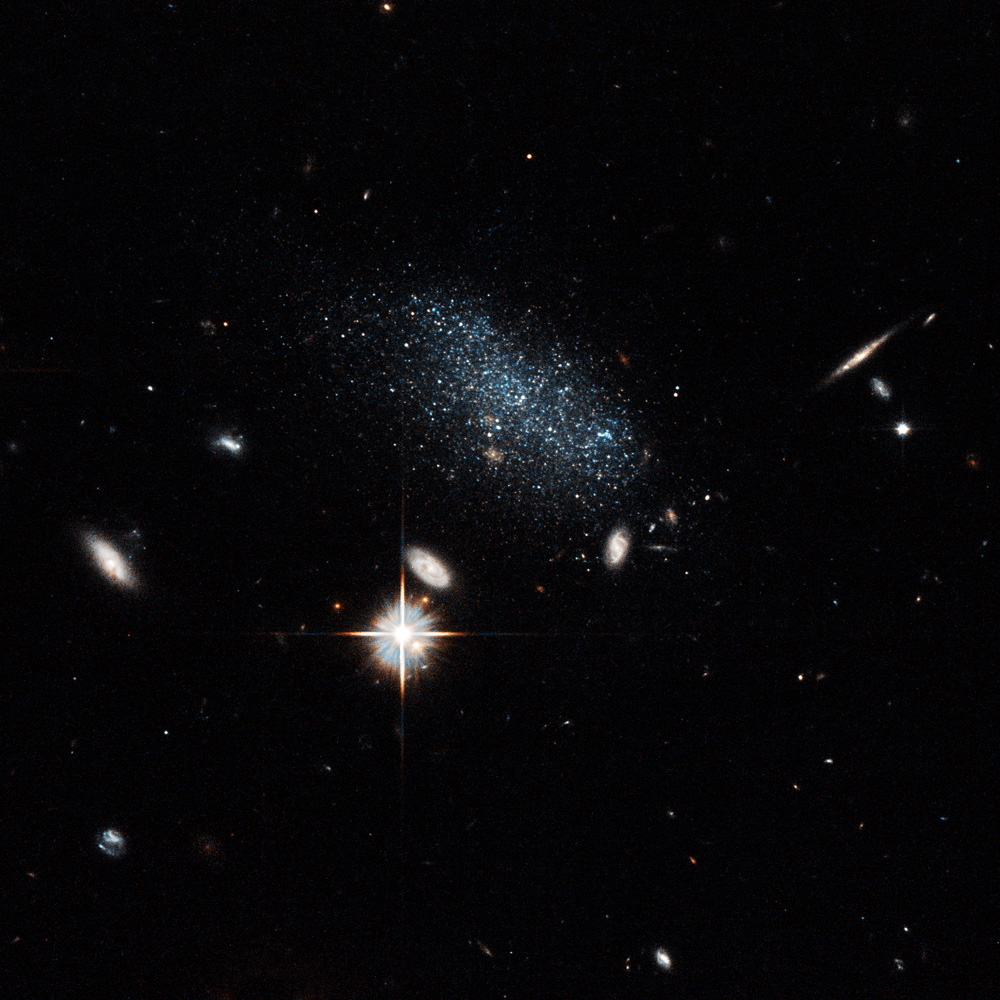
- Hubble Space Telescope image of Pisces B

Observation data (J2000.0 epoch)
- Constellation: Pisces
- Right ascension: 01^{h} 19^{m} 11.700^{s}
- Declination: +11° 07′ 18.22″
- Heliocentric radial velocity: 620.7 ± 0.2
- Distance: 30 Mly (9.2 Mpc)

Other designations
- Pisces B, PSC B, GALFA-Dw2

Pisces B (Psc B) is an irregular void dwarf galaxy within the Local Void in the constellation Pisces, near Pisces A, and lies 9.2 megaparsecs (30 million light-years) away from the Earth. It was discovered by Yale, Columbia, and CalTech astronomers using the WIYN Observatory in November 2014, along with its neighbor Pisces A, as a result of a blind HI region survey.

== Structure ==
Pisces B consists of an irregular-galaxy structure, with a much less complex composition consisting of cooler gas in comparison to other galaxies; this is most likely a result of lower rates of star formation throughout the galaxy's past. However, Pisces B is currently traveling towards a larger region of gas and other interstellar mediums; as a result, both Pisces A and B are expected to undergo starburst periods sometime in the next few billion years.

== Discovery ==
Astronomers Erik Tollerud and Marla Geha of Yale University, Jana Grcevich and Mary Putman of Columbia University, and Daniel Stern of CalTech first reported the two galaxies in November 2014 as a result of GALFA-H I, an optical imaging and spectroscopy survey of 21-centimeter emission HI clouds, and remain the only two galaxies to have been discovered by an HI survey. Their existences were later confirmed by a series of observation by Hubble.

Pisces A and B were also found to be beyond the range of any significant dark-matter halos; this has made them points of intense study, as they provide crucial information to galaxy formation and existing dwarf galaxy models.

== See Also ==
- Pisces A, another void dwarf galaxy in the Local Void
