= Pisces A =

Void dwarf Galaxy in the constellation Pisces

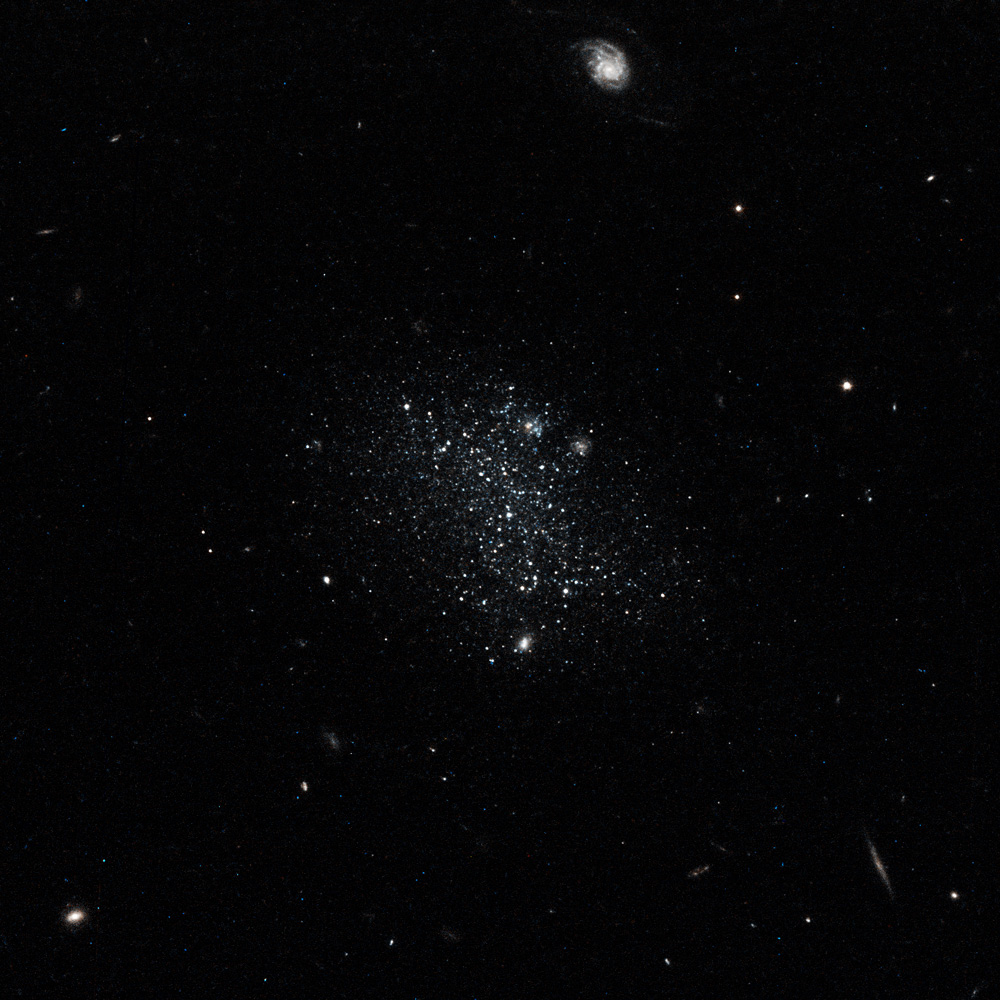
- Hubble Space Telescope image of Pisces A

Observation data (J2000.0 epoch)
- Constellation: Pisces
- Right ascension: 00^{h} 14^{m} 46.000^{s}
- Declination: +10° 48′ 47.01″
- Distance: 18.4 Mly (5.64 Mpc)
- Absolute magnitude (V): −11.57+0.06 −0.05

Characteristics
- Mass: 1×10^{7} M_{☉}
- Size: 145+5 −6 pc

Other designations
- Pisces A, PSC A, GALFA-Dw1

Pisces A (Psc A) is a void dwarf galaxy located in the Local Void in the constellation Pisces, near Pisces B. It is 18.4 million light-years (5.64 megaparsecs) away from Earth, and was discovered by the WIYN Observatory. About 100 million years ago, the galaxy started moving out of the void and into the local filament zone and denser gaseous environment, triggering a brief starburst period.
