= Field galaxy =

Galaxy that does not belong to a larger cluster of galaxies

A field galaxy is a galaxy that does not belong to a larger galaxy group or cluster and hence is gravitationally alone.

Roughly 80% of all galaxies located within 5 Mpc (16 Mly) of the Milky Way are in groups or clusters of galaxies. Most low-surface-brightness galaxies are field galaxies. The median Hubble-type of field galaxies is Sb, a type of spiral galaxy.

== List of field galaxies ==
A list of nearby relatively bright field galaxies within the Local Volume, about 10 Mpc (33 Mly)

Galaxy	Type	Size	Constellation	RA	DEC	Distance	Notes
NGC 404	SA(s)0		Andromeda	01^{h} 09^{m} 27.0^{s}	+35° 43′ 04″	11.2 Mly (3.4 Mpc)	
NGC 1313	SB(s)d		Reticulum	03^{h} 18^{m} 15.4^{s}	−66° 29′ 50″	12.89 Mly (3.95 Mpc)	Nicknamed the "Topsy Turvy Galaxy" due to its uneven shape
NGC 2188	Sm		Columba	06^{h} 10^{m} 09.7^{s}	−34° 06′ 50″	27.5 Mly (8.4 Mpc)	
NGC 2683	Sc		Lynx	08^{h} 52^{m} 41.3^{s}	+33° 25′ 18″	32.9 Mly (10.1 Mpc)	
NGC 2903	SBbc		Leo	09^{h} 32^{m} 10.1^{s}	+21° 30′ 03″	30.6 Mly (9.4 Mpc)	
NGC 3115	S0		Sextans	10^{h} 05^{m} 14.0^{s}	−7° 43′ 07″	31.6 Mly (9.7 Mpc)	
NGC 3621	SA(s)d		Hydra	11^{h} 18^{m} 16.5^{s}	–32° 48′ 51″	21.7 Mly (6.7 Mpc)	
NGC 4136	SABc		Coma Berenices	12^{h} 09^{m} 17.7^{s}	+29° 55′ 39″	40.9 Mly (12.5 Mpc)	
NGC 4605	SB(s)c		Ursa Major	12^{h} 39^{m} 59.4^{s}	+61° 36′ 33″	15.3 Mly (4.7 Mpc)	
NGC 5068	SAB(rs)cd		Virgo	13^{h} 18^{m} 54.8^{s}	−21° 02′ 21″	19.8 Mly (6.1 Mpc)	
NGC 6503	SA(s)cd; LINER	30 kly (9.2 kpc)	Draco	17^{h} 49^{m} 26.514^{s}	+70° 08′ 39.63″	18.5 Mly (5.7 Mpc)	Also called the "Lost-In-Space galaxy" due to its location next to the Local Void.

== See also ==
- Void galaxy
