= Morphological Catalogue of Galaxies =

Russian catalogue of 30,642 galaxies

- Alternative names: MCG

The Morphological Catalogue of Galaxies (MCG) or Morfologiceskij Katalog Galaktik, is a Russian catalogue of 30,642 galaxies compiled by Boris Vorontsov-Velyaminov and V. P. Arkhipova. It is based on scrutiny of prints of the Palomar Sky Survey plates, and putatively complete to a photographic magnitude of 15. Including galaxies to magnitude 16 would have resulted in an unmanageably large dataset.

== Publication ==
The catalogue was published in five parts (chapters) between 1962 and 1974, the final chapter including a certain number of galaxies with a photographic magnitude above 15.

== Gallery ==
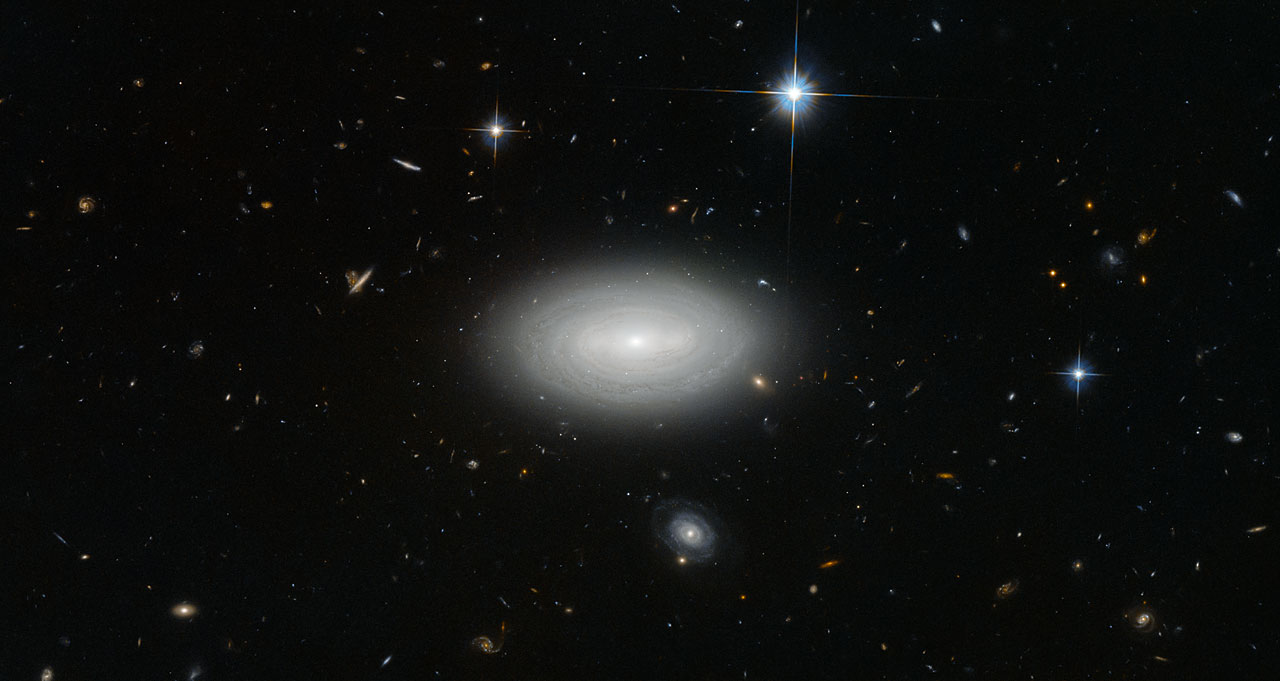
MCG+01-02-015

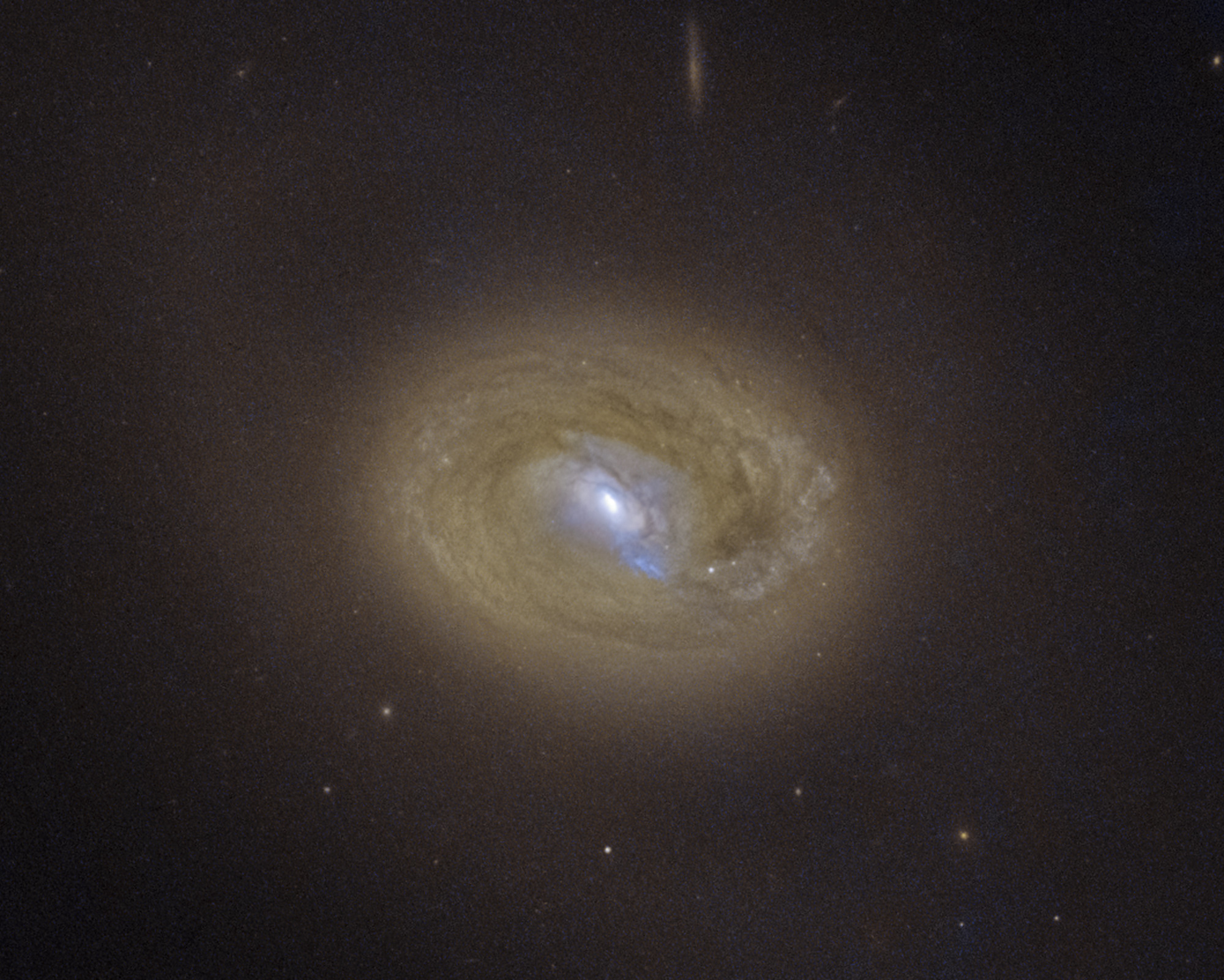
MCG-03-34-064

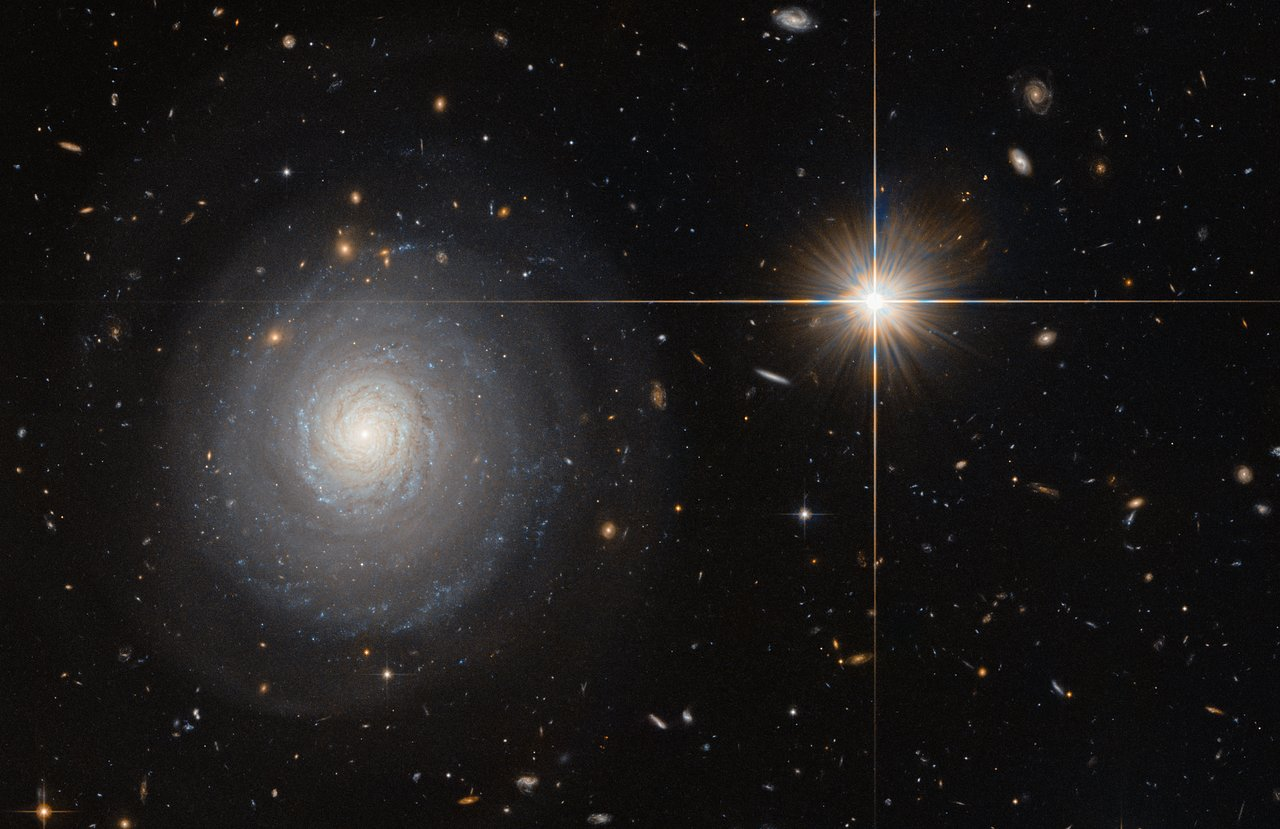
MCG+07-33-027

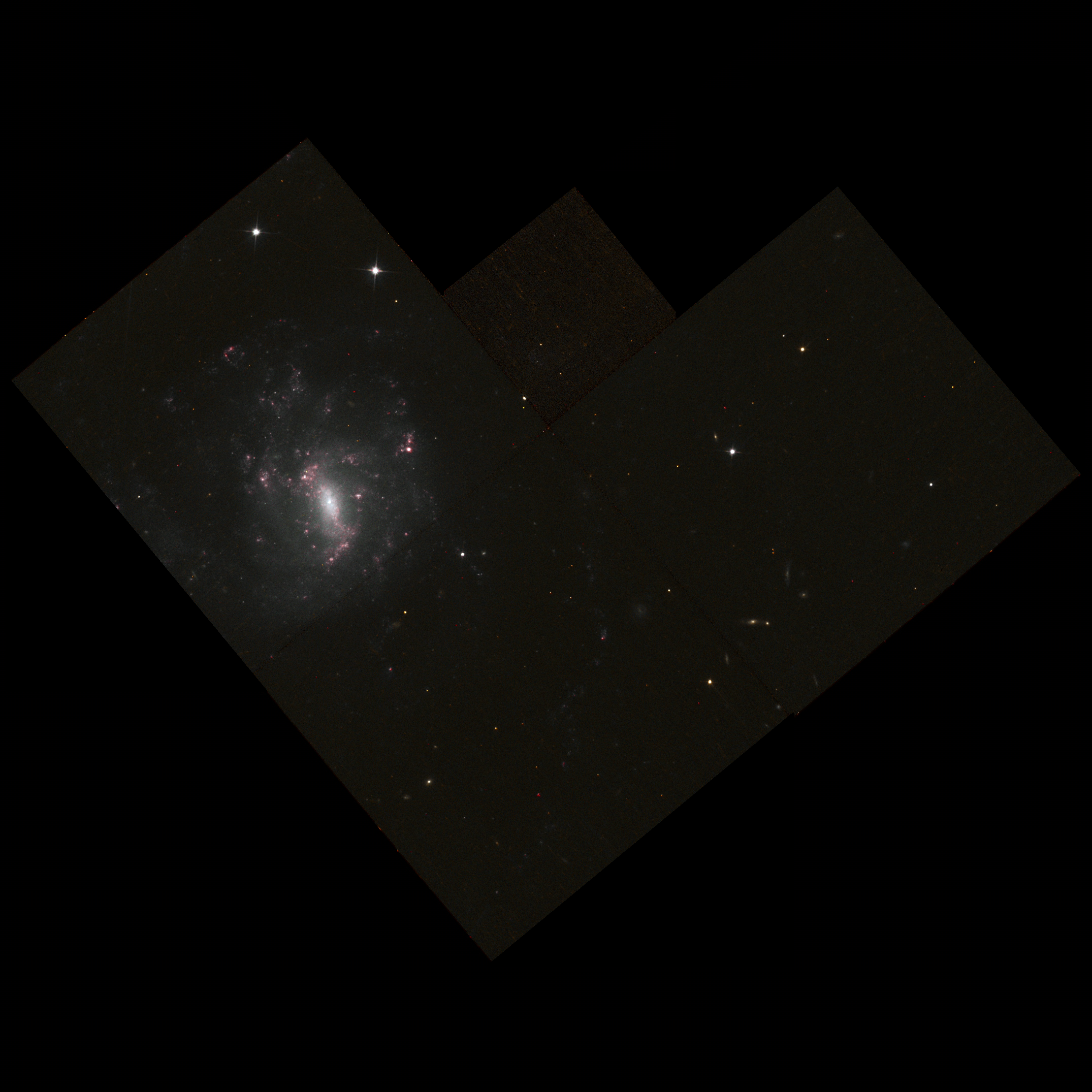
MCG-03-13-063

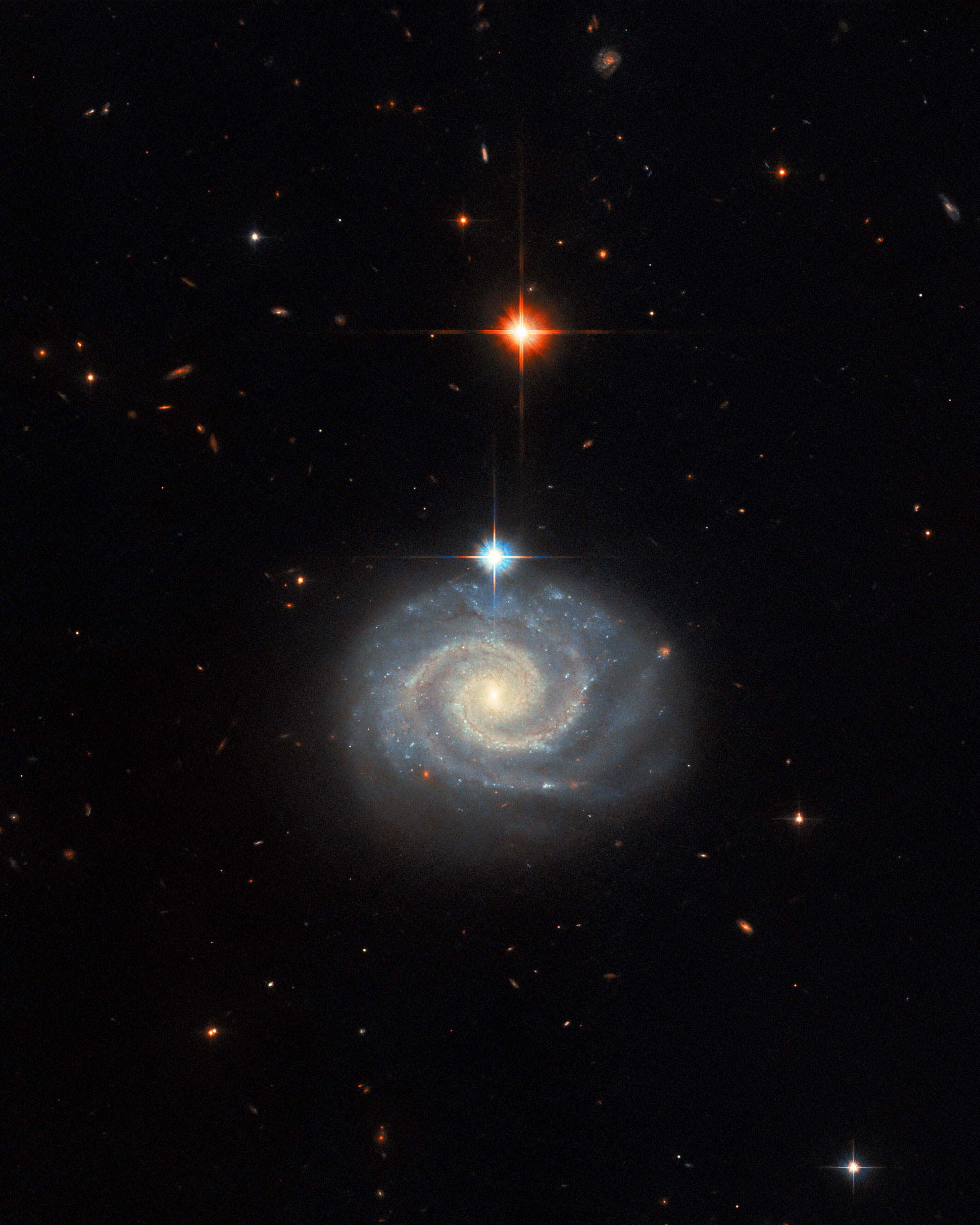
MCG-01-24-014

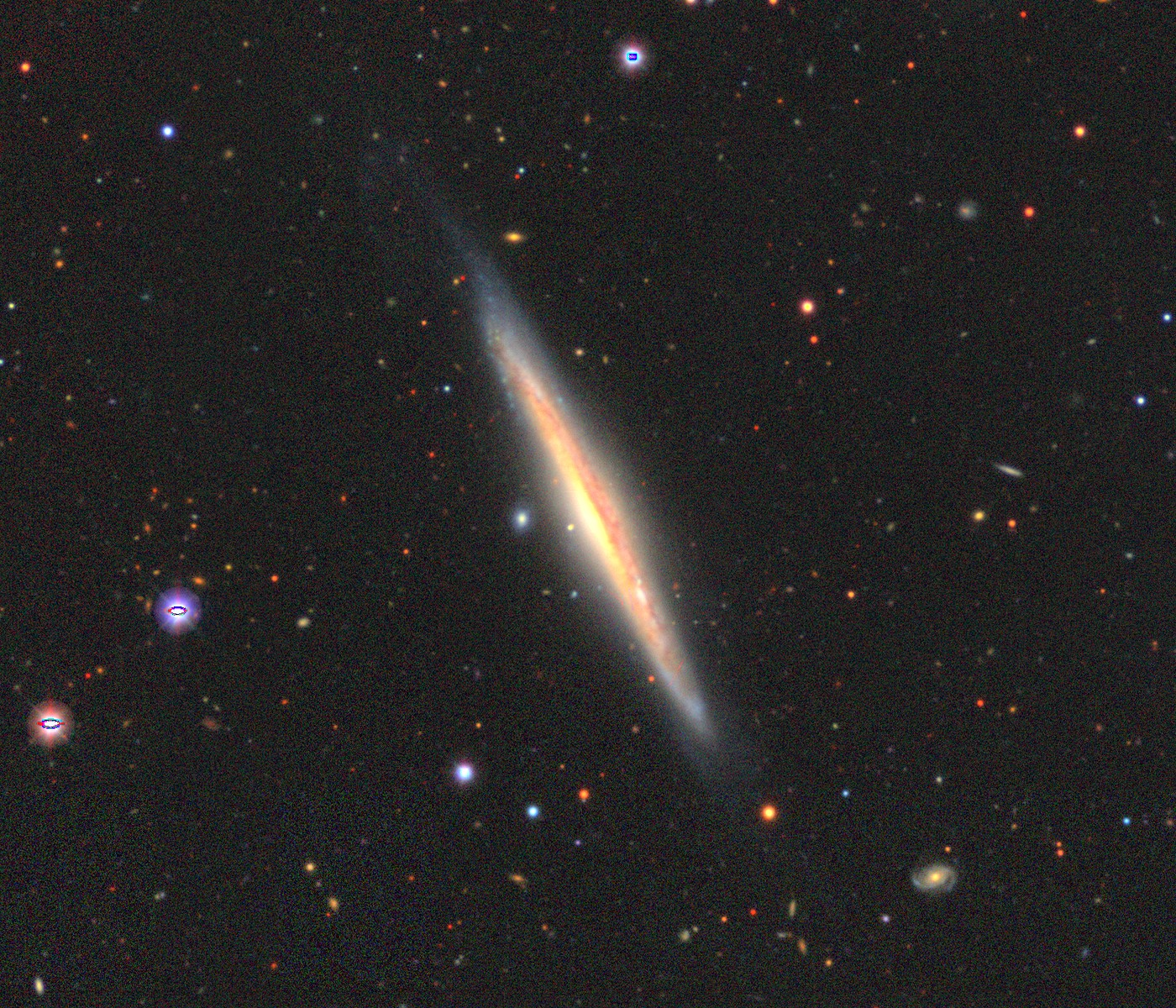
MCG-01-10-035

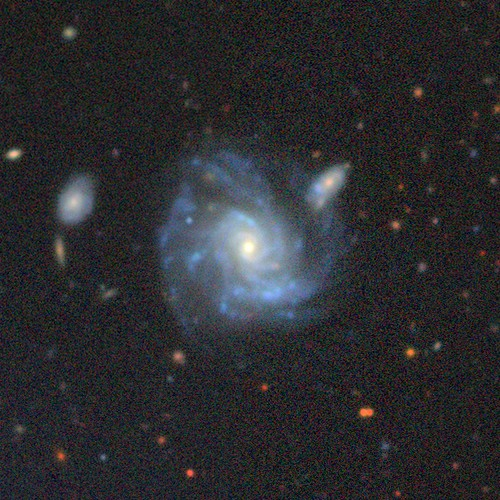
MCG+04-26-032
