= Very Large Telescope =

Telescope in the Atacama Desert, Chile

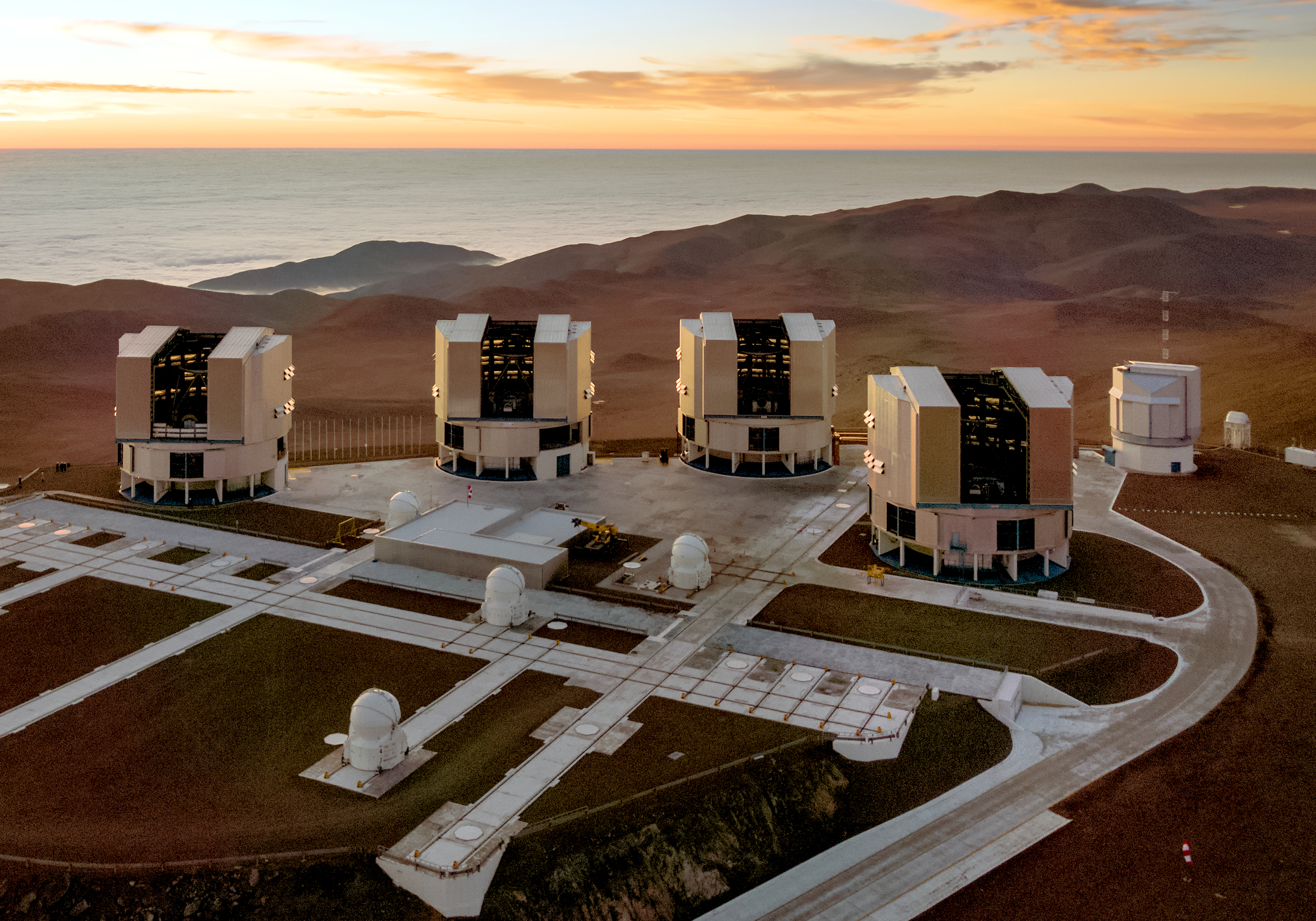
- The four Unit Telescopes that form the VLT together with the four Auxiliary Telescopes (VST at right)
- Alternative names: VLT
- Location: Antofagasta Region, Chile
- Coordinates: 24°37′39″S 70°24′15″W
- Altitude: 2,636 m (8,648 ft)
- Observing time: 320 nights per year
- Wavelength: 300 nm – 20 μm (N-UV, visible light, NIR, SWIR, MWIR, and LWIR)
- First light: 1998; 28 years ago (for the first Unit Telescope)
- Diameter: 4 × 8.2-metre Unit Telescopes (UT); 4 × 1.8-metre moveable Auxiliary Telescopes (AT)
- Angular resolution: 0.002 arcsecond
- Focal length: 120 m (393 ft 8 in)
- Website: www.eso.org/vlt
- Location within Chile
- Related media on Commons

The Very Large Telescope (VLT) is an astronomical facility operated since 1998 by the European Southern Observatory, located on Cerro Paranal in the Atacama Desert of northern Chile. It consists of four individual telescopes, each equipped with a primary mirror that measures 8.2 metres (27 ft) in diameter. These optical telescopes, named Antu, Kueyen, Melipal, and Yepun (all words for astronomical objects in the Mapuche language), are generally used separately but can be combined to achieve a very high angular resolution. The VLT array is also complemented by four movable Auxiliary Telescopes (ATs) with 1.8-metre (5.9 ft) apertures.

The VLT is capable of observing both visible and infrared wavelengths. Each individual telescope can detect objects that are roughly four billion times fainter than what can be seen with the naked eye. When all the telescopes are combined, the facility can achieve an angular resolution of approximately 0.002 arcseconds. In single telescope mode, the angular resolution is about 0.05 arcseconds.

The VLT is one of the most productive facilities for astronomy, second only to the Hubble Space Telescope in terms of the number of scientific papers produced from facilities operating at visible wavelengths. Some of the pioneering observations made using the VLT include the first direct image of an exoplanet, the tracking of stars orbiting around the supermassive black hole at the centre of the Milky Way, and observations of the afterglow of the furthest known gamma-ray burst.

== General information ==
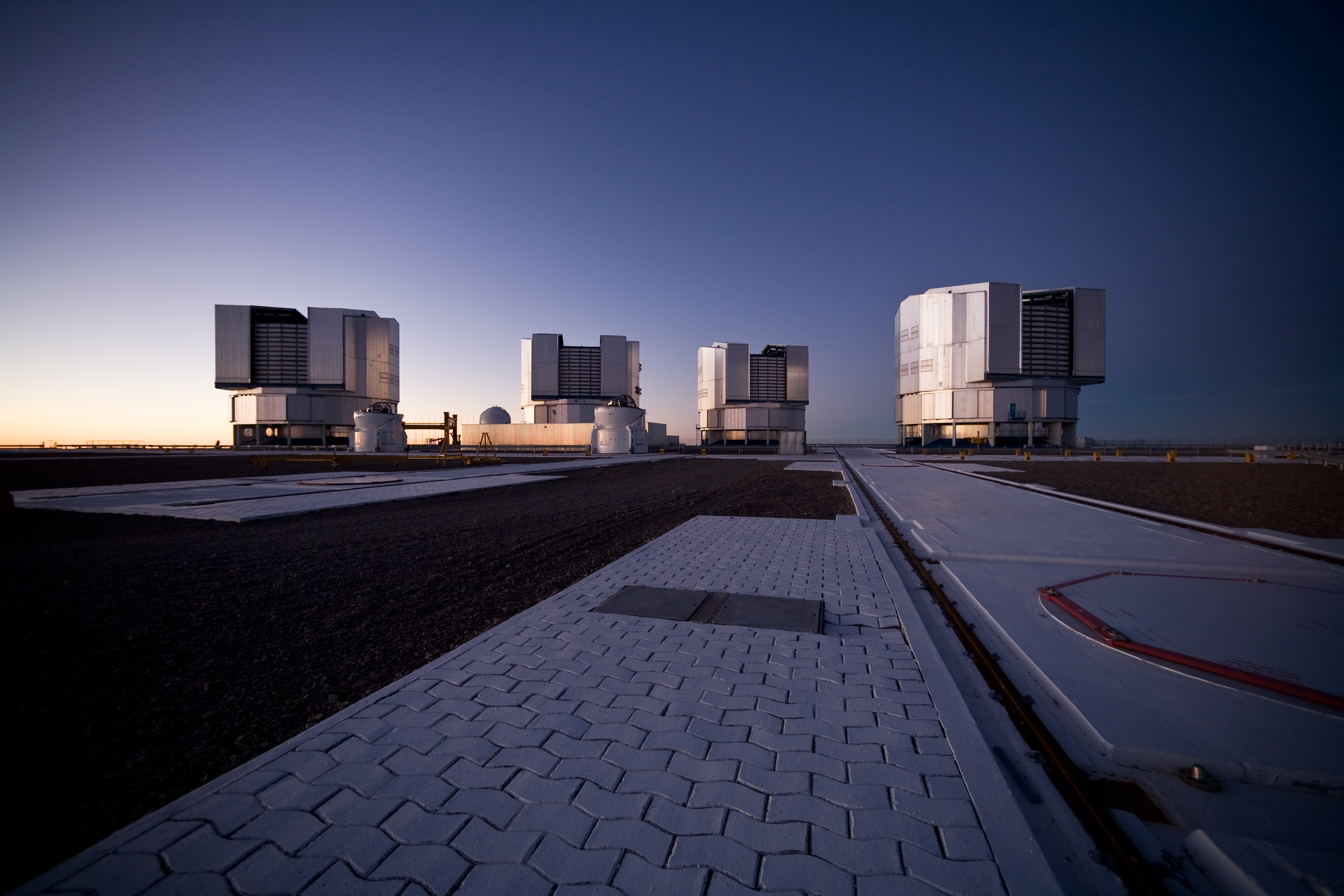
VLT's four Unit Telescopes

The VLT consists of an arrangement of four large, 8.2-metre (27 ft) diameter telescopes (called Unit Telescopes or UTs) with optical elements that can combine them into an astronomical interferometer (VLTI), which is used to resolve small objects. The interferometer also includes a set of four 1.8-metre (5.9 ft) diameter movable telescopes dedicated to interferometric observations. The first of the UTs started operating in May 1998 and was offered to the astronomical community on 1 April 1999. The other telescopes became operational in 1999 and 2000, enabling multi-telescope VLT capability. Four 1.8-metre Auxiliary Telescopes (ATs) have been added to the VLTI to make it available when the UTs are being used for other projects. These ATs were installed and became operational between 2004 and 2007.

The VLT's 8.2-meter telescopes were originally designed to operate in three modes:

- as a set of four independent telescopes (this is the primary mode of operation).
- as a single large coherent interferometric instrument (the VLT Interferometer or VLTI), for extra resolution. This mode is used for observations of relatively bright sources with a small angular extent.
- as a single large incoherent instrument, for extra light-gathering capacity. The instrumentation required to obtain a combined incoherent focus was not originally built. In 2009, new instrumentation proposals were put forward to potentially make that observing mode available. Multiple telescopes are sometimes independently pointed at the same object, either to increase the total light-gathering power or to provide simultaneous observations with complementary instruments.

=== Unit telescopes ===
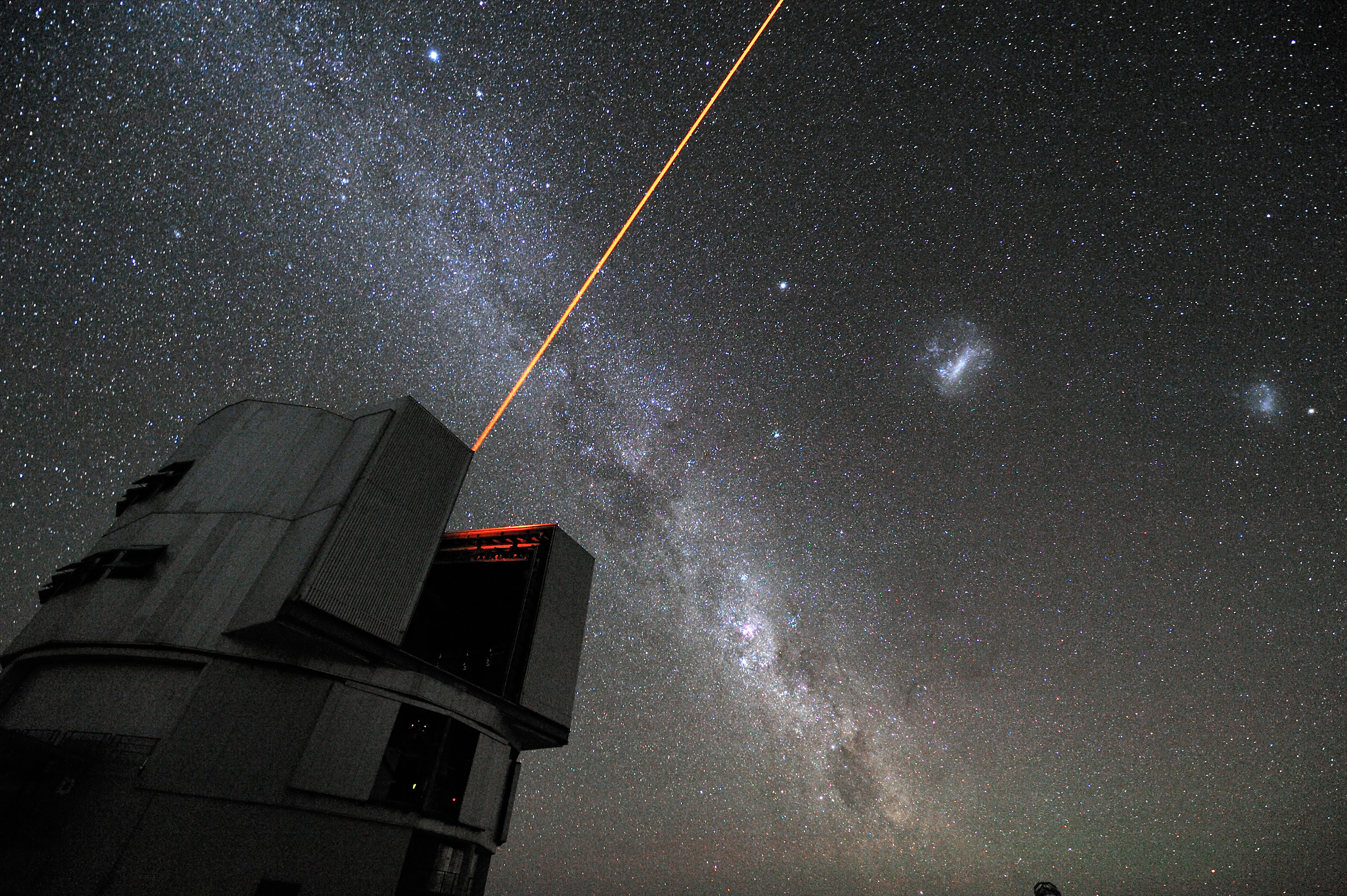
Laser used for adaptive optics. It excites sodium atoms in the atmosphere and creates a laser guide star.

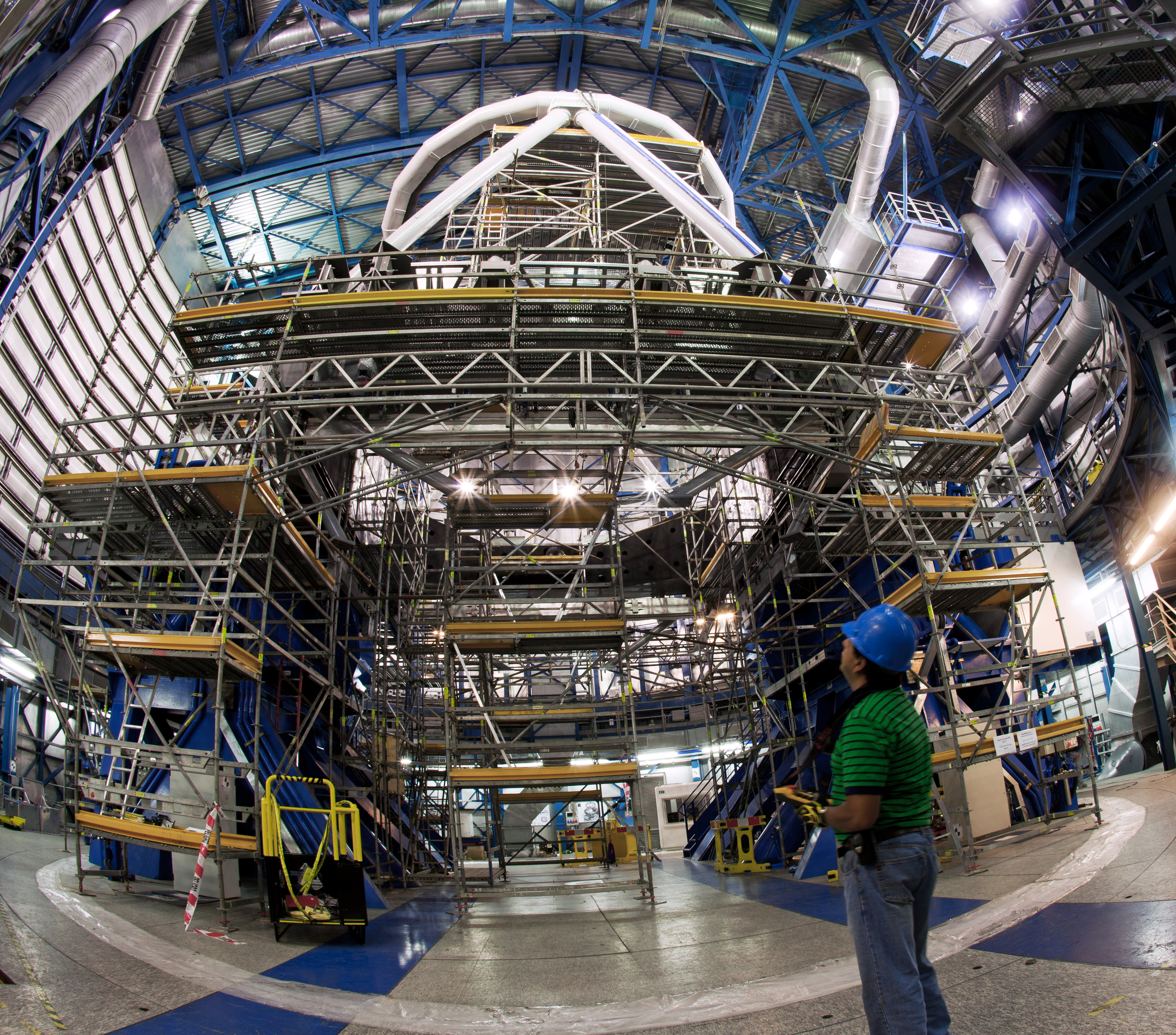
Upgrading Yepun (UT4) with the "Adaptive Optics Facility" in 2012

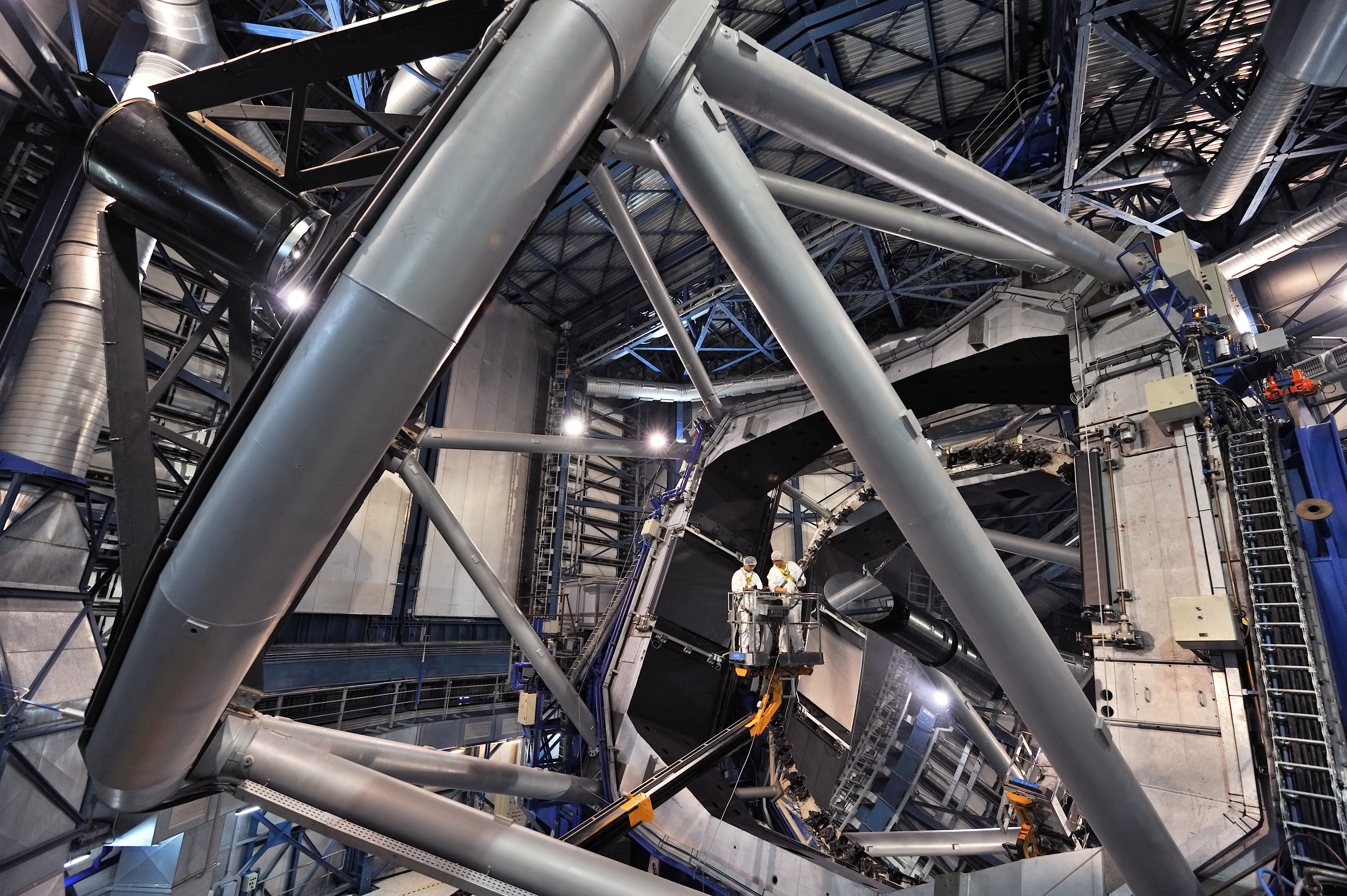
Unit telescope undergoing inspection

The UTs are equipped with a large set of instruments permitting observations to be performed from the near-ultraviolet to the mid-infrared (i.e. a large fraction of the light wavelengths accessible from the surface of the Earth), with the full range of techniques including high-resolution spectroscopy, multi-object spectroscopy, imaging, and high-resolution imaging. In particular, the VLT has several adaptive optics systems, which correct for the effects of atmospheric turbulence, providing images almost as sharp as if the telescope were in space. In the near-infrared, the adaptive optics images of the VLT are up to three times sharper than those of the Hubble Space Telescope, and the spectroscopic resolution is many times better than Hubble. The VLTs are noted for their high level of observing efficiency and automation.

The primary mirrors of the UTs are 8.2 metres (26.9 ft) in diameter but, in practice, the pupil of the telescopes is defined by their secondary mirrors, effectively reducing the usable diameter to 8.0 metres (26.2 ft) at the Nasmyth focus and 8.1 metres (26.6 ft) at the Cassegrain focus.

The 8.2-metre-diameter telescopes are housed in compact, thermally controlled buildings, which rotate synchronously with the telescopes. This design minimises any adverse effects on the observing conditions, for instance from air turbulence in the telescope tube, which might otherwise occur due to variations in the temperature and wind flow.

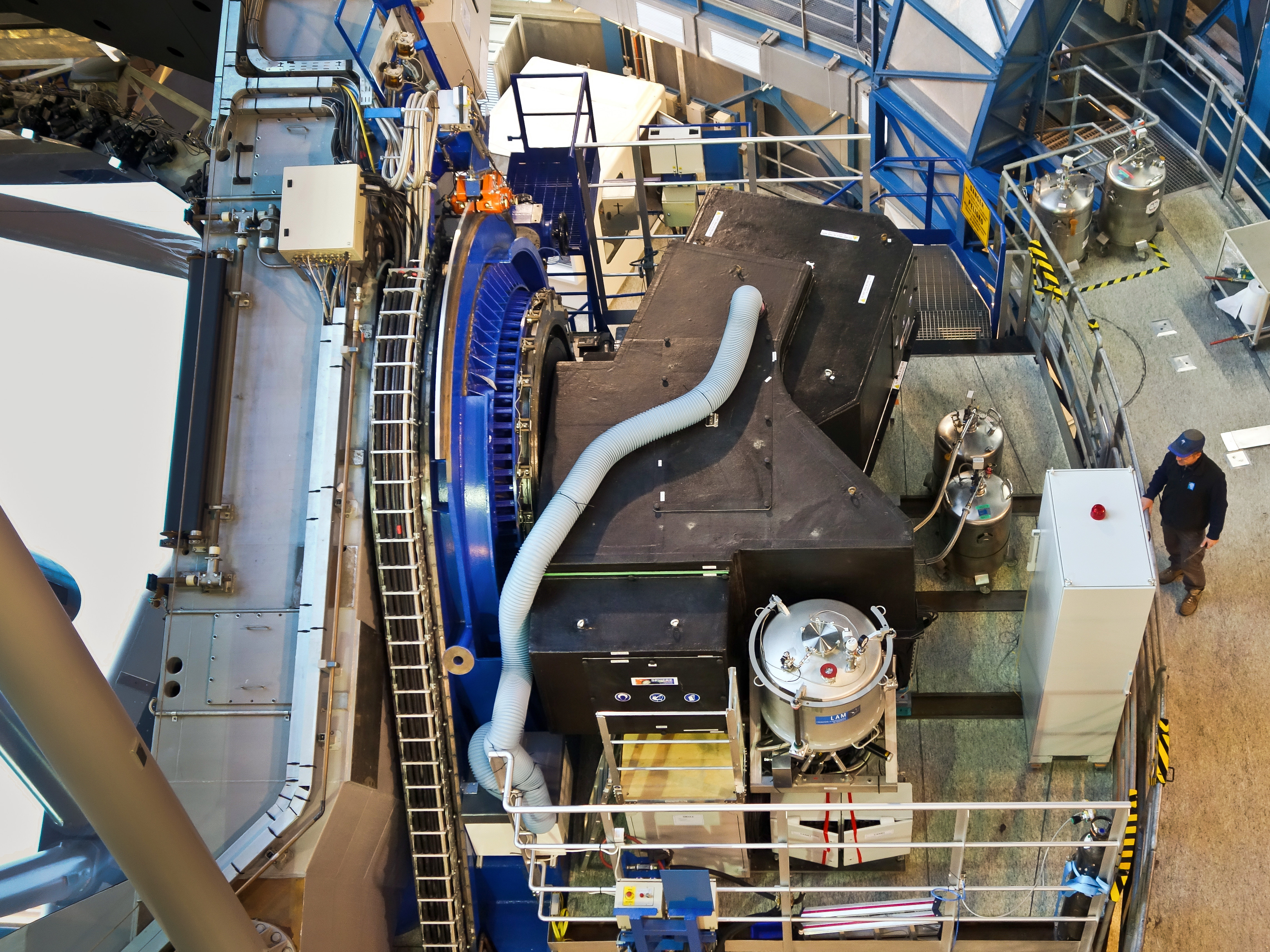
The SPHERE instrument attached to the VLT Unit Telescope 3

The principal role of the main VLT telescopes is to operate as four independent telescopes. The interferometry (combining light from multiple telescopes) is used about 20 percent of the time for very high-resolution on bright objects, for example, on Betelgeuse. This mode allows astronomers to see details up to 25 times finer than with individual telescopes. The light beams are combined in the VLTI using a complex system of mirrors in tunnels where the light paths must be kept equal within differences of less than 1 μm over a light path of a hundred metres. With this kind of precision, the VLTI can reconstruct images with an angular resolution of milliarcseconds (a few tens of nanoradians).

==== Mapuche names for the Unit Telescopes ====
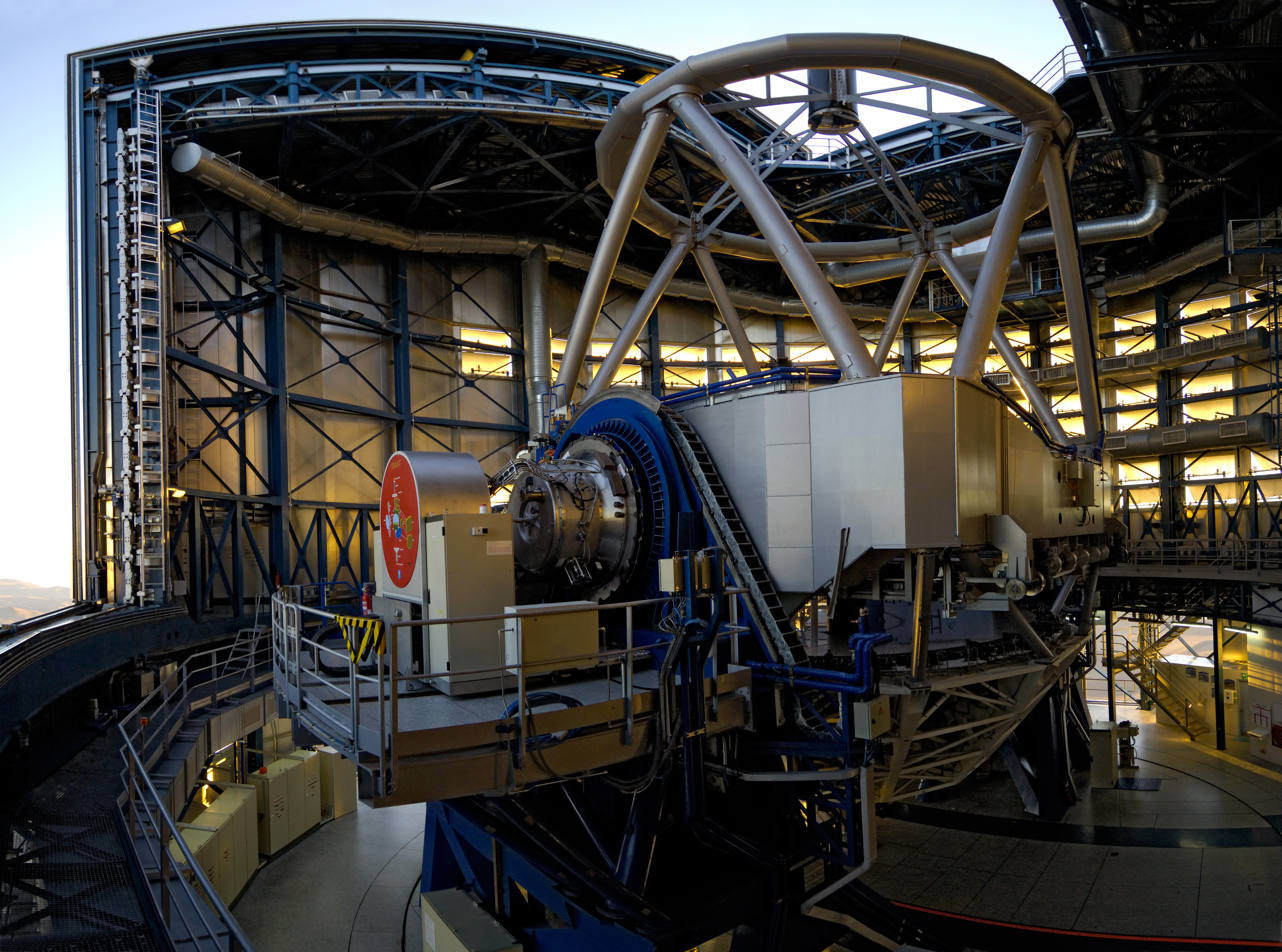
The interior of Antu (UT1), meaning "sun" in the Mapuche language

It had long been ESO's intention to provide "real" names to the four VLT Unit Telescopes, to replace the original technical designations of UT1 to UT4. In March 1999, at the time of the Paranal inauguration, four meaningful names of objects in the sky in the Mapuche language were chosen. These indigenous people live mostly south of Santiago de Chile.

An essay contest was arranged in this connection among schoolchildren of the Chilean II Region of which Antofagasta is the capital to write about the implications of these names. It drew many entries dealing with the cultural heritage of ESO's host country.

The winning essay was submitted by 17-year-old Jorssy Albanez Castilla from Chuquicamata near the city of Calama. She received the prize, an amateur telescope, during the inauguration of the Paranal site.

Unit Telescopes 1–4 are since known as Antu (Sun), Kueyen (Moon), Melipal (Southern Cross), and Yepun (Evening Star, when Venus appeared in the morning it was referred to as Wünelfe), respectively. Originally there was some confusion as to whether Yepun actually stands for the evening star Venus, because a Spanish-Mapuche dictionary from the 1940s wrongly translated Yepun as "Sirius".

=== Auxiliary telescopes ===
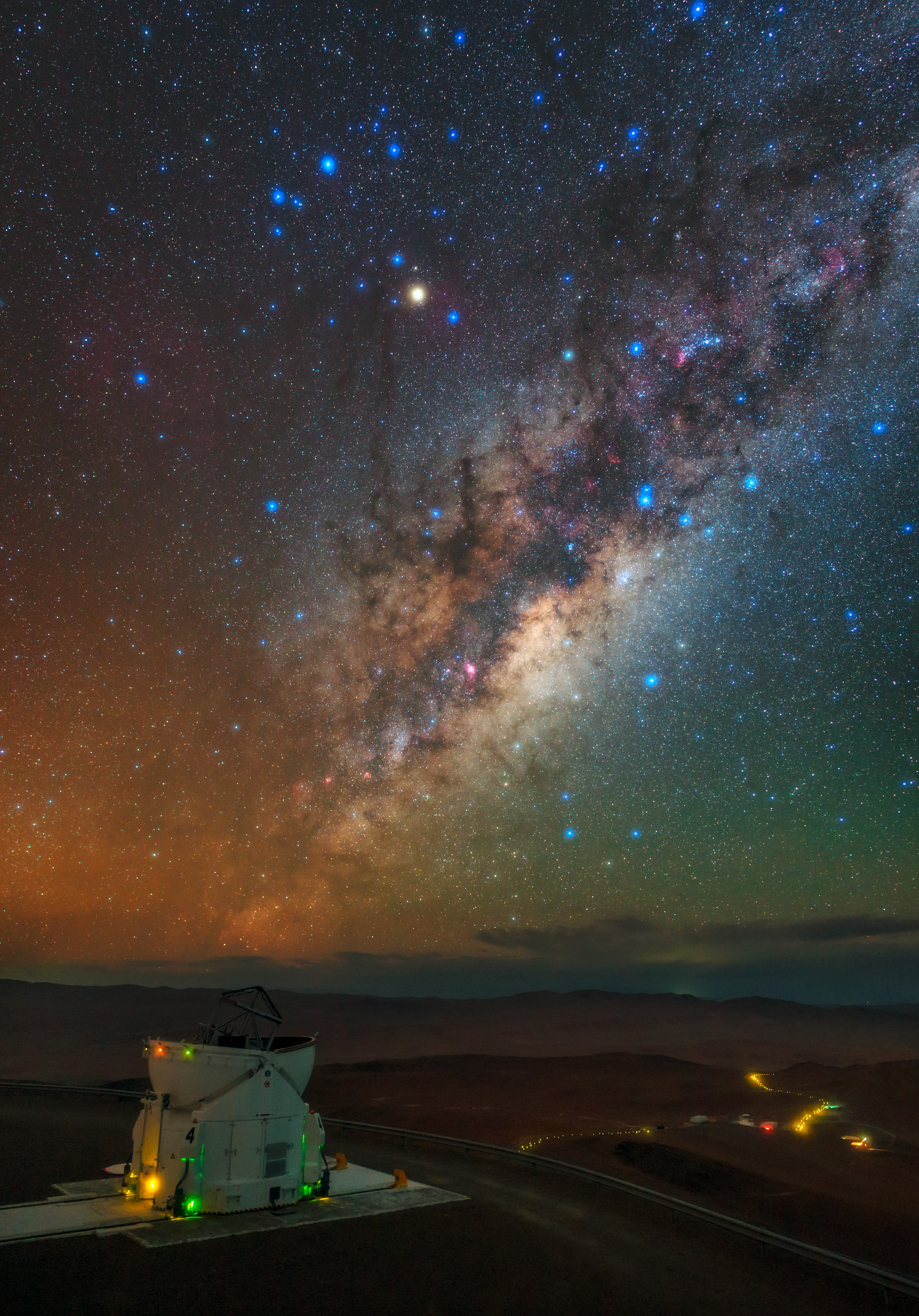
Auxiliary Telescope, the Residencia and the heart of the Milky Way

Although the four 8.2-metre Unit Telescopes can be combined in the VLTI, their observation time is spent mostly on individual observations, and are used for interferometric observations for a limited number of nights every year. However, the four smaller 1.8-metre ATs are available and dedicated to interferometry to allow the VLTI to operate every night.

The top part of each AT is a round enclosure, made from two sets of three segments, which open and close. Its job is to protect the delicate 1.8-metre telescope from desert conditions. The enclosure is supported by the boxy transporter section, which also contains electronics cabinets, liquid cooling systems, air-conditioning units, power supplies, and more. During astronomical observations the enclosure and transporter are mechanically isolated from the telescope, to ensure that no vibrations compromise the data collected.

The transporter section runs on tracks, so the ATs can be moved to 30 different observing locations. As the VLTI acts rather like a single telescope as large as the group of telescopes combined, changing the positions of the ATs means that the VLTI can be adjusted according to the needs of the observing project. The reconfigurable nature of the VLTI is similar to that of the Very Large Array.

== Scientific results ==
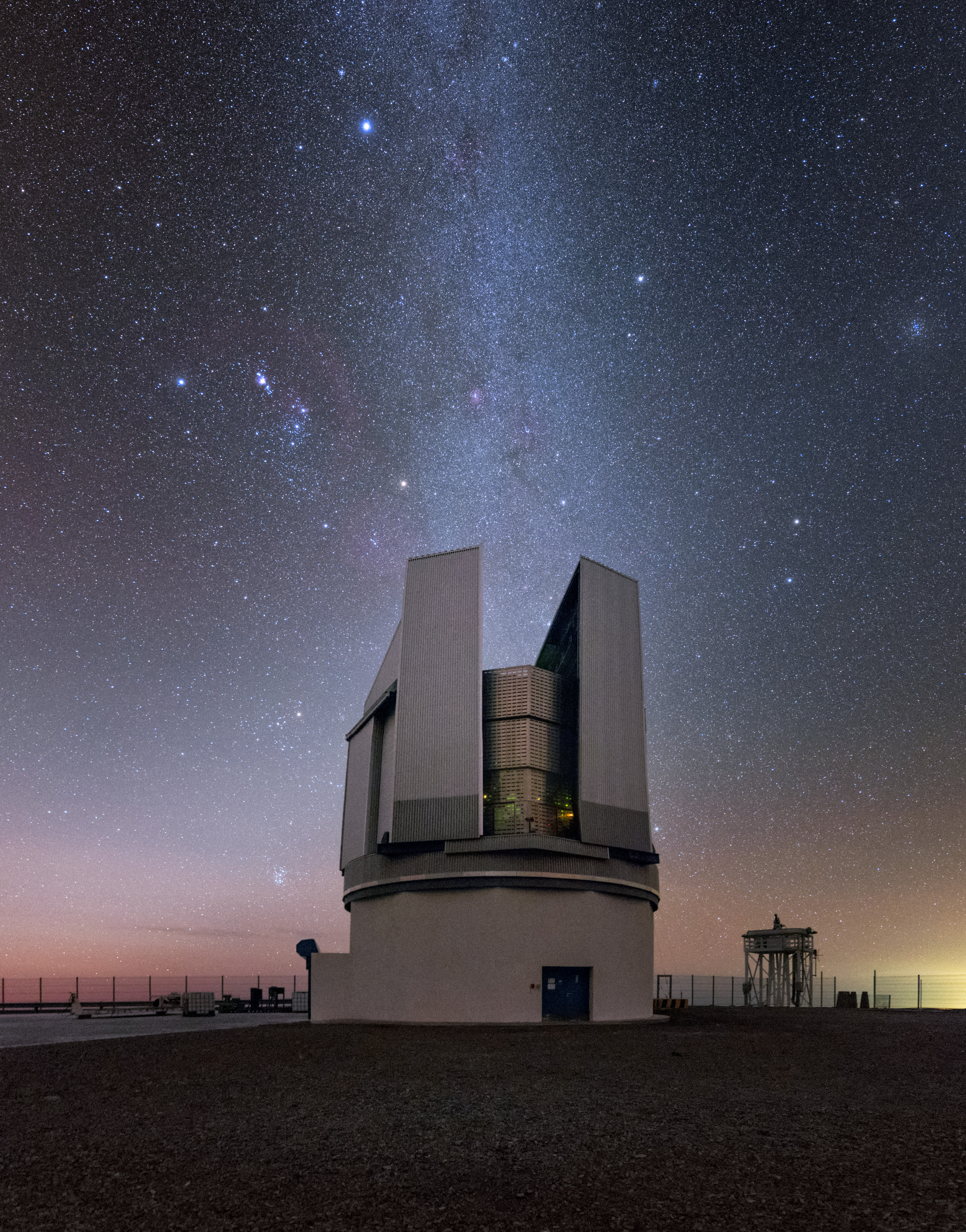
The soft glow of the Milky Way can be seen behind the VLT Survey Telescope (VST) at ESO's Paranal Observatory.

Results from the VLT have led to the publication of an average of more than one peer-reviewed scientific paper per day. For instance in 2017, over 600 refereed scientific papers were published based on VLT data. The telescope's scientific discoveries include direct imaging of Beta Pictoris b, the first extrasolar planet so imaged, tracking individual stars moving around the supermassive black hole at the centre of the Milky Way, and observing the afterglow of the furthest known gamma-ray burst.

In 2018, the VLT helped to perform the first successful test of Albert Einstein's General Relativity on the motion of a star passing through the extreme gravitational field near the supermassive black hole, that is the gravitational redshift. In fact, the observation has been conducted for over 26 years with the SINFONI and NACO adaptive optics instruments in the VLT while the new approach in 2018 also used the beam-combiner instrument GRAVITY. The Galactic Centre team at the Max Planck Institute for Extraterrestrial Physics (MPE) used these observations to reveal these effects for the first time.

Other discoveries with VLT's signature include the detection of carbon monoxide molecules in a galaxy located almost 11 billion light-years away for the first time, a feat that had remained elusive for 25 years. This has allowed astronomers to obtain the most precise measurement of the cosmic temperature at such a remote epoch. Another important study was that of the violent flares from the supermassive black hole at the centre of the Milky Way. The VLT and APEX teamed up to reveal material being stretched out as it orbits in the intense gravity close to the central black hole.

Using the VLT, astronomers have also estimated the age of extremely old stars in the NGC 6397 cluster. Based on stellar evolution models, two stars were found to be 13.4 ± 0.8 billion years old, that is, they are from the earliest era of star formation in the Universe. They have also analysed the atmosphere around a super-Earth exoplanet for the first time using the VLT. The planet, which is known as GJ 1214b, was studied as it passed in front of its parent star and some of the starlight passed through the planet's atmosphere.

In all, of the top 10 discoveries done at ESO's observatories, seven made use of the VLT.

== Technical details ==
=== Telescopes ===
Each Unit Telescope is a Ritchey-Chretien Cassegrain telescope with a 22-tonne 8.2-metre Zerodur primary mirror of 14.4-metre focal length, and a 1.1-metre lightweight beryllium secondary mirror. A flat tertiary mirror diverts the light to one of two instruments at the f/15 Nasmyth foci on either side, with a system focal length of 120 metres, or the tertiary tilts aside to allow light through the primary mirror central hole to a third instrument at the Cassegrain focus. This allows switching between any of the three instruments within five minutes, to match observing conditions. Additional mirrors can send the light via tunnels to the central VLTI beam-combiners. The maximum field-of-view (at Nasmyth foci) is around 27 arcminutes in diameter, slightly smaller than the full moon, though most instruments view a narrower field.

Each telescope has an alt-azimuth mount with total mass around 350 tonnes, and uses active optics with 150 supports on the back of the primary mirror to control the shape of the thin (177 mm thick) mirror by computers.

=== Instruments ===
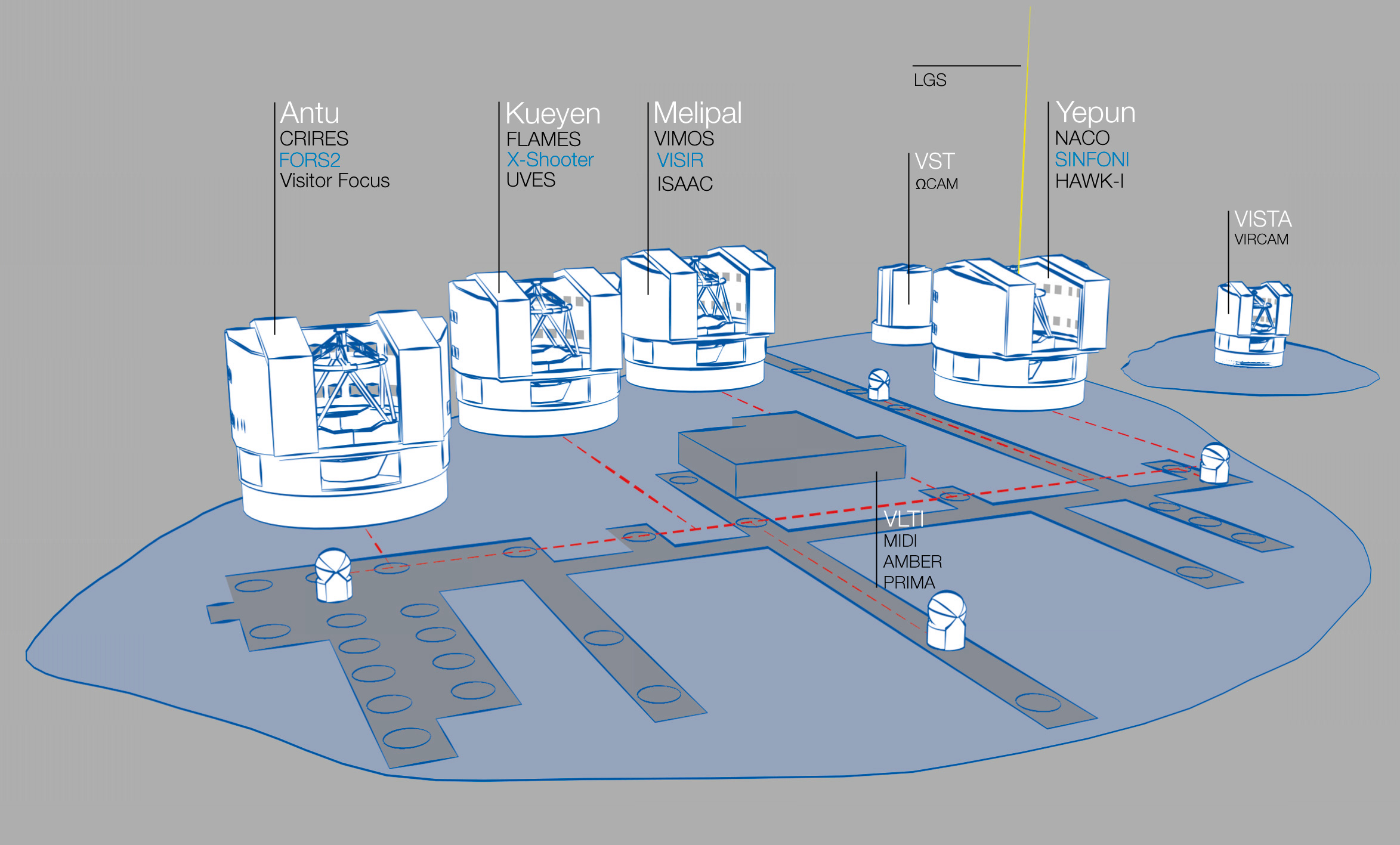
A diagram showing instruments at VLT

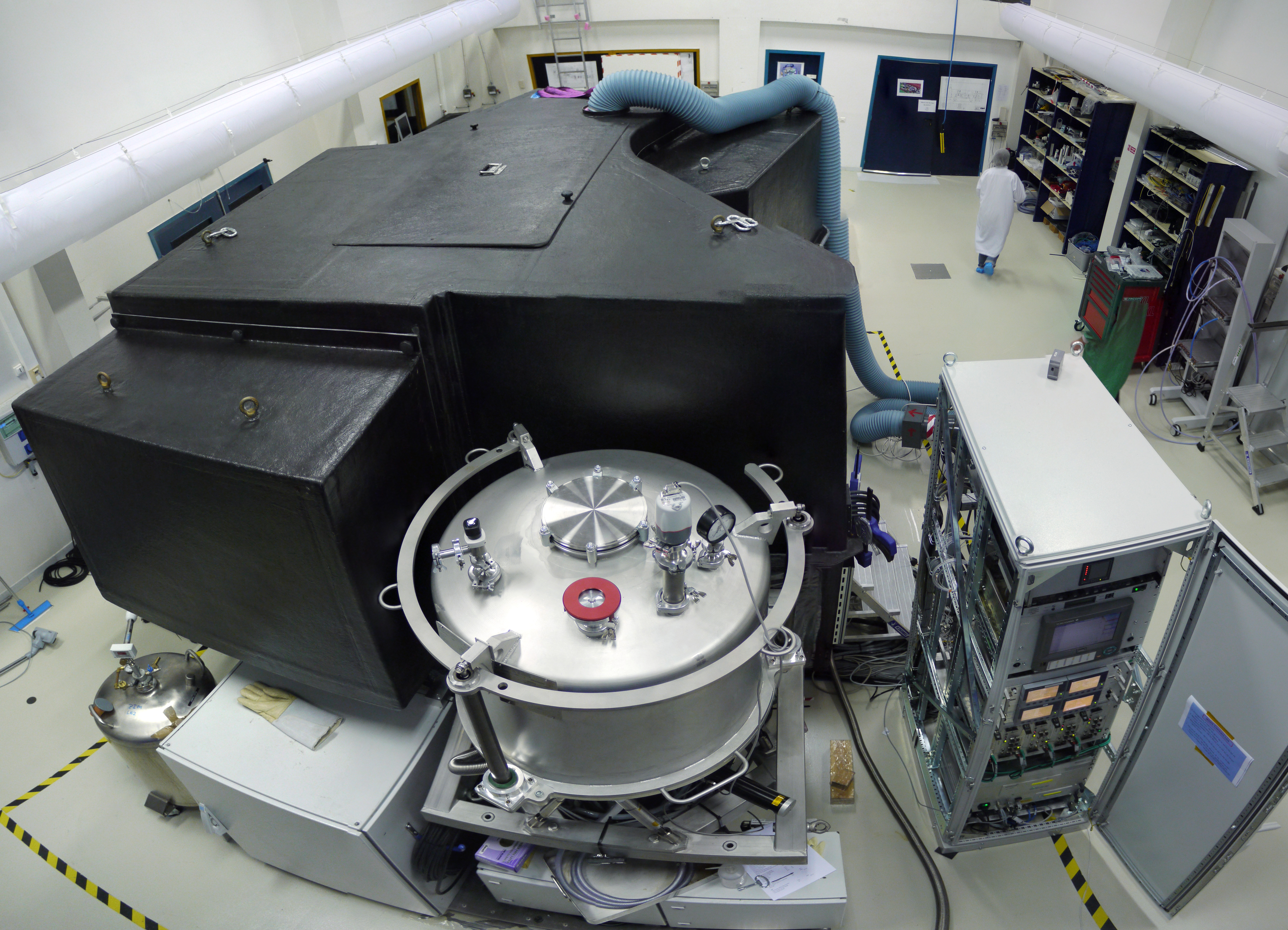
SPHERE is an exoplanet imager.

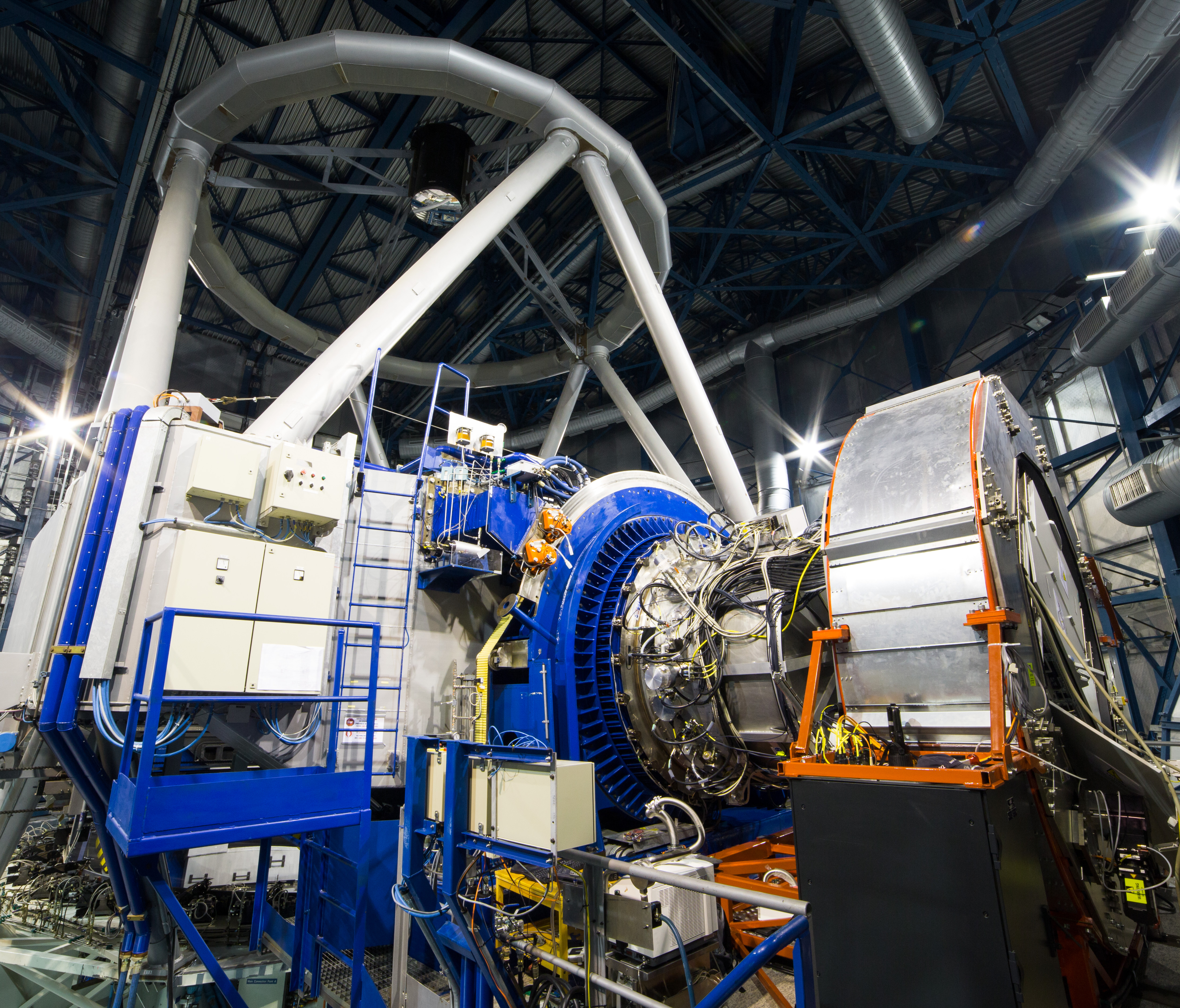
KMOS on the VLT's Antu (UT1) at the time of first light in 2012

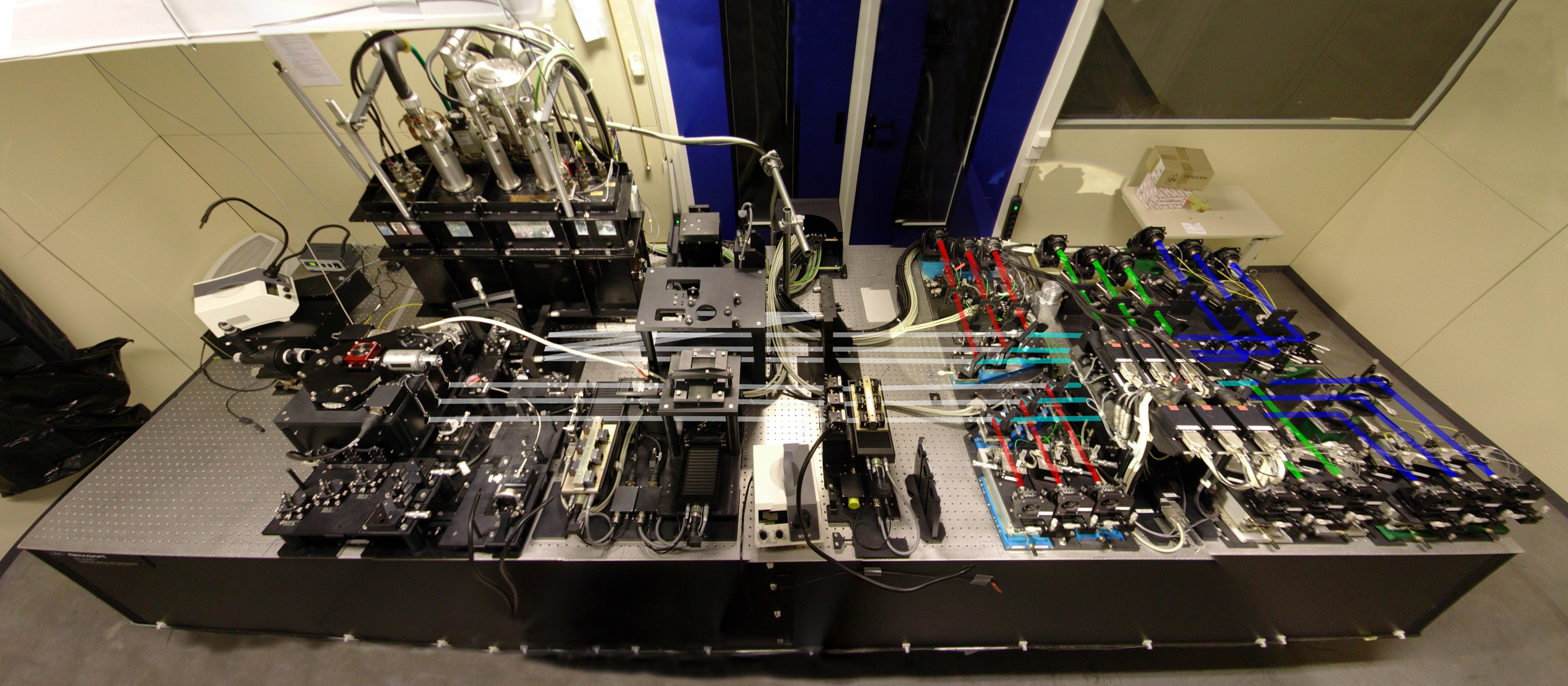
The AMBER instrument before its installation at the VLTI in 2003

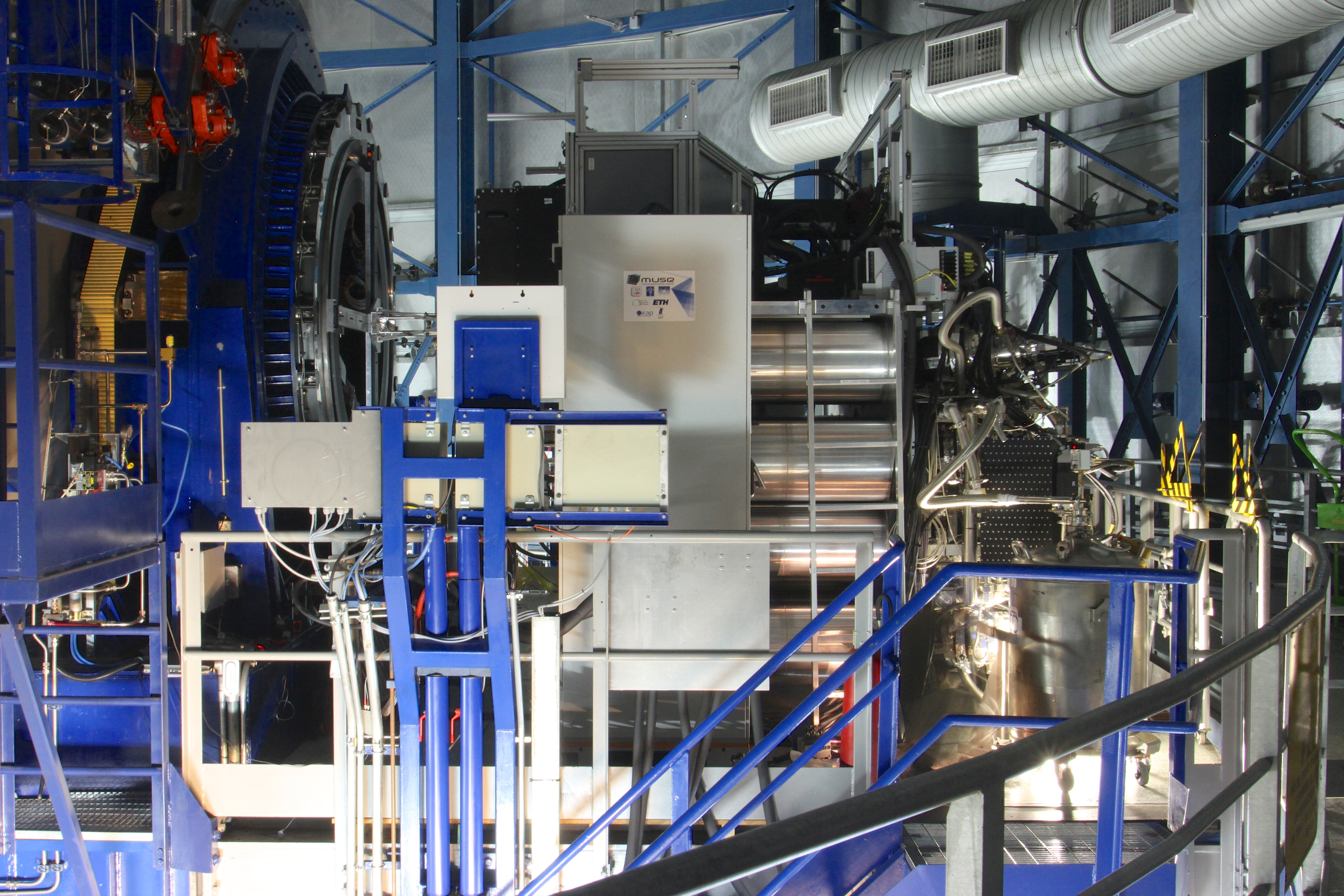
MUSE mounted on VLT Yepun (UT4)

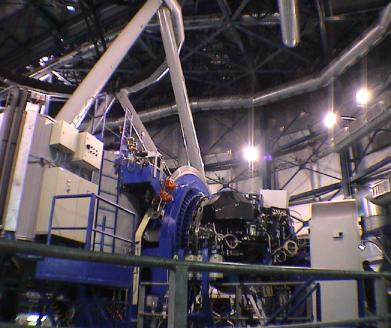
VIMOS, the Visible Multi Object Spectrograph, at Melipal (UT3)

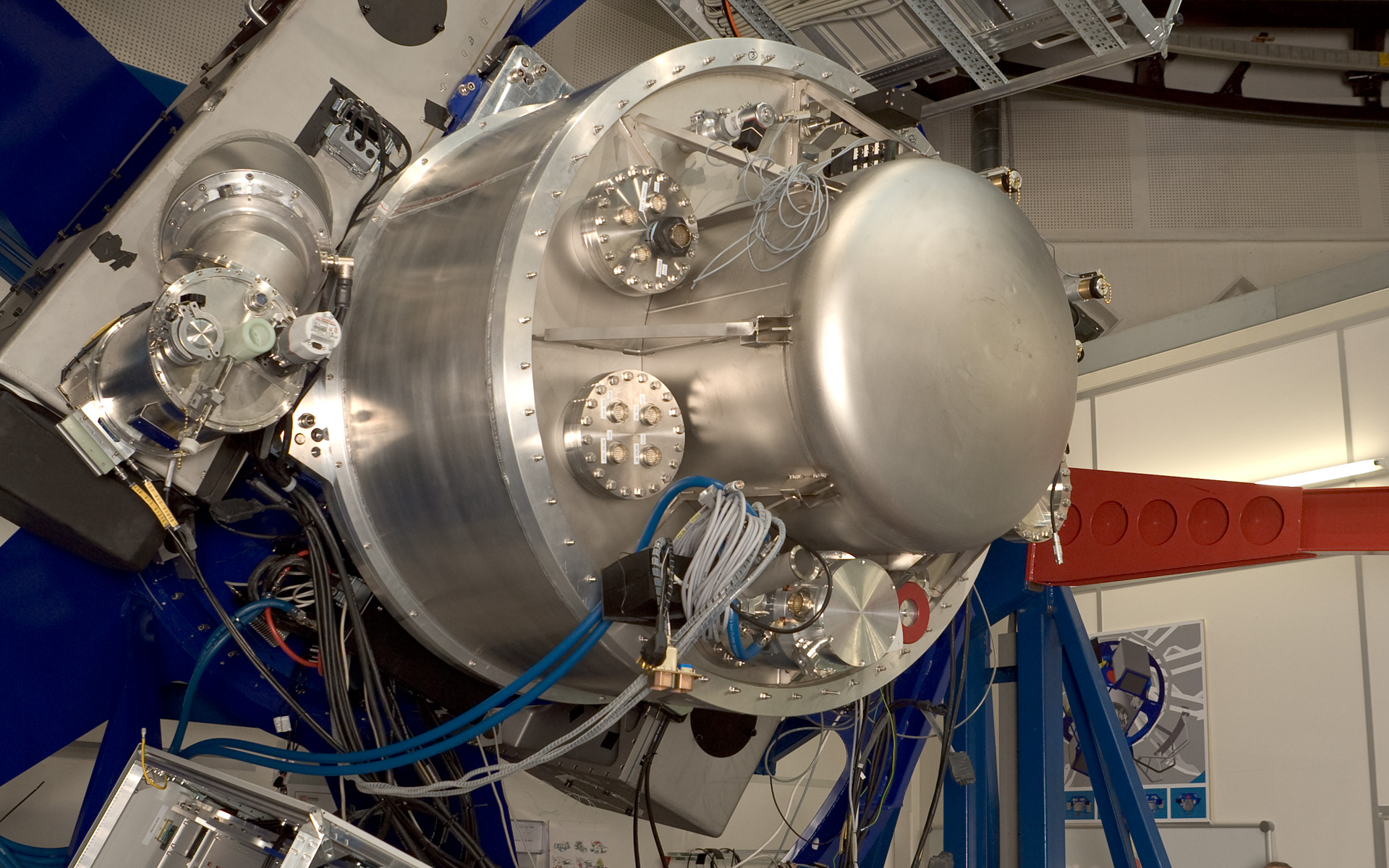
X-shooter spectrograph, 2009

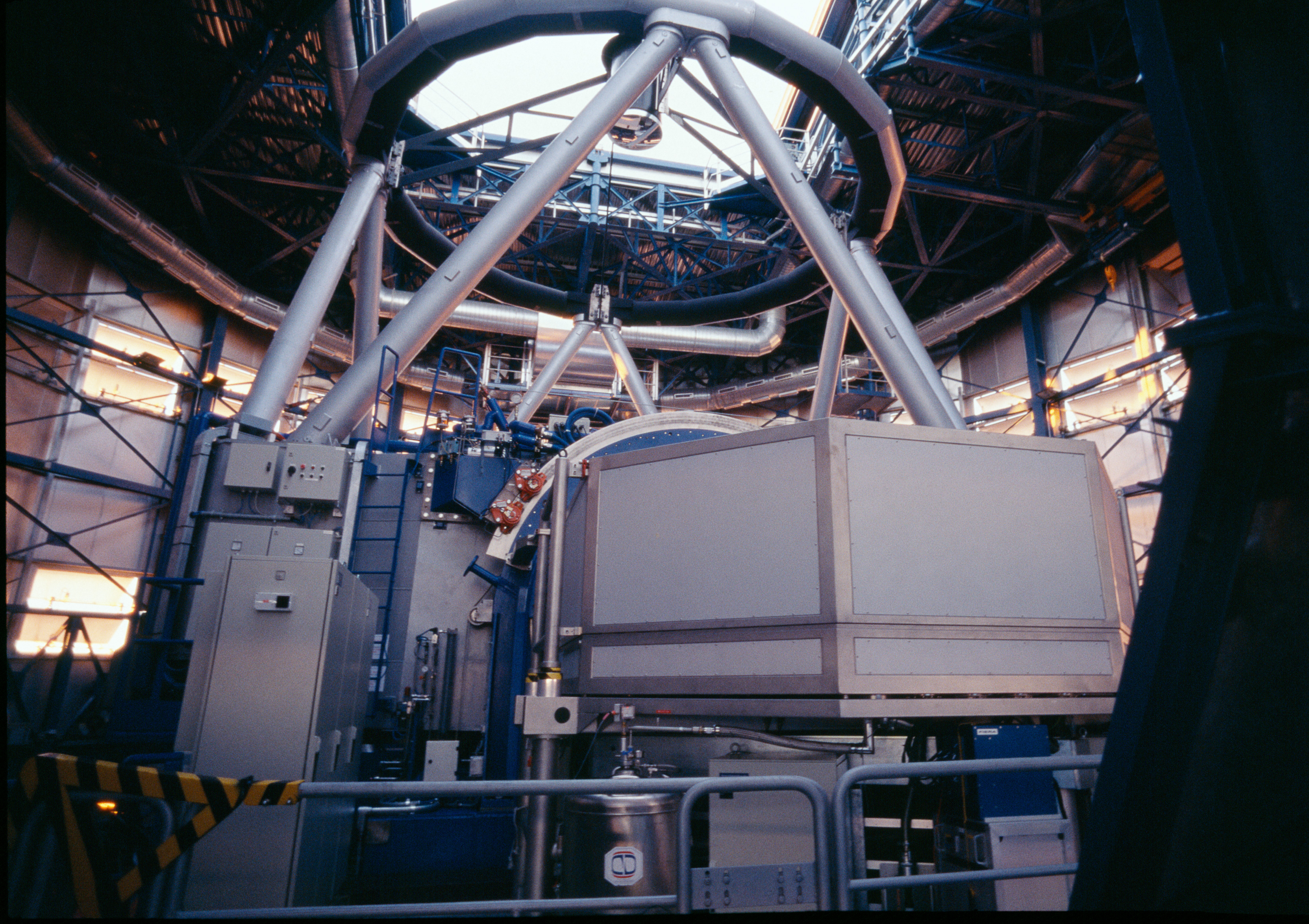
UVES spectrograph (UT2)

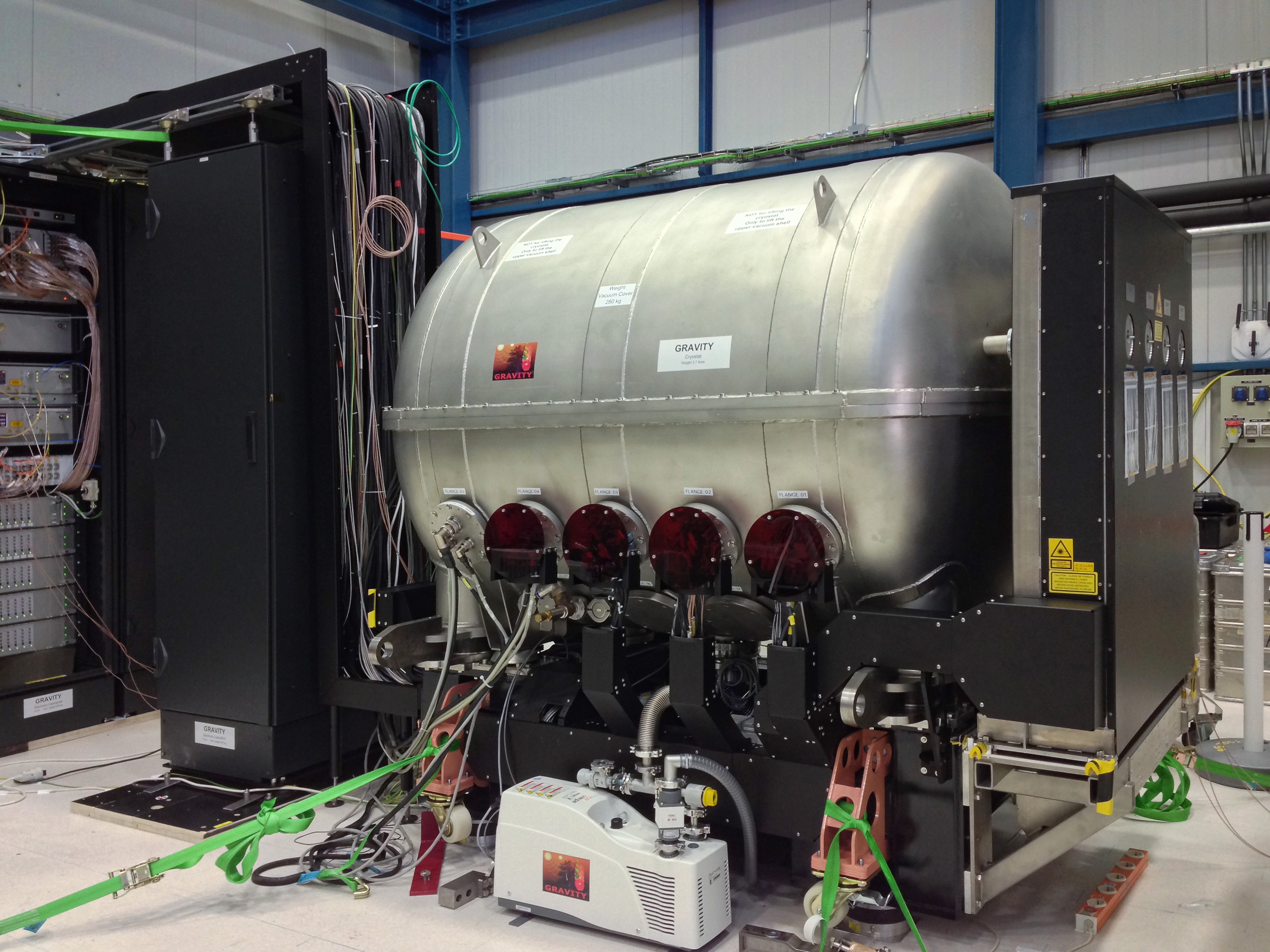
GRAVITY (interferometer)

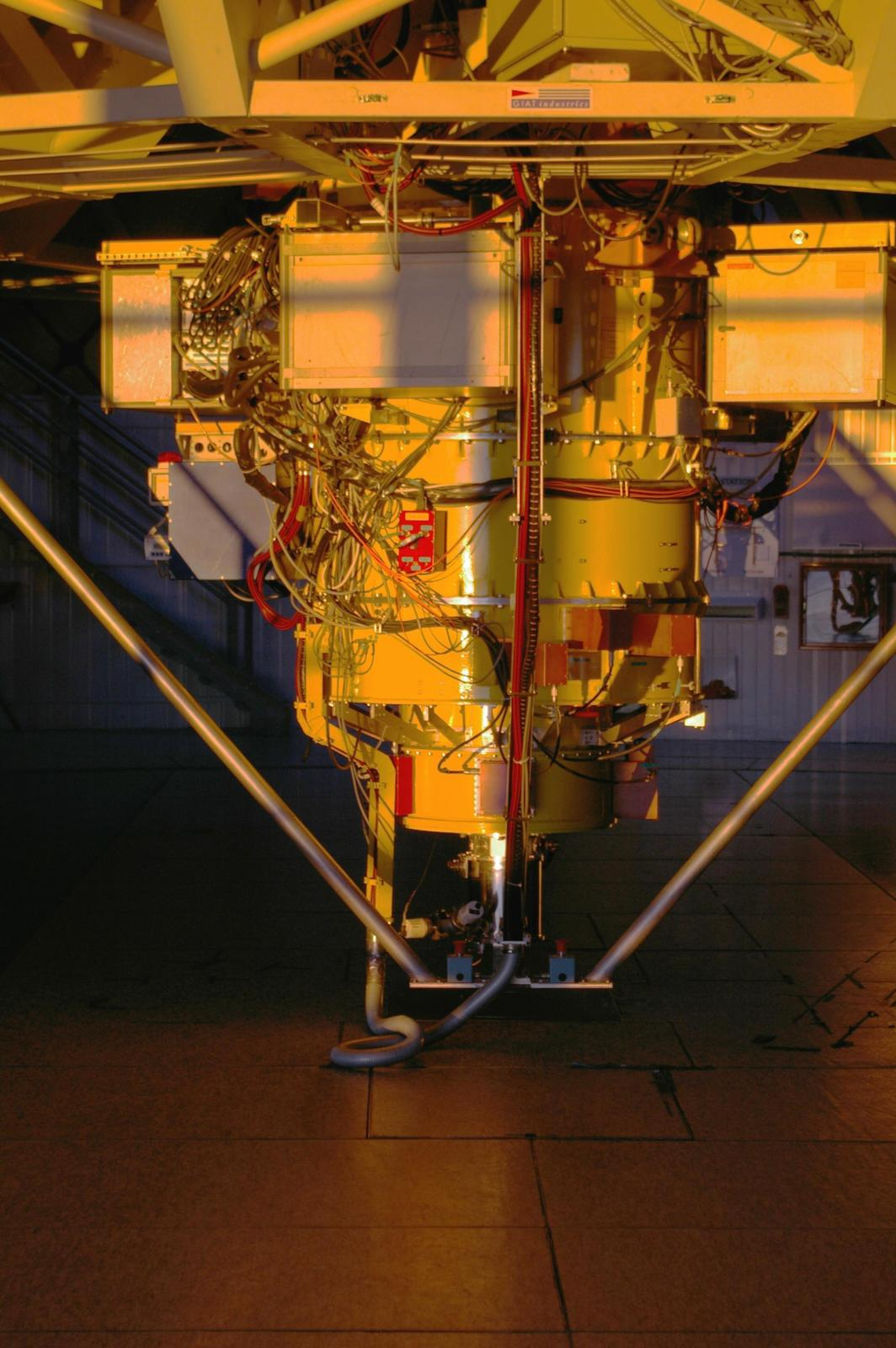
FORS-1 at the cassegrain focus (UT2)

The VLT instrumentation programme is the most ambitious programme ever conceived for a single observatory. It includes large-field imagers, adaptive optics corrected cameras and spectrographs, as well as high-resolution and multi-object spectrographs and covers a broad spectral region, from deep ultraviolet (300 nm) to mid-infrared (24 μm) wavelengths.

Instruments on the VLT (in 2023)
UT#	Telescope name	Cassegrain-Focus	Nasmyth-Focus A	Nasmyth-Focus B
1	Antu	FORS2		KMOS
2	Kueyen	VISIR	FLAMES	UVES
3	Melipal	XSHOOTER	SPHERE	CRIRES
4	Yepun	ERIS	HAWK-I	MUSE

In addition to these, GRAVITY and MATISSE are currently installed in the VLTI lab, along with ESPRESSO fed via fibre-optics (not interferometric).

AMBER (VLTI)
The astronomical multi-beam recombiner instrument combines three telescopes of the VLT at the same time, dispersing the light in a spectrograph to analyse the composition and shape of the observed object. AMBER is notably the "most-productive interferometric instrument ever". It has been decommissioned.
CRIRES and CRIRES+
The cryogenic infrared echelle spectrograph is an adaptive optics assisted echelle spectrograph. It provides a resolving power of up to 100,000 in the infrared spectral range from 1 to 5 micrometres.

From 2014 to 2020 it underwent a major upgrade to CRIRES+ to provide ten times larger simultaneous wavelength coverage. A new detector focal plane array of three Hawaii 2RG detectors with a 5.3 μm cut-off wavelength replaced the existing detectors, a new spectropolarimetric unit is added, and the calibration system is enhanced. One of the scientific objectives of CRIRES+ is in-transit spectroscopy of exoplanets, which currently provides us with the only means of studying exoplanetary atmospheres. Transiting planets are almost always close-in planets that are hot and radiate most of their light in the infrared (IR). Furthermore, the IR is a spectral region where lines of molecular gases like carbon monoxide (CO), ammonia (NH_{3}), and methane (CH_{4}), etc. are expected from the exoplanetary atmosphere. This important wavelength region is covered by CRIRES+, which will additionally allow tracking multiple absorption lines simultaneously.

ERIS
The enhanced resolution imager and spectrograph is the newest VLT instrument, which started science operation in 2023. It is an adaptive-optics assisted near-infrared imager (with coronagraph option) and integral-field spectrograph. It replaces the former NACO and SINFONI instruments with improved capability.
ESPRESSO
The echelle spectrograph for rocky exoplanet and stable spectroscopic observations is a high-resolution, fiber-fed and cross-dispersed echelle spectrograph for the visible wavelength range, capable of operating in 1-UT mode (using one of the four telescopes) and in 4-UT mode (using all four), for the search for rocky extra-solar planets in the habitable zone of their host stars. Its main feature is the spectroscopic stability and the radial-velocity precision. The requirement is to reach 10 cm/s, but the aimed goal is to obtain a precision level of few cm/s. ESPRESSO was installed and commissioned at the VLT in 2017–2018.
FLAMES
The fibre large array multi-element spectrograph is a multi-object fibre feed unit for UVES and GIRAFFE, the latter allowing the capability for simultaneously studying hundreds of individual stars in nearby galaxies at moderate spectral resolution in the visible.
FORS1/FORS2
The focal reducer and low dispersion spectrograph is a visible light camera and Multi Object Spectrograph with a 6.8 arcminute field of view. FORS2 is an upgraded version over FORS1 and includes further multi-object spectroscopy capabilities. FORS1 was retired in 2009 to make space for X-SHOOTER; FORS2 continues to operate as of 2021.
GRAVITY (VLTI)
GRAVITY is an adaptive optics assisted, near-infrared (NIR) instrument for micro-arcsecond precision narrow-angle astrometry and interferometric phase referenced imaging of faint celestial objects. This instrument interferometrically combines NIR light collected by four telescopes at the VLTI.
HAWK-I
The high acuity wide field K-band imager is a near-infrared imager with a relatively large field of view, about 8x8 arcminutes.
ISAAC
The infrared spectrometer and array camera was a near infrared imager and spectrograph; it operated successfully from 2000 to 2013 and was then retired to make way for SPHERE, since most of its capabilities can now be delivered by the newer HAWK-I or KMOS.
KMOS
KMOS (K-band Multi Object Spectrograph) is a cryogenic near-infrared multi-object spectrometer, observing 24 objects simultaneously, intended primarily for the study of distant galaxies.
MATISSE (VLTI)
The multi aperture mid-infrared spectroscopic experiment is an infrared spectro-interferometer of the VLT-Interferometer, which potentially combines the beams of all four Unit Telescopes (UTs) and four Auxiliary Telescopes (ATs). The instrument is used for image reconstruction. After 12 years of development It saw its first light at the telescope in Paranal in March 2018.
MIDI (VLTI)
MIDI is an instrument combining two telescopes of the VLT in the mid-infrared, dispersing the light in a spectrograph to analyse the dust composition and shape of the observed object. MIDI is notably the second most-productive interferometric instrument ever (surpassed by AMBER recently). MIDI was retired in March 2015 to prepare the VLTI for the arrival of GRAVITY and MATISSE.
MUSE
MUSE is a huge "3-dimensional" spectroscopic explorer which will provide complete visible spectra of all objects contained in "pencil beams" through the Universe.
NACO
NAOS-CONICA, NAOS meaning Nasmyth adaptive optics system and CONICA, meaning Coude near infrared camera) is an adaptive optics facility which produces infrared images as sharp as if taken in space and includes spectroscopic, polarimetric and coronagraphic capabilities.
PIONIER (VLTI)
Is an instrument to combine the light of all 8-metre telescopes, allowing to pick up details about 16 times finer than can be seen with one UT.
SINFONI
The spectrograph for integral field observations in the near infrared) was a medium resolution, near-infrared (1 to 2.5 micrometres) integral field spectrograph fed by an adaptive optics module. It operated from 2003, then retired in June 2019 to make space for the future ERIS.
SPHERE
The spectro-polarimetric high-contrast exoplanet research, a high-contrast adaptive optics system dedicated to the discovery and study of exoplanets.
ULTRACAM
ULTRACAM is a visitor instrument for ultra-high-speed photometry of variable objects. ULTRACAM provides three simultaneous bands of optical photometry.
UVES
The ultraviolet and visual echelle spectrograph is a high-resolution ultraviolet and visible light echelle spectrograph.
VIMOS
The visible multi-object spectrograph delivered visible images and spectra of up to 1,000 galaxies at a time in a 14 × 14 arcmin field of view. It was mainly used for several large redshift surveys of distant galaxies, including VVDS, zCOSMOS and VIPERS. It was retired in 2018 to make space for the return of CRIRES+.
VINCI (VLTI)
VINCI was a test instrument combining two telescopes of the VLT. It was the first-light instrument of the VLTI and is no longer in use.
VISIR
The VLT spectrometer and imager for the mid-infrared provides diffraction-limited imaging and spectroscopy at a range of resolutions in the 10 and 20 micrometre mid-infrared (MIR) atmospheric windows. VISIR hosts the NEAR science demonstration, where NEAR stands for "New Earths in the Alpha Centauri Region".
X-Shooter
X-Shooter is the first second-generation instrument, operating since 2009. It is a very wide-band [UV to near infrared] single-object spectrometer designed to explore the properties of rare, unusual or unidentified sources.

Instrument summary (as of 2019)
Instrument	Type	Wavelength range (nm)	Resolution (arcsec)	Spectral resolution	First light	Unit	Position
ESPRESSO	Spectrometer	380–780	4	140000–180000	27 November 2017	1/all	Coude
FLAMES	Multi-object spectrometer	370–950	n/a	7500–30000	Aug 2002	UT2	Nasmyth A
FORS2	Imager/Spectrometer	330–1100	0.125	260–1600	1999	UT1	Cassegrain
GRAVITY	Imager	2000–2400	0.003	22, 500, 4500	2015	all	Interferometer
HAWK-I	Near-IR Imager	900–2500	0.106		31 July 2006	UT4	Nasmyth A
KMOS	Near-IR Spectrometer	800–2500	0.2	1500–5000	Nov 2012	UT1	Nasmyth B
MUSE	Integral-field Spectrometer	365–930	0.2	1700–3400	Mar 2014	UT4	Nasmyth B
NACO	AO Imager/Spectrometer	800–2500		400–1100	Oct 2001	UT1	Nasmyth A
PIONIER	Imager	1500–2400	0.0025		Oct 2010	all	Interferometer
SINFONI	Near-IR IFU	1000–2500	0.05	1500–4000	Aug 2004	UT4	Cassegrain
SPHERE	AO	500–2320	0.02	30–350	4 May 2014	UT3	Nasmyth A
UVES	UV/Vis Spectrometer	300–500, 420–1100	0.16	80000–110000	Sep 1999	UT2	Nasmyth B
VIMOS	Imager/Multislit Spectrometer	360–1000, 1100–1800	0.205	200–2500	26 February 2002	UT3	Nasmyth B
VISIR	Mid-IR Spectrometer	16500–24500			2004	UT3	Cassegrain
X-SHOOTER	UV-NIR Spectrometer	300–2500		4000–17000	Mar 2009	UT2	Cassegrain

=== Interferometry ===
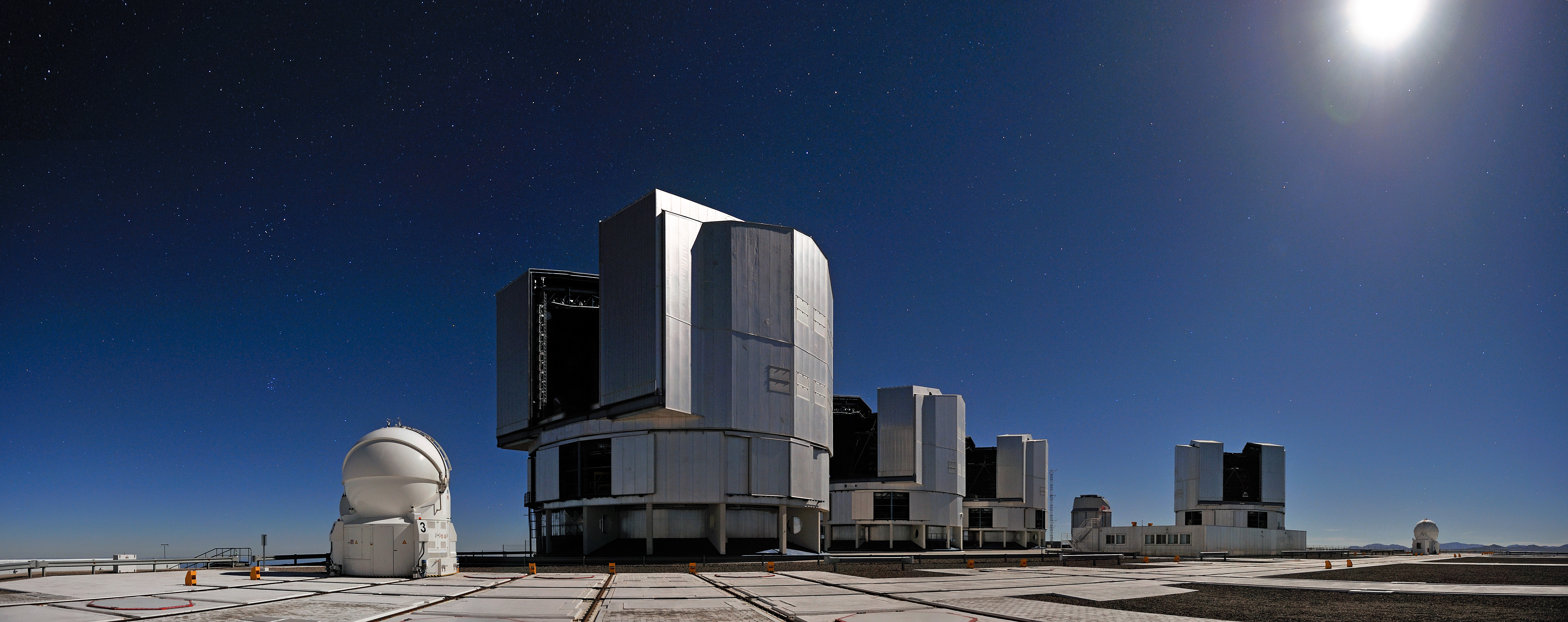
All four 8.2-metre Unit Telescopes and 1.8-metre Auxiliary Telescopes were connected for the first time on 17 March 2011, becoming the VLT Interferometer (VLTI) with six baselines.

In its interferometric operating mode, the light from the telescopes is reflected off mirrors and directed through tunnels to a central beam combining laboratory. In the year 2001, during commissioning, the VLTI successfully measured the angular diameters of four red dwarfs including Proxima Centauri. During this operation it achieved an angular resolution of ±0.08 milli-arc-seconds (0.388 nano-radians). This is comparable to the resolution achieved using other arrays such as the Navy Prototype Optical Interferometer and the CHARA array. Unlike many earlier optical and infrared interferometers, the Astronomical Multi-Beam Recombiner (AMBER) instrument on VLTI was initially designed to perform coherent integration (which requires signal-to-noise greater than one in each atmospheric coherence time). Using the big telescopes and coherent integration, the faintest object the VLTI can observe is magnitude 7 in the near infrared for broadband observations, similar to many other near infrared / optical interferometers without fringe tracking. In 2011, an incoherent integration mode was introduced called AMBER "blind mode", which is more similar to the observation mode used at earlier interferometer arrays such as COAST, IOTA and CHARA. In this "blind mode", AMBER can observe sources as faint as K=10 in medium spectral resolution. At more challenging mid-infrared wavelengths, the VLTI can reach magnitude 4.5, significantly fainter than the Infrared Spatial Interferometer. When fringe tracking is introduced, the limiting magnitude of the VLTI is expected to improve by a factor of almost 1000, reaching a magnitude of about 14. This is similar to what is expected for other fringe tracking interferometers. In spectroscopic mode, the VLTI can currently reach a magnitude of 1.5. The VLTI can work in a fully integrated way, so that interferometric observations are actually quite simple to prepare and execute. The VLTI has become worldwide the first general user optical/infrared interferometric facility offered with this kind of service to the astronomical community.

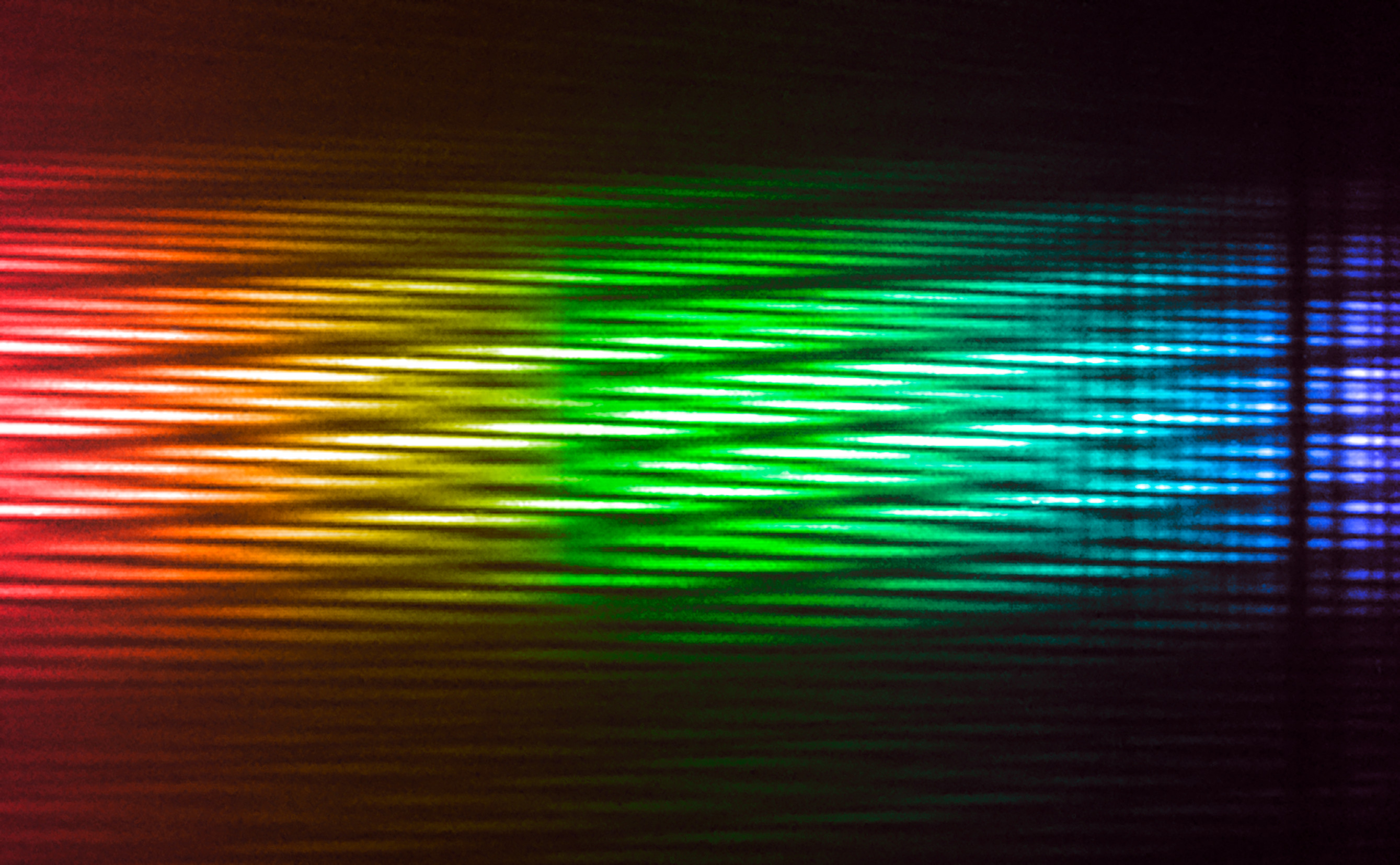
First light for MATISSE interferometric instrument

Because of the many mirrors involved in the optical train, about 95% of the light is lost before reaching the instruments at a wavelength of 1 μm, 90% at 2 μm and 75% at 10 μm. This refers to reflection off 32 surfaces including the Coudé train, the star separator, the main delay line, beam compressor and feeding optics. Additionally, the interferometric technique is such that it is very efficient only for objects that are small enough that all their light is concentrated.

For instance, an object with a relatively low surface brightness such as the moon cannot be observed, because its light is too diluted. Only targets which are at temperatures of more than 1,000 °C (1,800 °F) have a surface brightness high enough to be observed in the mid-infrared, and objects must be at several thousands of degrees Celsius for near-infrared observations using the VLTI. This includes most of the stars in the solar neighborhood and many extragalactic objects such as bright active galactic nuclei, but this sensitivity limit rules out interferometric observations of most solar-system objects. Although the use of large telescope diameters and adaptive optics correction can improve the sensitivity, this cannot extend the reach of optical interferometry beyond nearby stars and the brightest active galactic nuclei.

Because the Unit Telescopes are used most of the time independently, they are used in the interferometric mode mostly during bright time (that is, close to full moon). At other times, interferometry is done using 1.8-metre Auxiliary Telescopes (ATs), which are dedicated to full-time interferometric measurements. The first observations using a pair of ATs were conducted in February 2005, and all the four ATs have now been commissioned. For interferometric observations on the brightest objects, there is little benefit in using 8 meter telescopes rather than 1.8-metre telescopes.

The first two instruments at the VLTI were VINCI (a test instrument used to set up the system, now decommissioned) and MIDI, which only allow two telescopes to be used at any one time. With the installation of the three-telescope AMBER closure-phase instrument in 2005, the first imaging observations from the VLTI are expected soon.

Deployment of the Phase Referenced Imaging and Microarcsecond Astrometry (PRIMA) instrument started 2008 with the aim to allow phase-referenced measurements in either an astrometric two-beam mode or as a fringe-tracker successor to VINCI, operated concurrent with one of the other instruments.

After falling drastically behind schedule and failing to meet some specifications, in December 2004 the VLT Interferometer became the target of a second ESO "recovery plan". This involves additional effort concentrated on improvements to fringe tracking and the performance of the main delay lines. Note that this only applies to the interferometer and not other instruments on Paranal. In 2005, the VLTI was routinely producing observations, although with a brighter limiting magnitude and poorer observing efficiency than expected.

As of March 2008, the VLTI had already led to the publication of 89 peer-reviewed publications and had published a first-ever image of the inner structure of the mysterious Eta Carinae. In March 2011, the PIONIER instrument for the first time simultaneously combined the light of the four Unit Telescopes, potentially making VLTI the biggest optical telescope in the world. However, this attempt was not really a success. The first successful attempt was in February 2012, with four telescopes combined into a 130-metre diameter mirror.

In March 2019, ESO astronomers, employing the GRAVITY instrument on their Very Large Telescope Interferometer (VLTI), announced the first direct detection of an exoplanet, HR 8799 e, using optical interferometry.

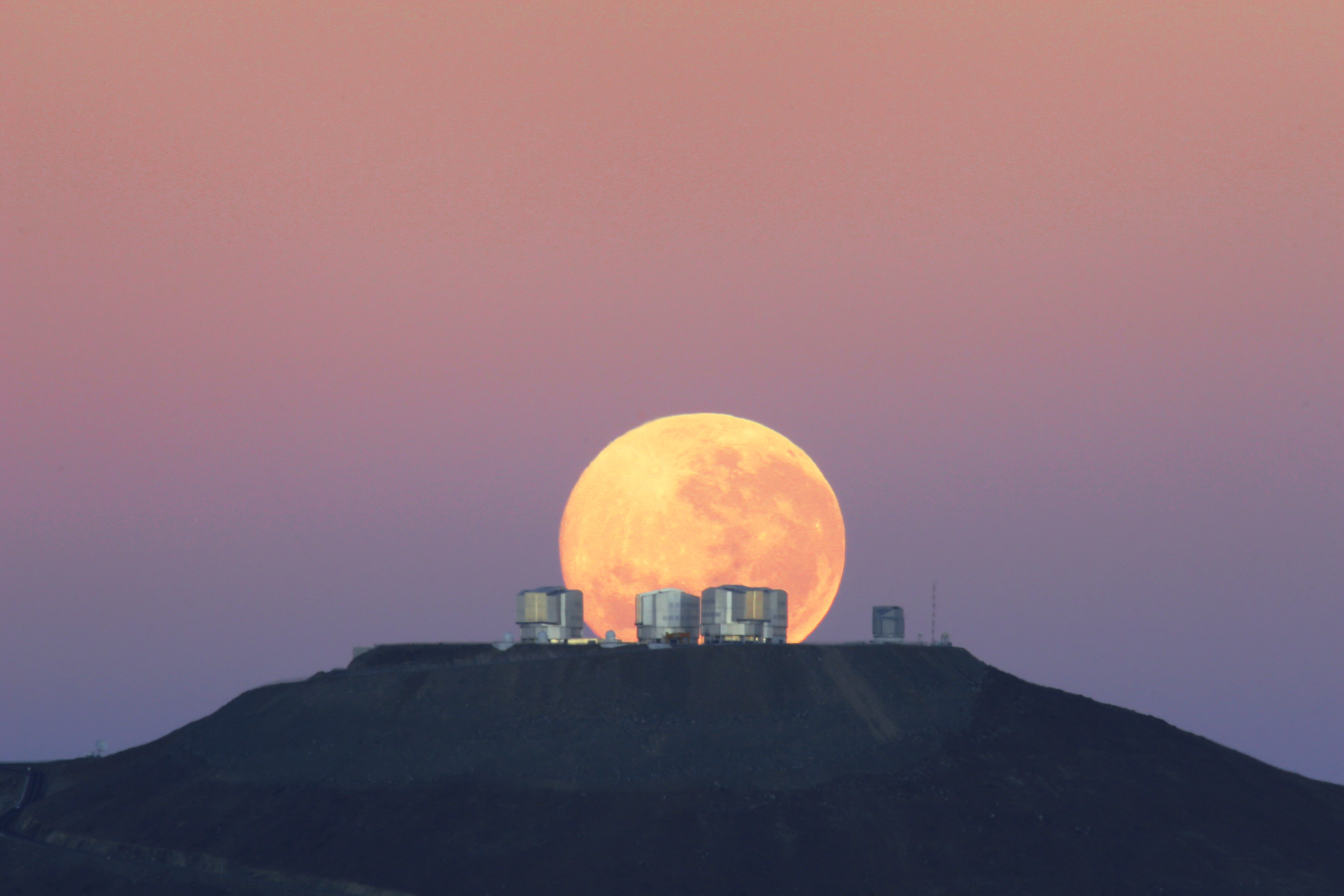
Moonset over Cerro Paranal

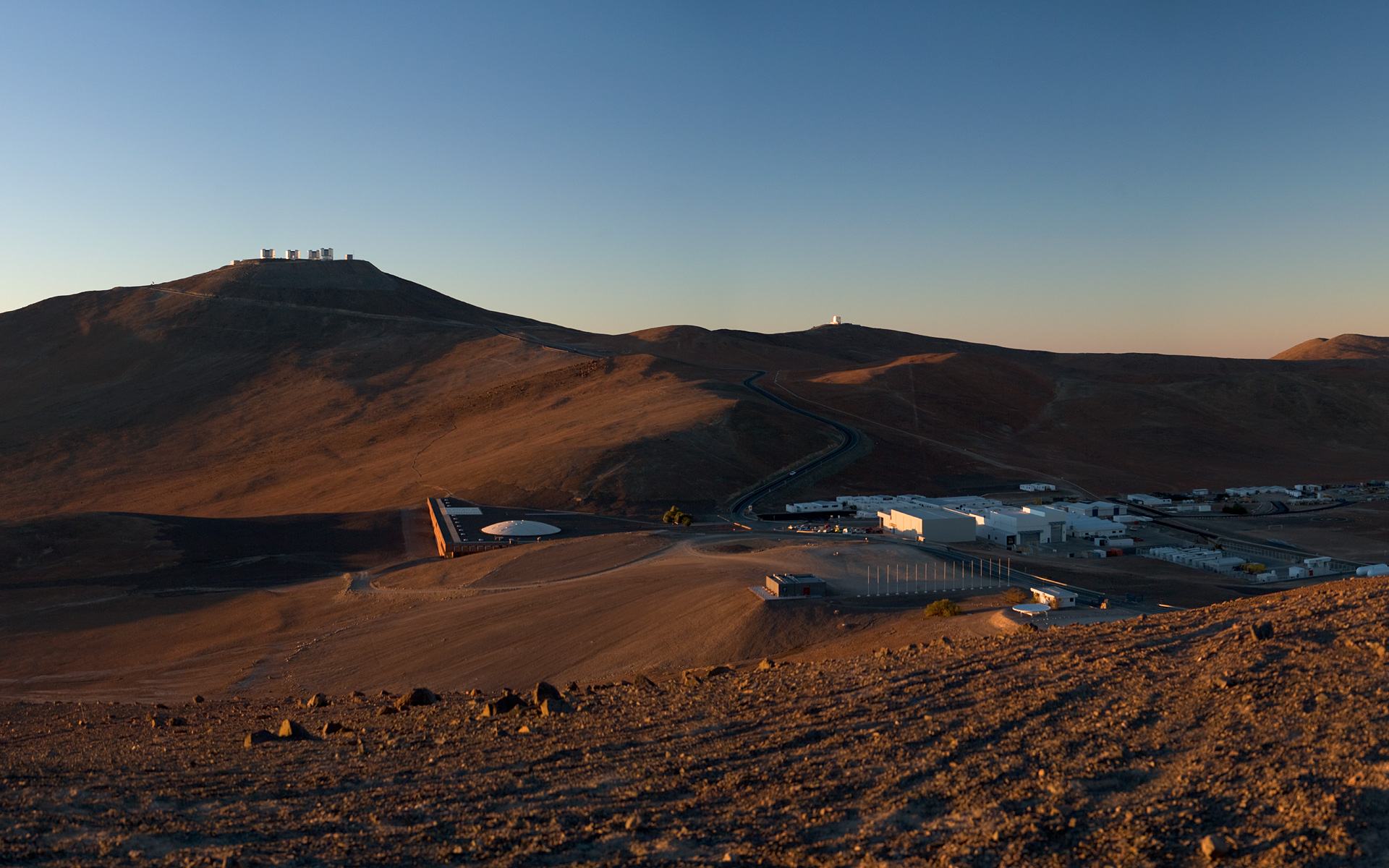
The Paranal Residencia and Basecamp at 2,400 meters (7,900 ft)

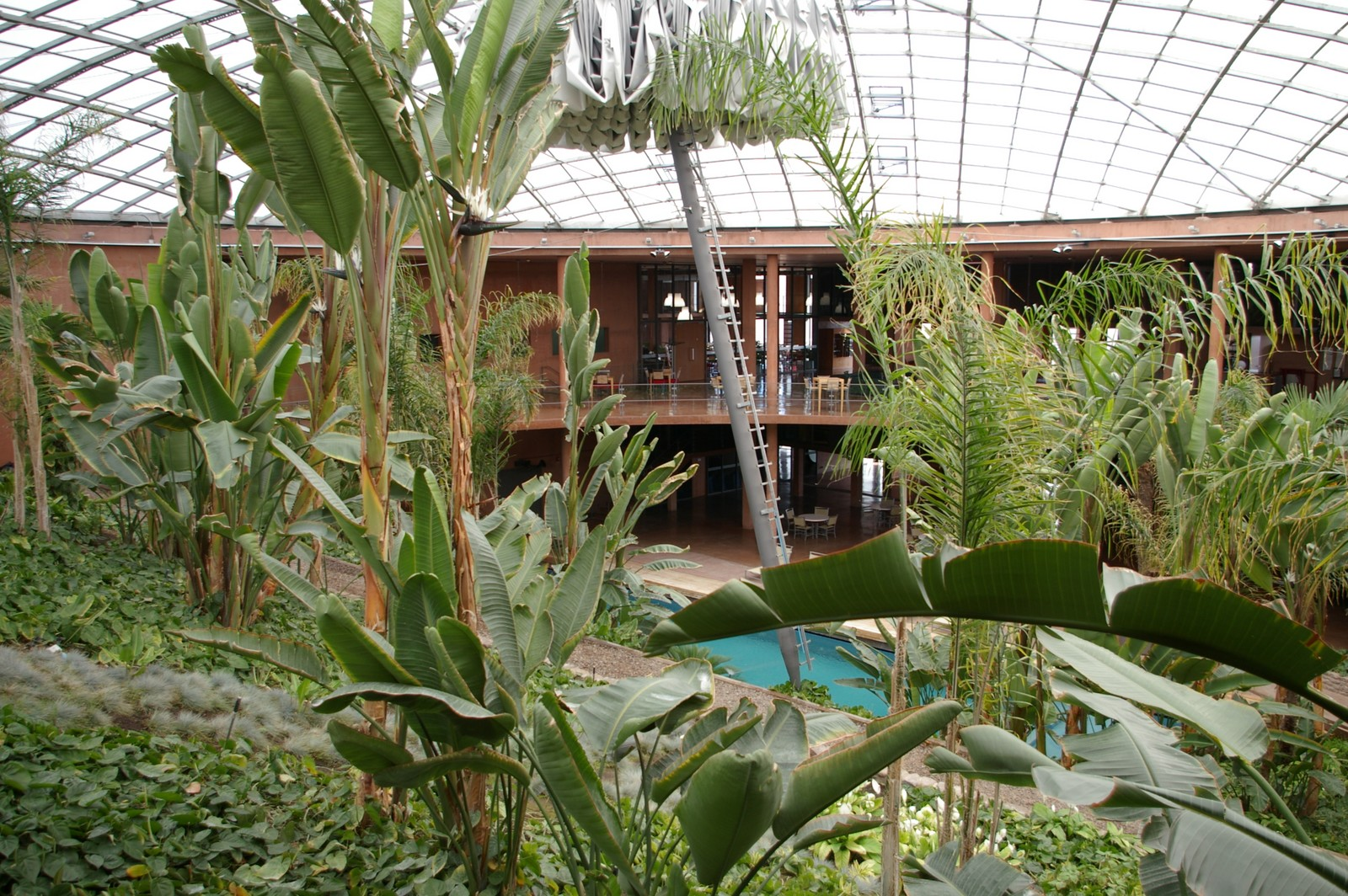
Inside the Paranal Residencia

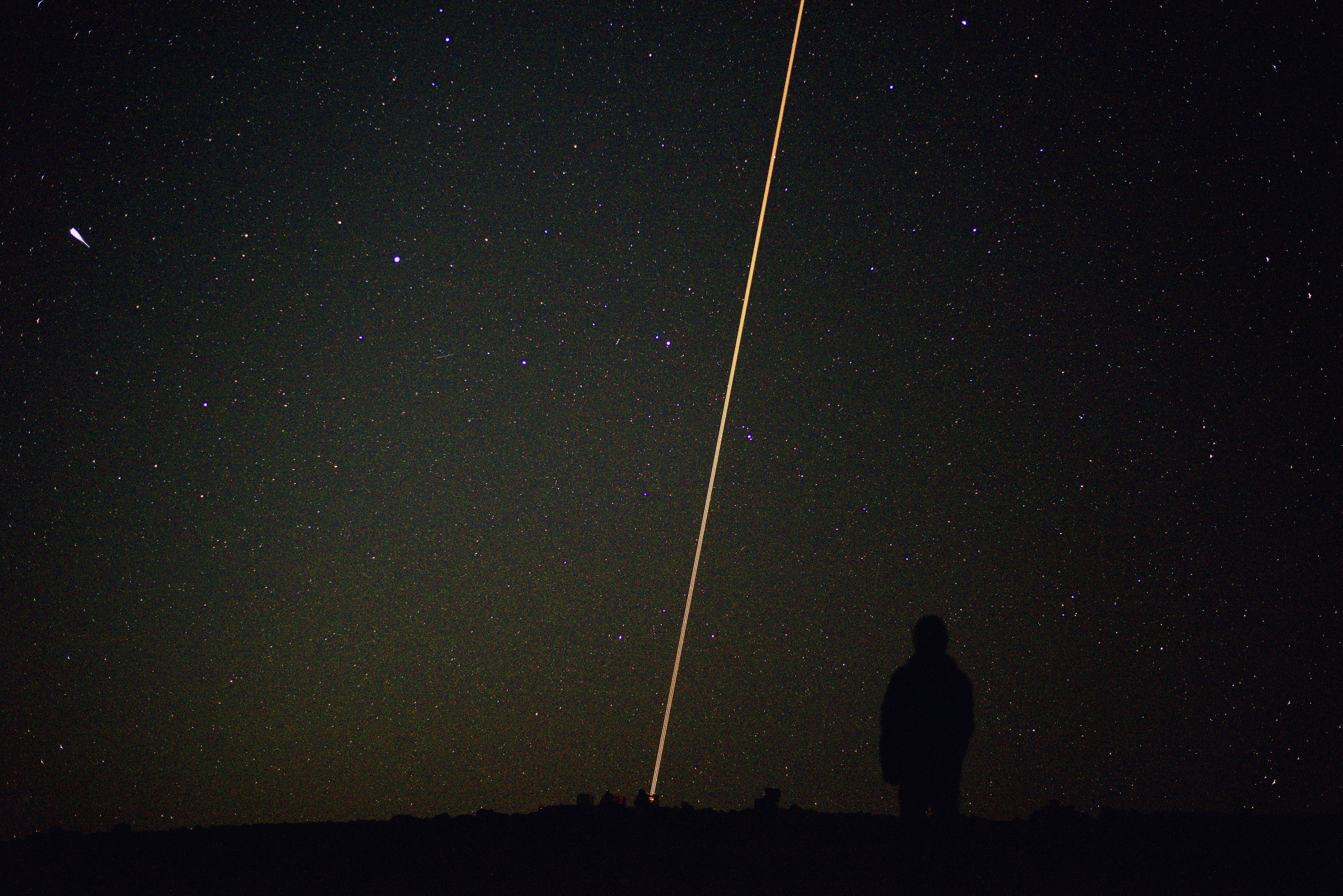
A wide view of the VLT with its laser in operation

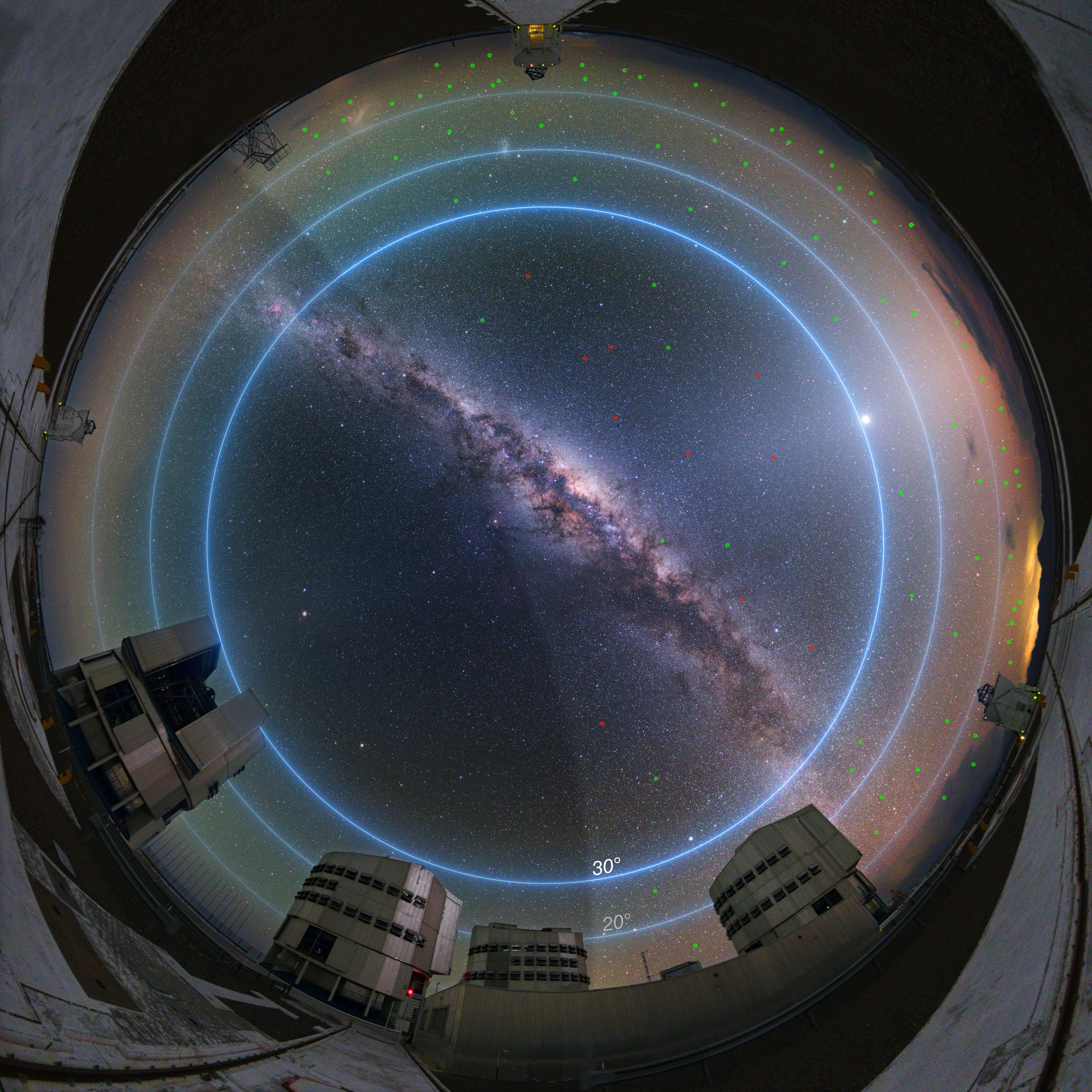
The night sky at ESO's Paranal Observatory around twilight

== Cancelled planned industrial complex ==
In 2024, AES Andes, a utility company, proposed a green energy megaproject known as INNA, located 11 km away from the VLT. The proposal drew heavy criticism from the astronomical community due to threats posed by light pollution, increased atmospheric turbulence generated by wind turbines, vibrations, and construction dust would severely disrupt operations at both the VLT and the future Extremely Large Telescope. Following the opposition, AES Andes announced the cancellation of the INNA project in January 2026 and formally withdrew it from Chile's Environmental Assessment Service the following month.

== In popular culture ==
One of the large mirrors of the telescopes was the subject of an episode of the National Geographic Channel's reality series World's Toughest Fixes, where a crew of engineers removed and transported the mirror to be cleaned and re-coated with aluminium. The job required battling strong winds, fixing a broken pump in a giant washing machine and resolving a rigging issue. The procedure is part of routine scheduled maintenance.

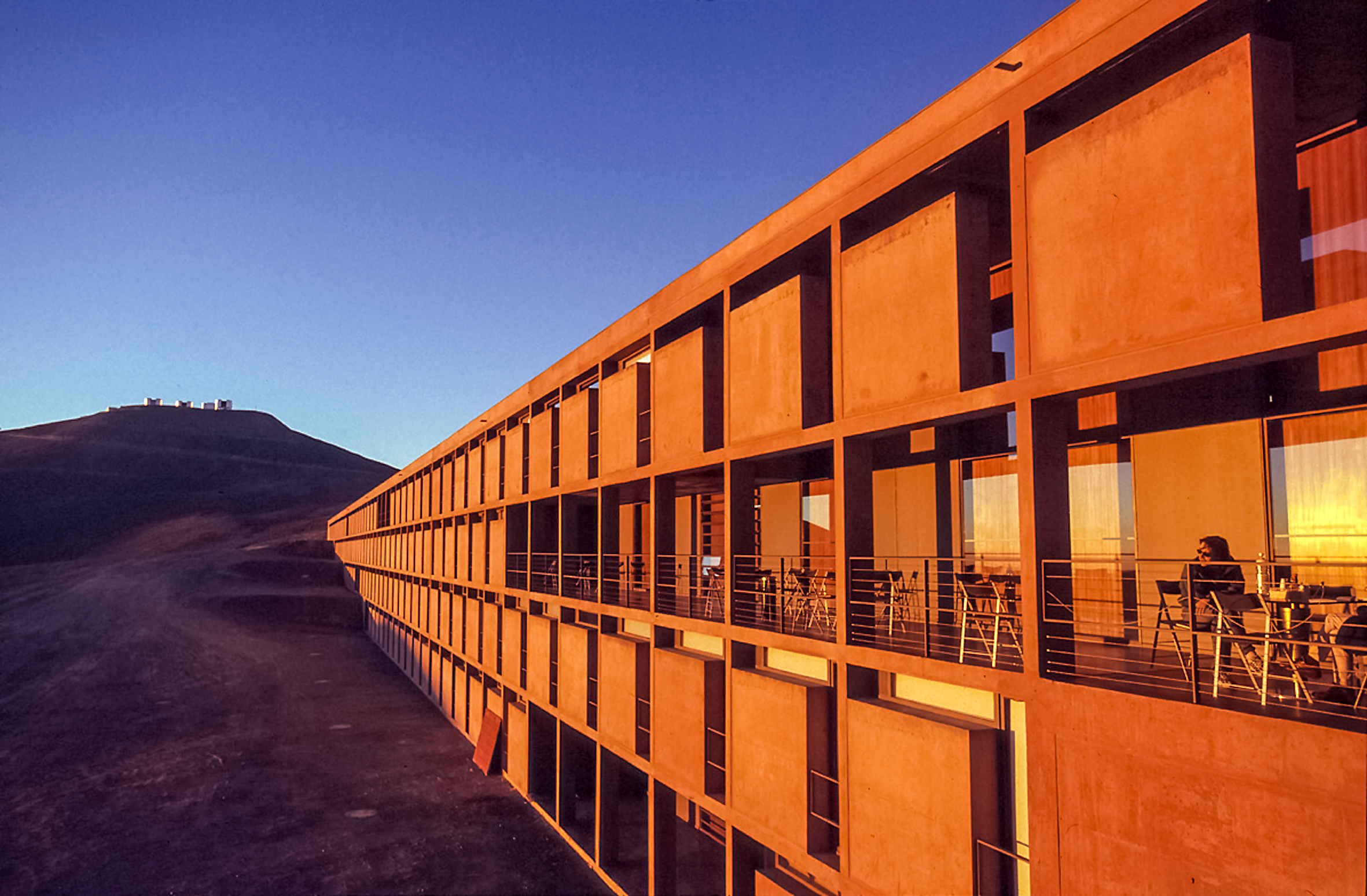
ESO Hotel west facade

The area surrounding the Very Large Telescope was featured in the 2008 film Quantum of Solace. The ESO Hotel, the Residencia, served as a backdrop for part of the James Bond movie. Producer Michael G. Wilson said: "The Residencia of Paranal Observatory caught the attention of our director, Marc Forster and production designer, Dennis Gassner, both for its exceptional design and its remote location in the Atacama desert. It is a true oasis and the perfect hide out for Dominic Greene, our villain, whom 007 is tracking in our new James Bond film."

== See also ==
Size comparison of primary mirrors. The dotted line shows the theoretical size of the VLT's combined mirrors (dark green).

- VLT Survey Telescope
- Cerro Tololo Inter-American Observatory
- Extremely large telescope
- European Extremely Large Telescope
- Thirty Meter Telescope
- Giant Magellan Telescope
- La Silla Observatory
- List of deep fields
- List of largest optical reflecting telescopes
- Llano de Chajnantor Observatory
- Mauna Kea Observatories
- Overwhelmingly Large Telescope
- Paranal Observatory
- Roque de los Muchachos Observatory
