= K-band multi-object spectrograph =

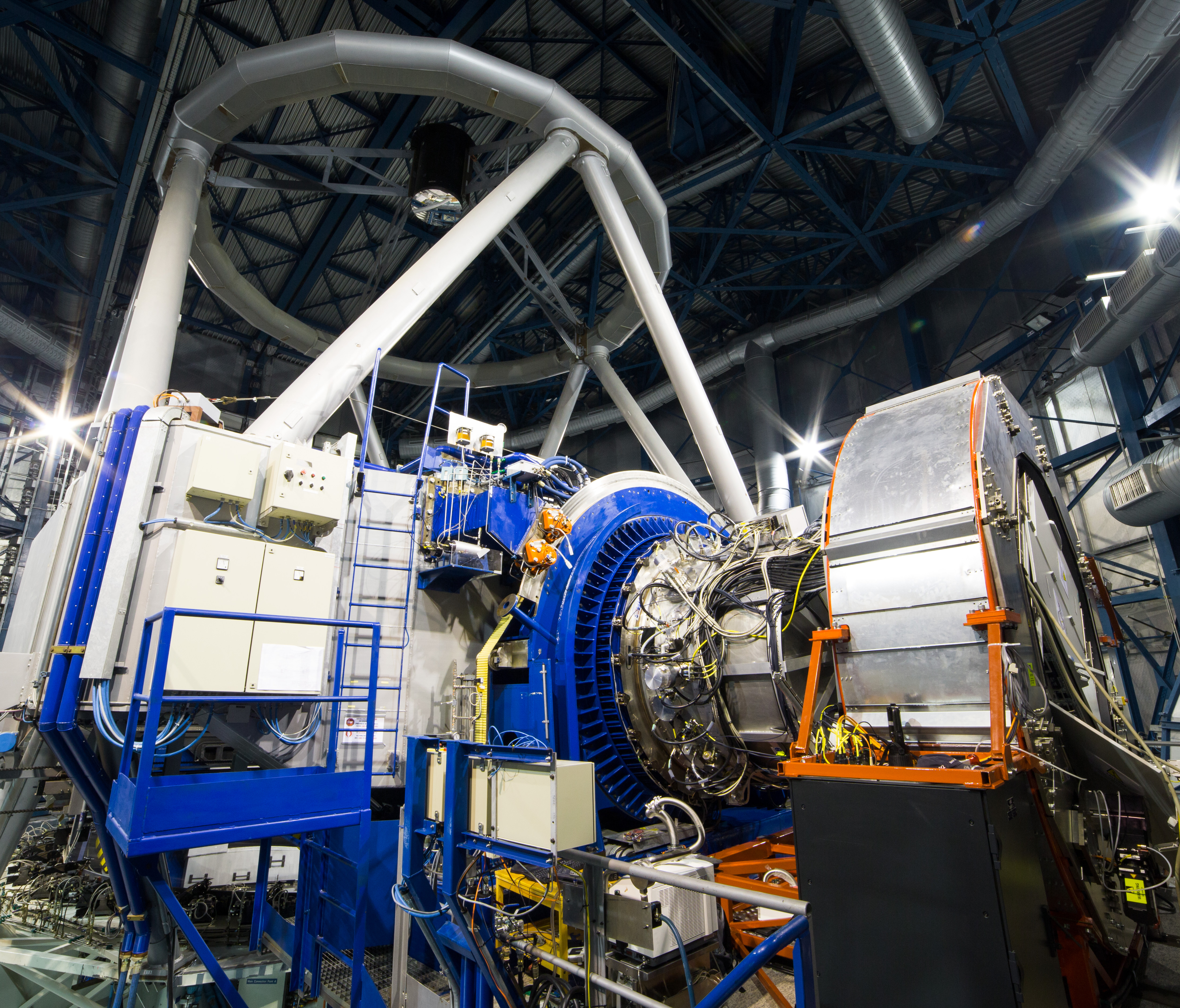
KMOS on the VLT Antu (UT1) at the time of first light in 2012

The K-band multi-object spectrograph, or KMOS for short, is an instrument mounted on ESO’s Very Large Telescope Antu (UT1) at the Paranal Observatory in Chile. KMOS is a multi-object spectrograph able to observe 24 objects at the same time in infrared light and to map out how their properties vary from place to place. It will provide crucial data to help understand how galaxies grew and evolved in the early Universe.
