= LAMOST =

Schmidt telescope in China

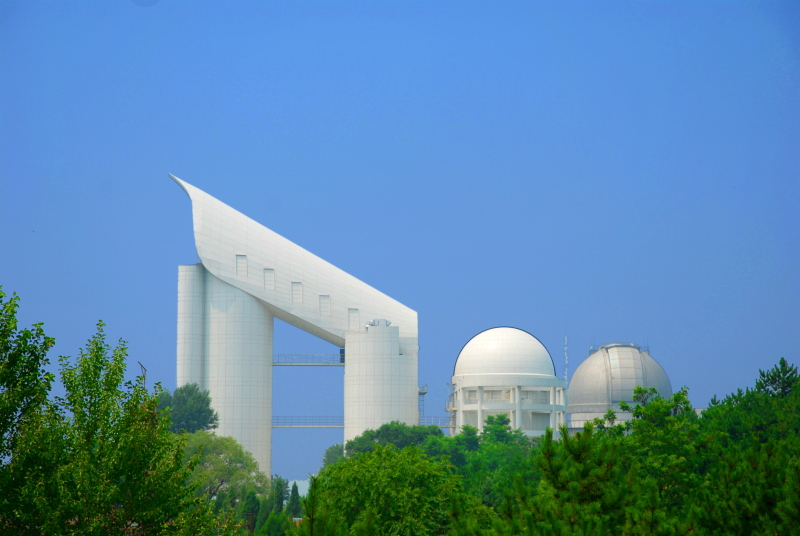
- The LAMOST telescope
- Location: People's Republic of China
- Coordinates: 40°23′45″N 117°34′33″E
- Altitude: 960 m (3,150 ft)
- Wavelength: 370 nm (810 THz)–900 nm (330 THz)
- Built: September 2001–October 2008
- Diameter: 4 m (13 ft 1 in)
- Secondary diameter: 6 m (19 ft 8 in)
- Collecting area: 18.86 m^{2} (203.0 sq ft)
- Focal length: 20 m (65 ft 7 in)
- Location within China
- Related media on Commons

Comparison of nominal sizes of apertures of LAMOST (in red) and some notable optical telescopes

The Large Sky Area Multi-Object Fiber Spectroscopic Telescope (LAMOST), also known as the Guo Shoujing Telescope (Chinese: 郭守敬望远镜) after the 13th-century Chinese astronomer, is a meridian reflecting Schmidt telescope, located in Xinglong Station, Hebei Province, China. Undertaken by the Chinese Academy of Sciences, the telescope is planned to conduct a 5-year spectroscopic survey of 10 million Milky Way stars, as well as millions of galaxies. The project's budget is RMB 235 million yuan.

== Optics ==
LAMOST is configured as a reflective Schmidt telescope with active optics. There are two mirrors, each made up of a number of 1.1-metre (p-p) hexagonal deformable segments. The first mirror, MA (24 segments, fitting in a 5.72×4.4 m rectangle) is a Schmidt corrector plate in a dome at ground level. The almost-flat mirror MA reflects the light to the south, up a large slanted tunnel (25° above horizontal) to the larger spherical focusing mirror MB (37 segments, fitting in a 6.67×6.09 m rectangle). This directs light to a focal plane 1.75 metres in diameter corresponding to a five-degree field of view. The focal plane is tiled with 4000 fiber-positioning units, each feeding an optical fiber which transfers light to one of sixteen 250-channel spectrographs below.

Looking at the image opposite, MB is at the top of the left-hand supporting column of the tower, MA is in the left of the two domes at the right of the image (the rightmost, grey dome is an unrelated telescope), and the spectrographs are inside the right-hand column of the tower.

Each spectrograph has two 4k×4k CCD cameras, using e2v CCD chips, with 'blue' (370–590 nm) and 'red' (570–900 nm) sides; the telescope can also be used in a higher spectral resolution mode where the range is 510–540 and 830–890 nm.

The telescope uses active optics to control its reflecting corrector, resulting in it combining a large aperture with a wide field of view. The available large focal plane may accommodate up to thousands of fibers, by which the collected light of celestial objects down to 20.5 magnitude is fed into the spectrographs, resulting in a spectrum acquiring rate of ten-thousands of spectra per night.

== Scientific goals ==
The telescope is to conduct a wide-field survey, called the "LAMOST Experiment for Galactic Understanding and Evolution," or LEGUE. Particular scientific goals of the LAMOST include:

- An extra-galactic spectroscopic survey to shed light on the large scale structure of the universe
- A stellar spectroscopic survey, including a search for metal-poor stars in the galactic halo, to provide information on the structure of our Galaxy
- Cross-identification of multi-waveband surveys

It is also hoped that the vast volume of data produced will lead to additional serendipitous discoveries. Early commissioning observations have been able to confirm spectroscopically a new method of identifying quasars based on their infrared color. An overarching goal of the telescope is to bring Chinese astronomy into the 21st century, taking a leading role in wide-field spectroscopy and in the fields of large-scale and large-sample astronomy and astrophysics.

== Early results ==
A 2011 conference presentation suggests that there was initially a problem with accuracy of the fiber positioners causing poor throughput, but that this was rectified by adding another calibration step.

The same presentation also points out that the telescope's location, only 115 km (71 mi) NW of Beijing, is far from ideal, being in an area with high levels of both atmospheric and light pollution. The telescope has generally been disappointing, with the site receiving only 120 clear nights per year.

The first LAMOST data release occurred in June 2013 (DR1). Subsequent data releases occurred in 2014 (DR2), 2015 (DR3), 2016 (DR4), 2017 (DR5), 2018 (DR6), 2019 (DR7), and the most recent data release, DR8, occurred in May 2020.

== See also ==
- List of largest optical reflecting telescopes
