= Multi-Object Spectrometer =

Method in astronomy

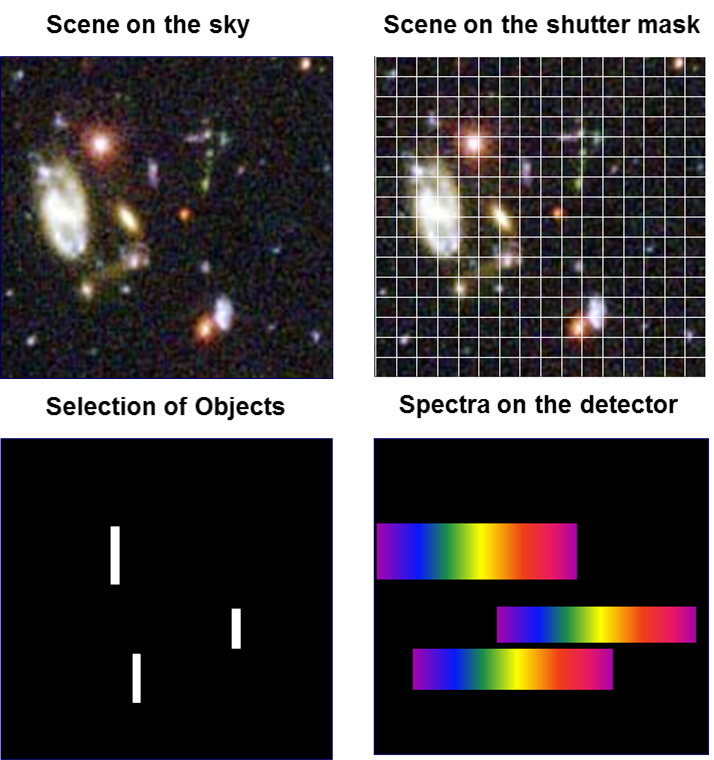
Basic principle of multi-object spectroscopy

A multi-object spectrometer is a type of optical spectrometer capable of simultaneously acquiring the spectra of multiple separate objects in its field of view. It is used in astronomical spectroscopy and is related to long-slit spectroscopy. This technique became available in the 1980s.

== Description ==
The term multi-object spectrograph is commonly used for spectrographs using a bundle of fibers to image part of the field. The entrance of the fibers is at the focal plane of the imaging instrument. The bundle is then reshaped; the individual fibers are aligned at the entrance slit of a spectrometer, dispersing the light on a detector.

This technique is closely related to integral field spectrography (IFS), more specifically to fiber-IFS. It is a form of snapshot hyperspectral imaging, itself a part of imaging spectroscopy.

=== Apertures ===
External image
- Photographs of the Configurable Slit Unit on MOSFIRE Left: full picture, in a configuration for imaging. Right: close-up on the knife-edge slits.

Typically, the apertures of multi-object spectrographs can be modified to fit the needs of the given observation.

For example, the MOSFIRE (Multi-Object Spectrometer for Infra-Red Exploration ) instrument on the W. M. Keck Observatory contains the Configurable Slit Unit (CSU) allowing arbitrary positioning of up to forty-six 18 cm slits by moving opposable bars.

Some fiber-fed spectroscopes, such as the Large Sky Area Multi-Object Fibre Spectroscopic Telescope (LAMOST) can move the fibers to desired position. The LAMOST moves its 4000 fibers separately within designated areas for the requirements of a measurement, and can correct positioning errors in real time.

The James Webb Space Telescope uses a fixed Micro-Shutter Assembly (MSA), an array of nearly 250000 5.1 mm by 11.7 mm shutters that can independently be opened or closed to change the location of the open slits on the device.

== Uses in telescopes ==
=== Ground-based instruments ===
Instruments with multi-object spectrometry capabilities are available on most 8-10 meter-class ground-based observatories. For example, the Large Binocular Telescope, W. M. Keck Observatory, Gran Telescopio Canarias, Gemini Observatory, New Technology Telescope, William Herschel Telescope, UK Schmidt Telescope and LAMOST include such system.

Four instruments in the Very Large Telescope, including the KMOS (K-band multi-object spectrograph) and the VIMOS (Visible Multi Object Spectrograph) instruments, have multi-object spectroscopic capabilities.

=== Space-based instruments ===
The Hubble Space Telescope has been operating the NICMOS (Near Infrared Camera and Multi-Object Spectrometer) from 1997 to 1999 and from 2002 to 2008.

The James Webb Space Telescope's NIRSpec (Near-Infrared Spectrograph) instrument is a multi-object spectrometer.
