= AMBER (Very Large Telescope) =

Instrument mounted on the Very Large Telescope

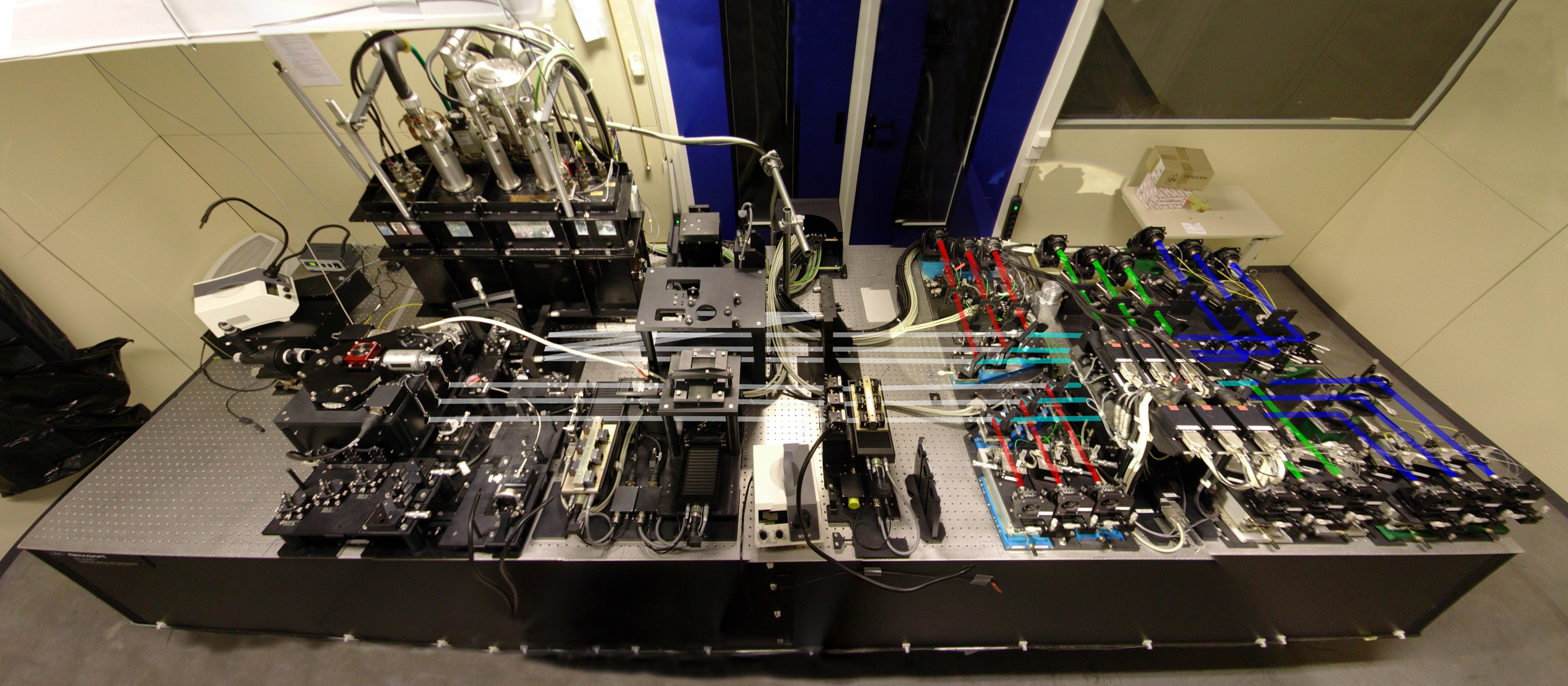
AMBER before its installation at the VLTI in 2003

AMBER, the Astronomical Multi-Beam Recombiner, is an instrument mounted on the Very Large Telescope (VLT), combining the light of the three Unit Telescopes in the near-infrared of the VLT-Interferometer (VLTI). It is at the source of a considerable number of publications in the field of optical long-baseline interferometry.

It combines three out of the four telescopes of the VLTI, through a spectrograph, making it a unique instrument, combining spectroscopy and interferometry. These properties, and the fact that AMBER is an open-community instrument, made it a successful instrument. It can be compared to its fellow in the mid-infrared, the MIDI instrument in terms of the number of publications.

Highlights from the AMBER instrument include the first detection of a Keplerian-rotating disk around a Be star, the discovery of disks around evolved stars, the characterization of the disks of young stars, the observations of novae, the sharpest images of evolved stars and the characterization of the central dusty torus of active galactic nuclei. As of the end of 2017, 150 refereed papers had been published using AMBER data.

== See also ==
- Astronomical interferometer
- CHARA array
- GRAVITY – Very Large Telescope#Instruments
- Infrared Spatial Interferometer
- MATISSE – Multi Aperture Mid-Infrared Spectroscopic Experiment
- NPOI – Navy Precision Optical Interferometer
