= Nick Scoville =

Professor of Astronomy

- Born: Nicholas Zabriskie Scoville
- Education: Columbia University
- Known for: Cosmic Evolution Survey
- Awards: Guggenheim Fellowship (1981); Jansky Lecturership (2015); Bruce Medal (2017); Henry Norris Russell Lectureship (2021)
- Scientific career
- Fields: Molecular clouds
- Workplaces: California Institute of Technology
- Doctoral advisor: Philip M. Solomon
- Website: www.astro.caltech.edu/people/faculty/Nick_Scoville.html

Nicholas Zabriskie "Nick" Scoville is the Francis L. Moseley Professor of Astronomy at Caltech.

== Education ==
Scoville earned his B.A. and Ph.D. from Columbia University.

== Research ==
Scoville's research interests include interstellar molecular clouds and star formation activity within these clouds, interacting ultraluminous infrared galaxies (ULIRGs) and active galactic nuclei. He led the Cosmic Evolution Survey (COSMOS). The COSMOS field is among the best-studied fields in extragalactic astronomy and one of the largest galaxy surveys executed by the Hubble Space Telescope.

Scoville's major research investigations include: first mapping of CO emission in the Galactic Plane and discovery of the 5 kpc molecular gas ring (with Phil Solomon); first theoretical analysis of line photon trapping in the molecular emission lines (with Solomon); first recognition that molecular gas clouds were self-gravitating (rather than being galactic spiral arms); theory of mass-loss winds from red giant stars and their molecular emission lines (with Peter Godreich); the UMass-Stonybrook galactic CO survey (with Dave Sanders, Phil Solomon and Dan Clemens), the UMass extragalactic CO survey (with Judy Young and students); High Resolution IR spectroscopy (with Don Hall, Susan Kleinman and Steve Ridgway); observations and theoretical modelling of ULIRGs and the evolution of starburst galaxies to quasars (with Dave Sanders, Colin Norman and others); imaging of local ULIRGs and the Galactic Center with the Hubble Space Telescope NICMOS camera (with Roger Thompson, Aaron Evans and Susan Stolovy); founder and leader of the COSMOS collaboration; and the evolution of interstellar gas and dust in galaxies from z = 0.1 to 5 (with the COSMOS collaboration).

Scoville's main hobby outside astronomy is steel sculptural design and construction and welding. He also works on the Hubble Heritage Project, and the Cosmic Evolution Survey a multi-wavelength deep-field study of galaxies in the early universe.

While at the University of Massachusetts, Scoville was the associate director of Five College Radio Astronomy Observatory. At Caltech, he was the director of Owens Valley Radio Observatory from 1986 through 1996.

Scoville developed the MIR software package for calibrating data from the OVRO Millimeter Array, which was later used by other astronomical radio interferometers.

The main belt asteroid 25746 Nickscoville is named after Scoville. He was elected as a member of the National Academy in 2022.

In 2021, Scoville was awarded the Henry Norris Russell Lectureship by the American Astronomical Society "for contributions in understanding molecular gas and star formation and for his work in inspiring generations of early-career astronomers".
