= Hyperion proto-supercluster =

Galaxy cluster in the constellation Sextans

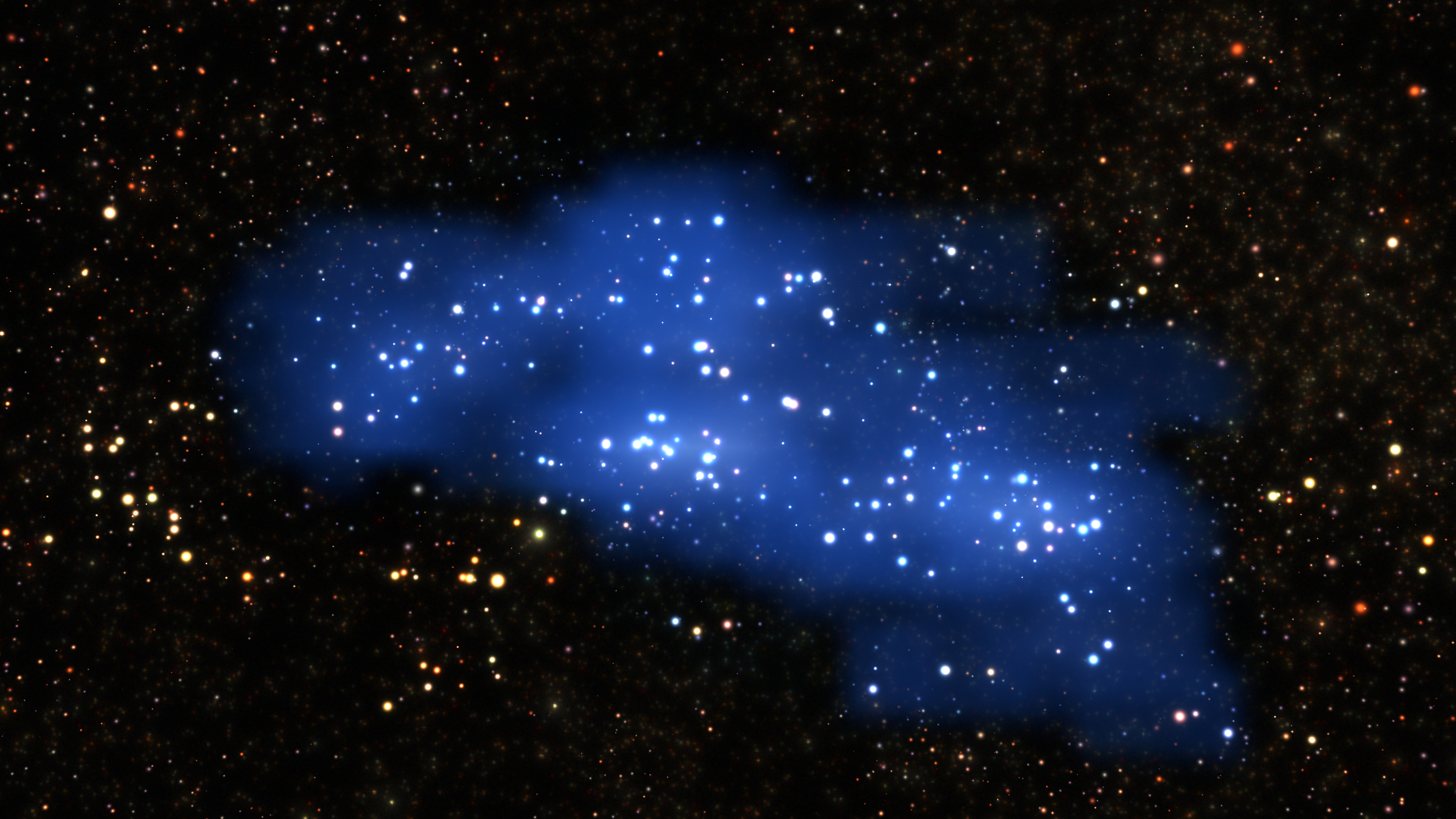
- Visualization of the Hyperion proto-supercluster

Observation data (Epoch J2000)
- Constellation: Sextans
- Right ascension: 10^{h} 6^{m}
- Declination: 2.3°
- Major axis: 150 Mpc (489 Mly)
- Minor axis: 60 Mpc (196 Mly)
- Redshift: 2.45
- Binding mass: 4.8×10^{15} M_{☉}

The Hyperion proto-supercluster is the largest and earliest known proto-supercluster, 5,000 times the mass of the Milky Way and seen at 20% of the current age of the universe. It was discovered in 2018 by analysing the redshifts of 10,000 objects observed with the Very Large Telescope in Chile.

== Discovery ==
The discovery was announced in late 2018.

The discovery team, led by Olga Cucciati, used computational astrophysics methods and astroinformatics; statistical techniques were applied to large datasets of galaxy redshifts, using a two-dimensional Voronoi tessellation to correlate gravitational interaction (virialization) of visible structures. The existence of non-visible (dark matter) structures was inferred.

Correlation was based on redshift data captured in a sky survey called VIMOS-VLT Deep Survey, using the Visible Multi Object Spectrograph (VIMOS) instrument of the Very Large Telescope in Chile, and other surveys to a lesser extent. Spectroscopic redshift data for 3,822 objects (galaxies) was selected.

The discovery was published in Astronomy & Astrophysics in September 2018.

== Physical description ==
The structure is estimated to weigh 4.8 × 10^{15} solar masses (about 5,000 times the mass of the Milky Way) and to extend 60 Mpc × 60 Mpc × 150 Mpc (196 Mly × 196 Mly × 489 Mly). It lies within the two square degree Cosmic Evolution Survey (COSMOS) field of the constellation Sextans. Hyperion's redshift is z=2.45 putting it 11 billion light years from Earth; it existed at less than 20% of the present age of the Universe. Eventually it is "expected to evolve into something similar to the immense structures in the local universe such as the superclusters making up the Sloan Great Wall or the Virgo Supercluster".

== Use in cosmology ==
The supercluster contains dark matter, evidenced by a mismatch between the visible objects in it and their computed gravitational binding. As a relic from the early Universe, the dark matter data could be used to test cosmological theories. As the 2018 paper authors note, "the identification of massive/complex proto-clusters at high redshift could be useful to give constraints on dark matter simulations" of the Lambda-CDM model.

== See also ==
- Lynx Supercluster, former record-holder supercluster for red shift z=1.26–1.27 (distance or time of formation)
- CL J1001+0220, record-holder galaxy cluster since 2016 at z=2.5

== Sources ==
- Cucciati, O.; Lemaux, B. C.; Zamorani, G.; Le Fèvre, O.; Tasca, L. A. M.; Hathi, N. P.; Lee, K.-G.; Bardelli, S.; Cassata, P.; Garilli, B.; Le Brun, V.; MacCagni, D.; Pentericci, L.; Thomas, R.; Vanzella, E.; Zucca, E.; Lubin, L. M.; Amorin, R.; Cassarà, L. P.; Cimatti, A.; Talia, M.; Vergani, D.; Koekemoer, A.; Pforr, J.; Salvato, M. (2018). "The progeny of a cosmic titan: A massive multi-component proto-supercluster in formation at z = 2.45 in VUDS". Astronomy & Astrophysics. 619: A49. arXiv:1806.06073. Bibcode:2018A&A...619A..49C. doi:10.1051/0004-6361/201833655. S2CID 119472428.
