= Visible Multi Object Spectrograph =

Wide field imager and multi-object spectrograph at the VLT in Chile

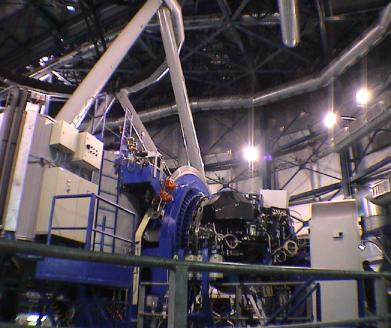
VIMOS attached to VLT's Melipal (UT3)

The Visible Multi-Object Spectrograph (VIMOS) is a wide field imager and a multi-object spectrograph installed at the European Southern Observatory's Very Large Telescope (VLT), in Chile. The instrument used for deep astronomical surveys delivers visible images and spectra of up to 1,000 galaxies at a time. VIMOS images four rectangular areas of the sky, 7 by 8 arcminutes each, with gaps of 2 arcminutes between them. Its principal investigator was Olivier Le Fèvre.

The Franco-Italian instrument operates in the visible part of the spectrum from 360 to 1000 nanometers (nm). In the conceptual design phase, the multi-object spectrograph then called VIRMOS included an additional instrument, NIMOS, operating in the near-infrared spectrum of 1100–1800 nm.

Operating in the three different observation modes, direct imaging, multi-slit spectroscopy, and integral field spectroscopy, the main objective of the instrument is to study the early universe through massive redshift surveys, such as the VIMOS-VLT Deep Survey.

VIMOS saw its first light on 26 February 2002, and has since been mounted on the Nasmyth B focus of VLT's Melipal unit telescope (UT3).

It was retired in 2018 to make space for the return of CRIRES+.

== Gallery ==
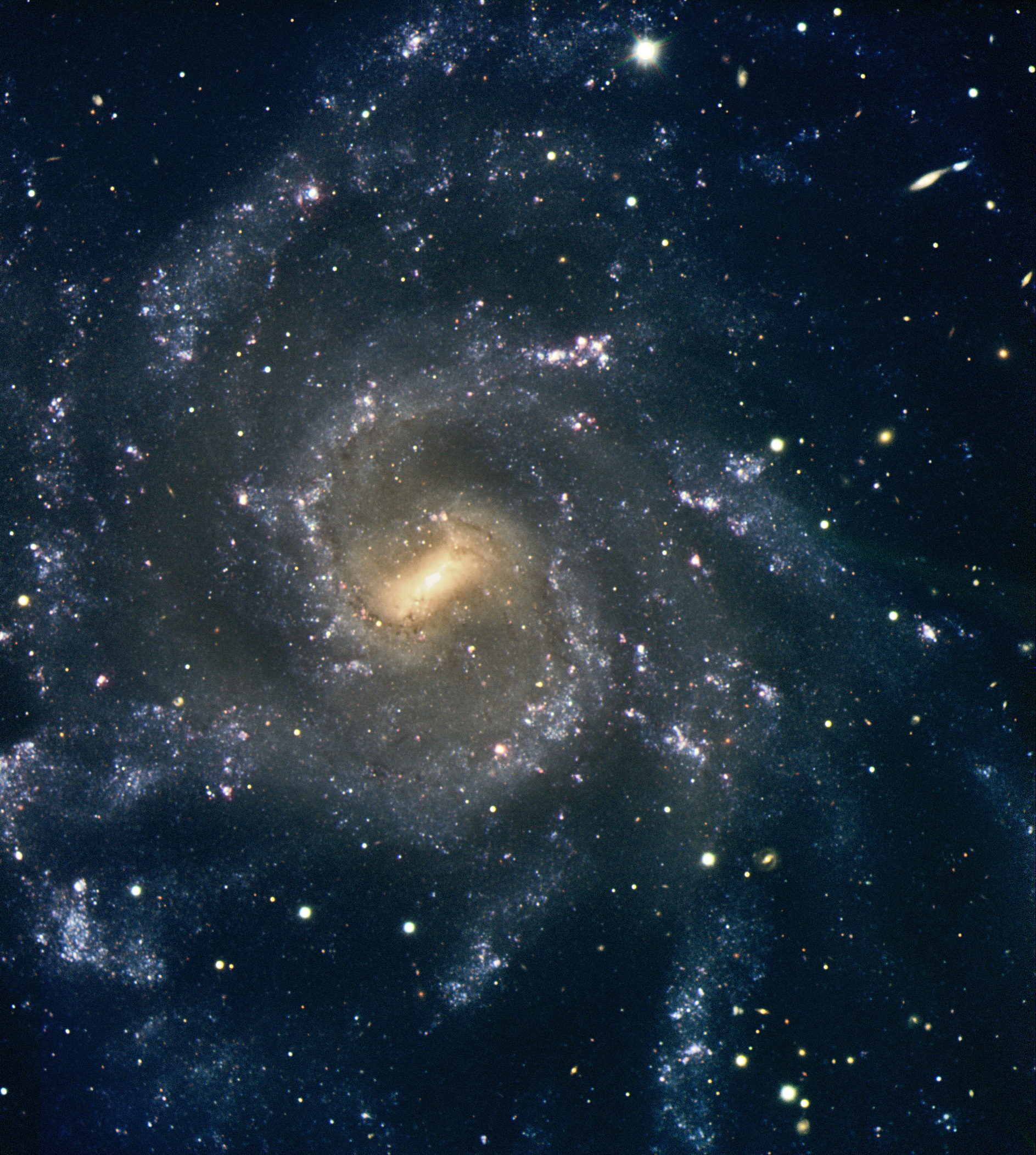
Galaxy NGC 7424 seen by VIMOS

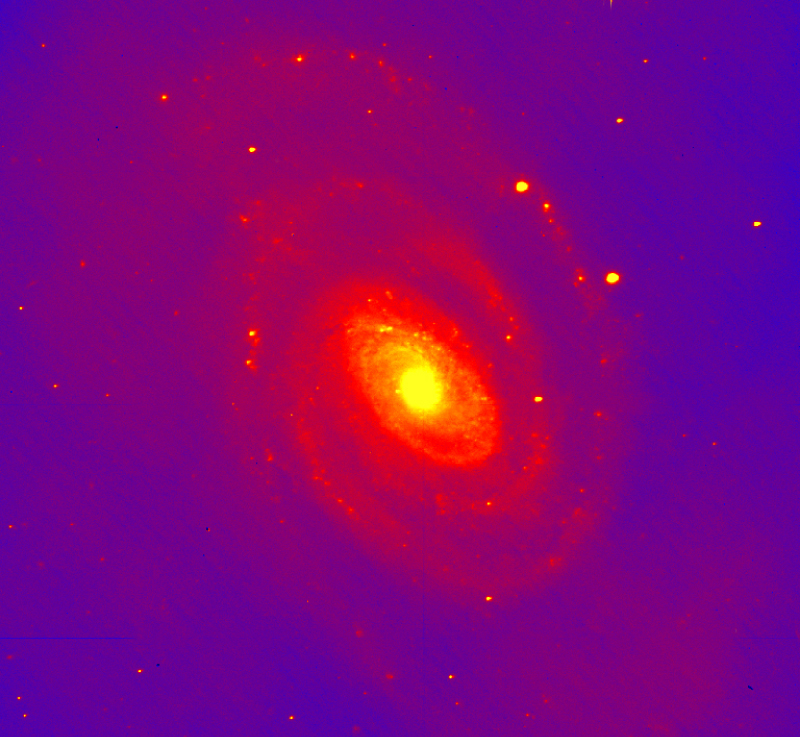
VIMOS takes its first light image of galaxy NGC 5364

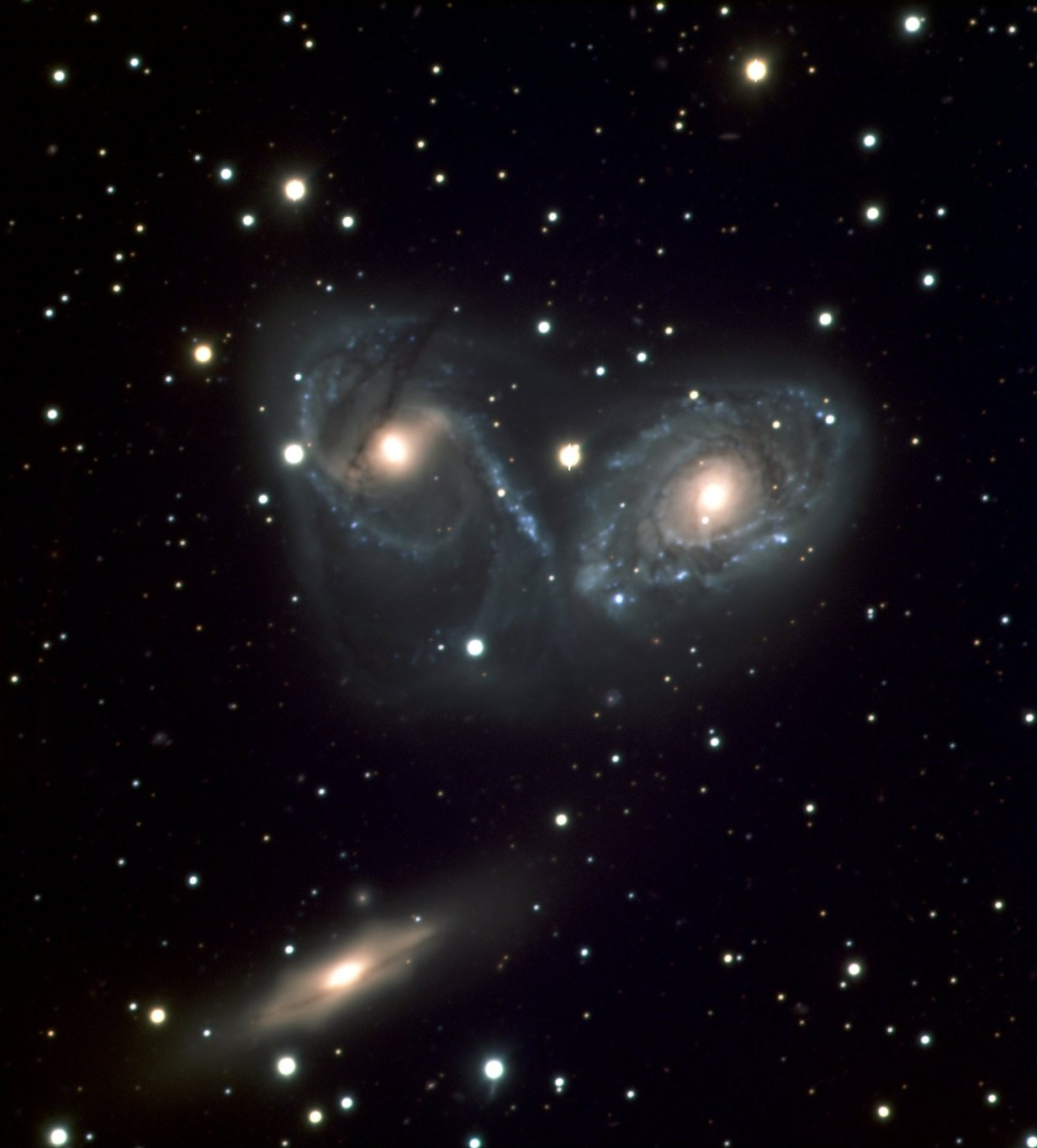
A triplet of galaxies seen by VIMOS

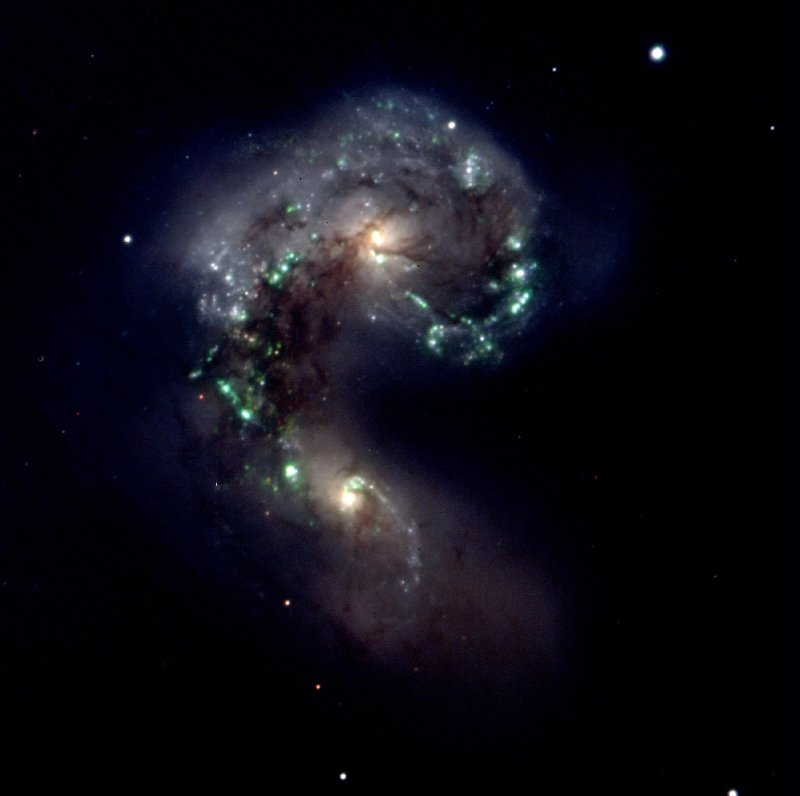
The Antennae Galaxies, one of VIMOS' first images

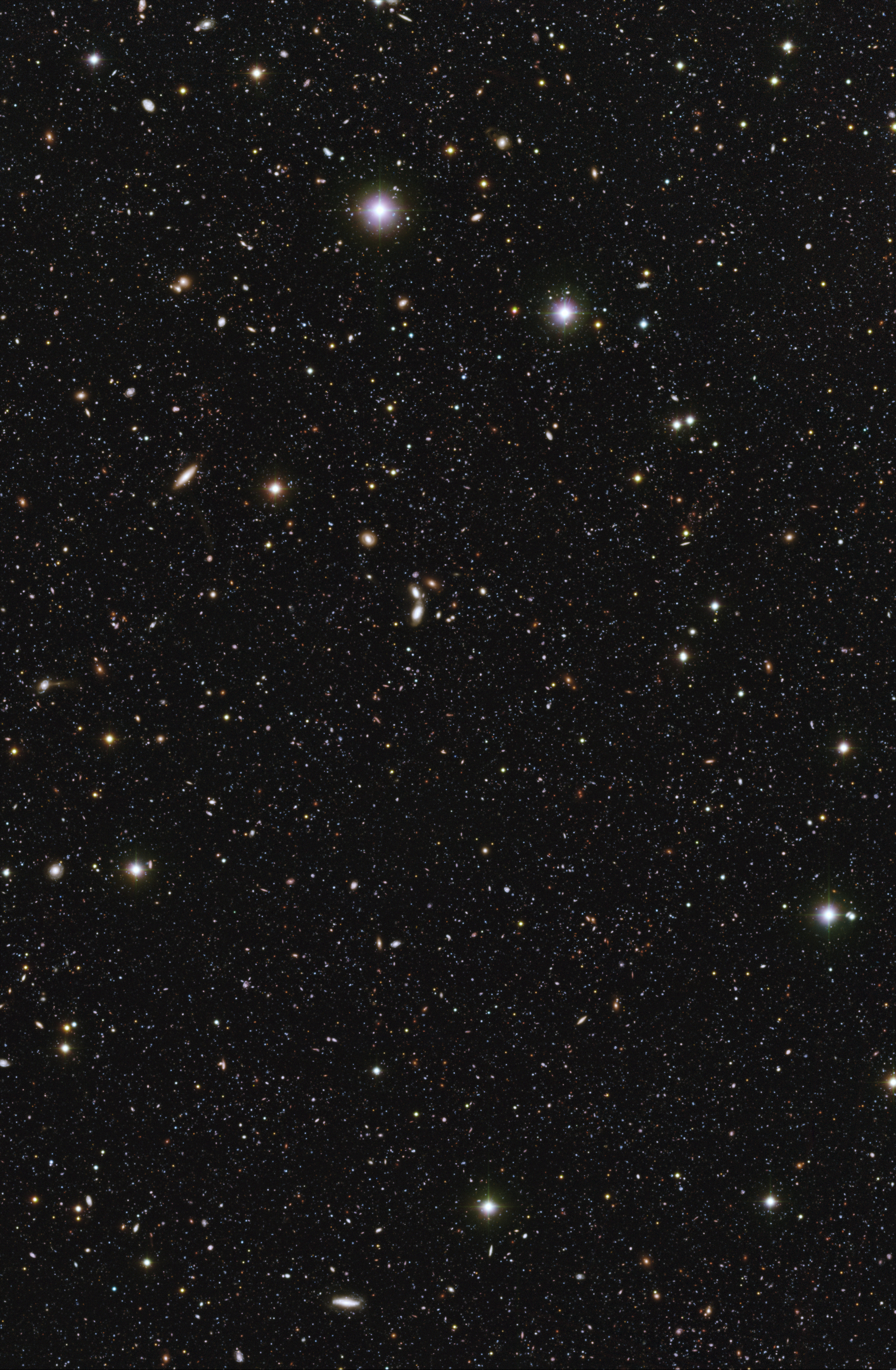
The Chandra Deep Field South

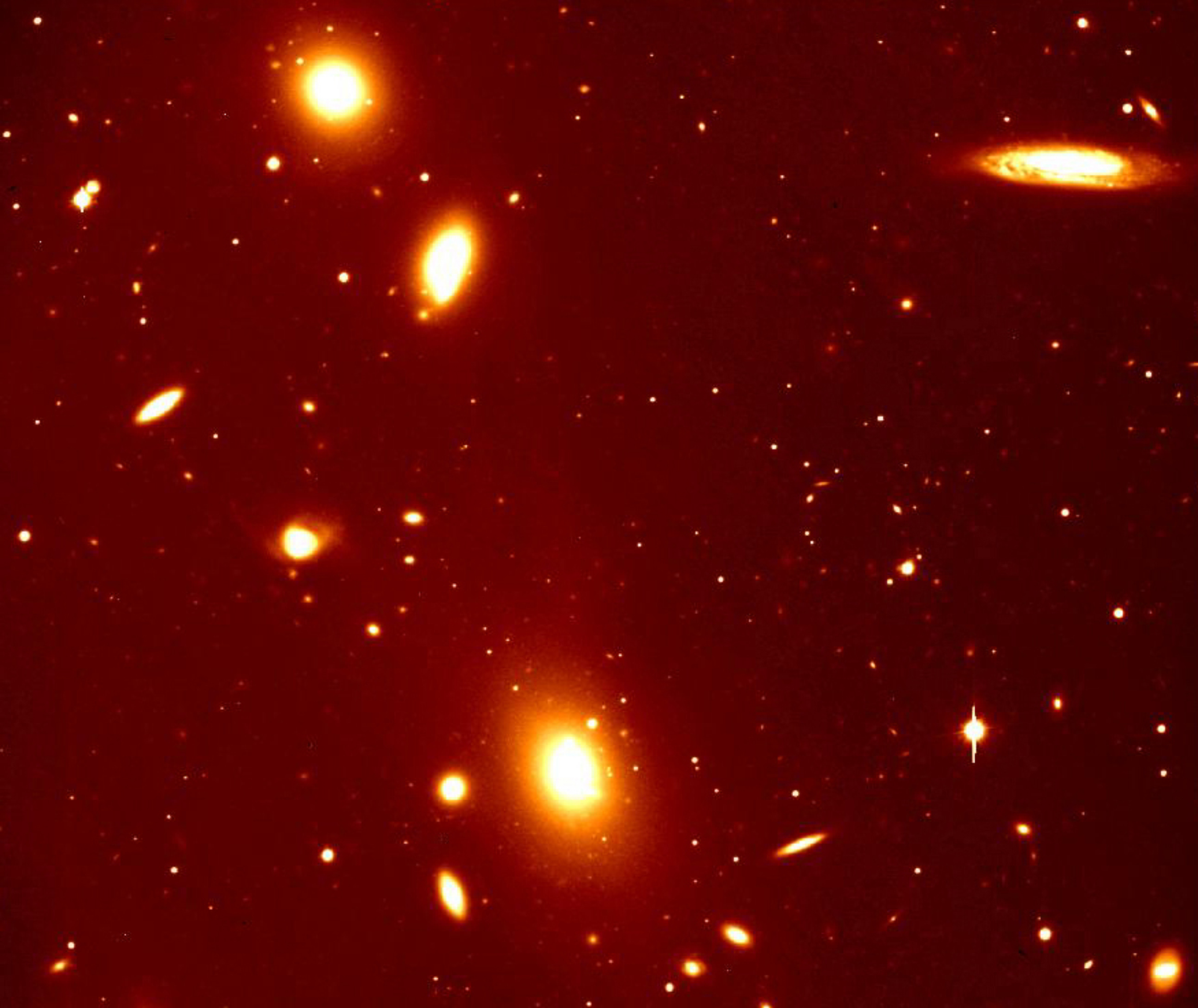
VIMOS images the 500 million light years distant galaxy cluster ACO 3341

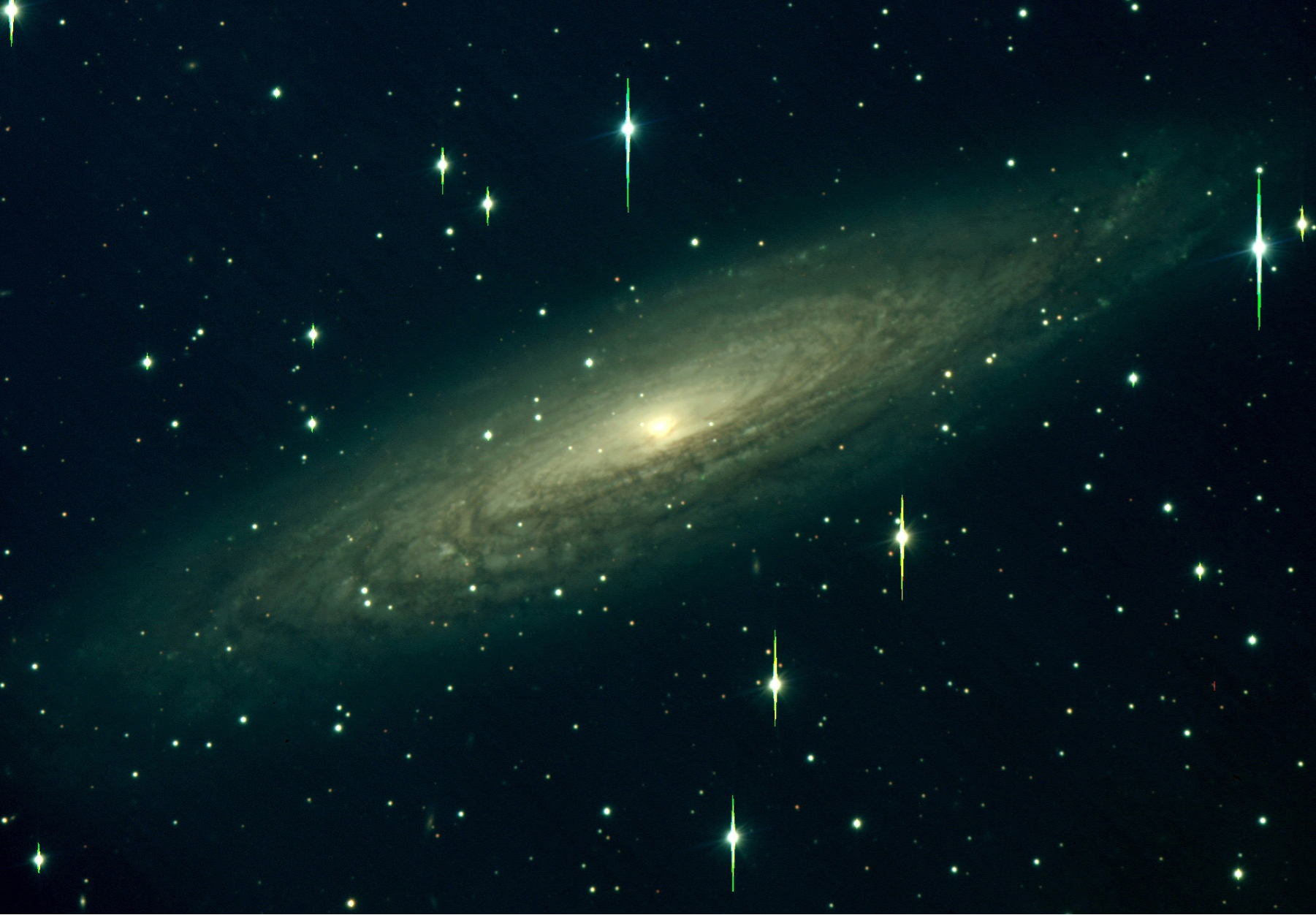
Galaxy NGC 2613, a spiral galaxy that resembles our own Milky Way

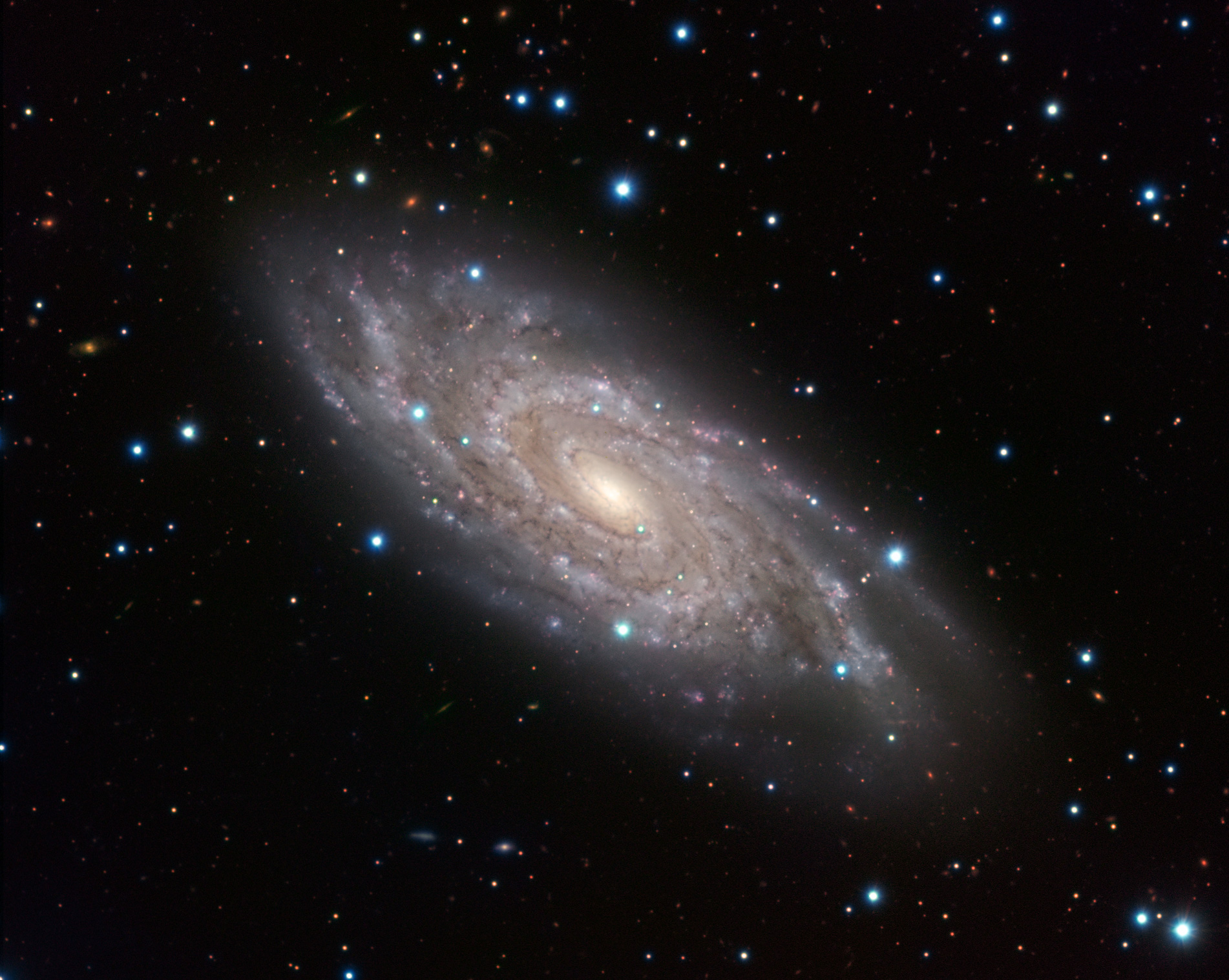
VIMOS sees cluster NGC 6118 at a distance of 80 million light-years

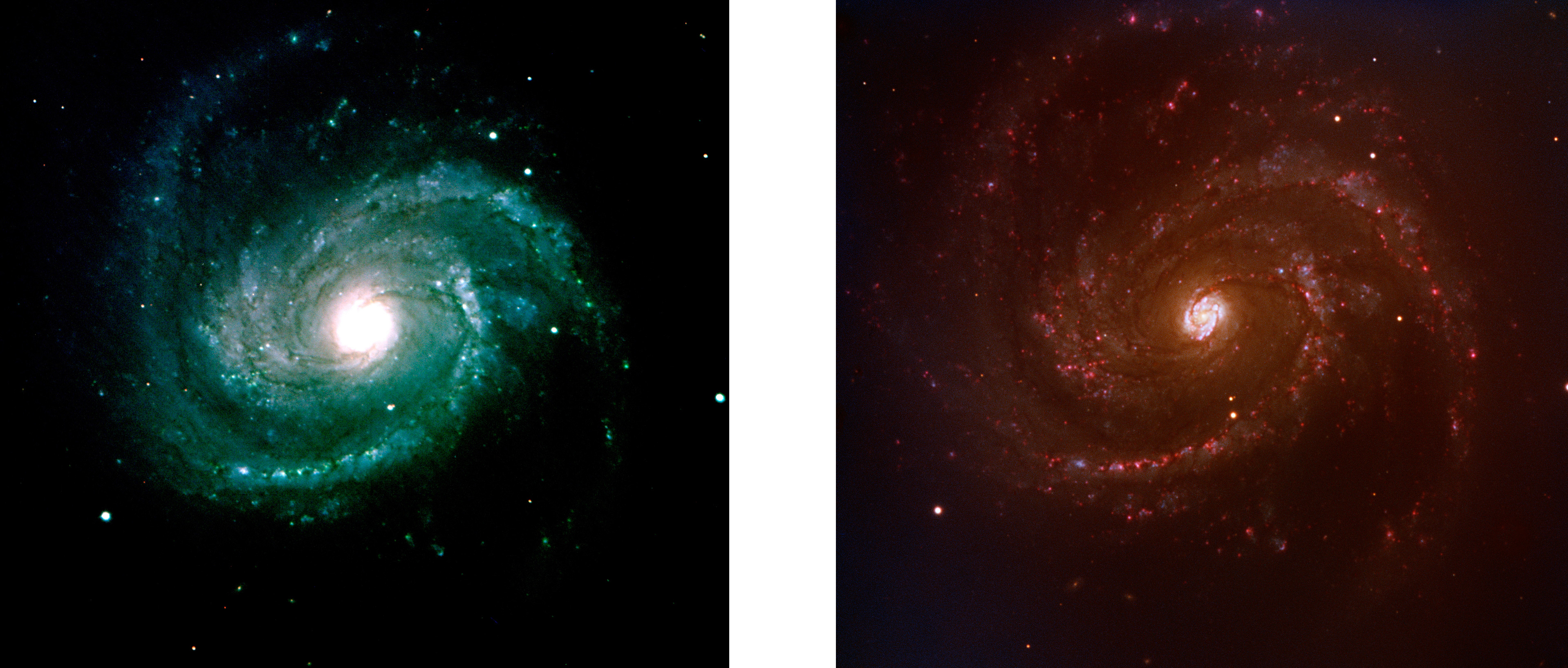
Messier 100 seen in different filters by VIMOS (left) and FORS 1. (Note supernova SN 2006X in the middle of the right image, just above the lower main spiral arm).

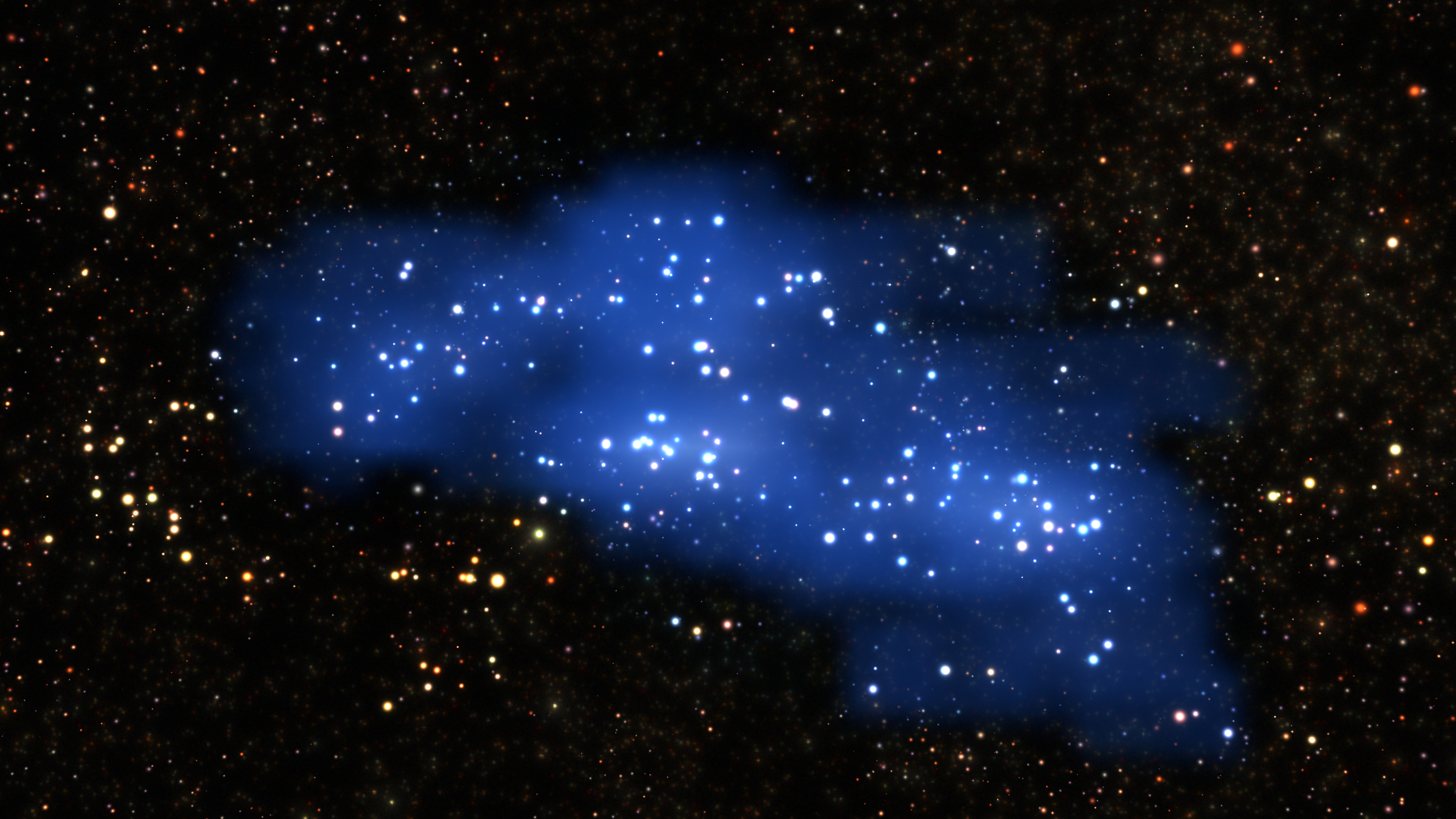
Visualization of the Hyperion proto-supercluster found within COSMOS seen by VIMOS.
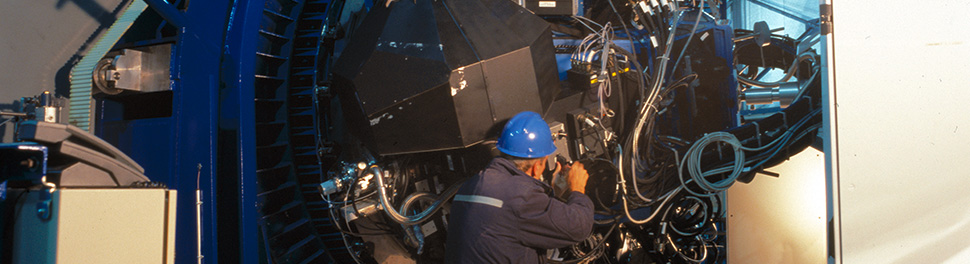
Close-up of VIMOS

== See also ==
- List of instruments at the Very Large Telescope
