= Olivier Le Fèvre =

French astrophysicist (1960–2020)

Olivier Le Fèvre (1960 – 2020) was a French astrophysicist who studied galaxies using multi-object spectroscopy.

== Personal life ==
He was born in Saint-Cloud, Hauts-de-Seine, on 21 November 1960. He started as an amateur astronomer before becoming a professional one. He had two daughters. He moved to Marseilles in 1997, and enjoyed cycling and surfing. He was diagnosed with a brain tumor, and after 2.5 years he died of it on 25 June 2020.

== Career ==
He studied for a PhD at Paul Sabatier University, graduating in 1986. He then worked as a resident astronomer at the Canada–France–Hawaii Telescope, before moving to Paris Observatory in 1994, until moving to the Laboratory of Astrophysics at the Aix-Marseille University in 1997, subsequently serving as its director between 2004 and 2011. He received a European Research Council grant in 2011. His publications were amongst the most cited for a French astronomer. He was a member of the European Southern Observatory Council, and he was a member of International Astronomical Union.

== Research ==
He used multi-object spectroscopy to study galaxy evolution and formation, and the large-scale structure of the Universe. He started the Canada-France Redshift Survey with the MOS-SIS multi-object spectrograph on the Canada–France–Hawaii Telescope. He was the principal investigator of the Visible Multi Object Spectrograph on the Very Large Telescope, and spent over 15 years using it to observe galaxies. He was involved in the selection of the Euclid telescope, as well as working on instruments for the James Webb Space Telescope and the Subaru Telescope.
