= NGC 6118 =

Galaxy in the constellation Serpens

- NGC 6118 in almost-true colour: image-composite from images made with the VLT using its VIMOS imager.

Observation data (J2000 epoch)
- Constellation: Serpens
- Right ascension: 16^{h} 21^{m} 48.6^{s}
- Declination: −02° 17′ 00″
- Redshift: 0.005247 (1573 ± 1 km/s)
- Distance: 82.9 Mly (25.4 Mpc)
- Apparent magnitude (V): 12.42

Characteristics
- Type: SA(s)cd
- Size: 110,000 ly (diameter)
- Apparent size (V): 4.7 x 2.0 arcmin

Other designations
- UGC 10350, MCG +00-42-002, PGC 57924, CGCG 024-008

NGC 6118 is a grand design spiral galaxy located 83 million light-years away in the constellation Serpens (the Snake). It was discovered by German-British astronomer William Herschel on 14 April 1785.

NGC 6118 measures roughly 110,000 light-years across; about the same as our own galaxy, the Milky Way. Its shape is classified as SA(s)cd, meaning that it is unbarred and has several rather loosely wound spiral arms. The large numbers of bright bluish knots are active star-forming regions where some very luminous and young stars can be perceived.

Because NGC 6118 has loosely wound spiral open arms, no clear defined spiral arms like the Milky Way galaxy and lacks a central bar, the galaxy thus does not have a galactic habitable zone like the Milky Way. For the Milky Way, the galactic habitable zone is commonly believed to be an annulus with an outer radius of about 10 kiloparsecs and an inner radius close to the Galactic Center, both of which lack hard boundaries.

NGC 6118 is difficult to see with a small telescope. Amateur astronomers have nicknamed it the "Blinking Galaxy", as it has a tendency to flick in and out of view with different eye positions.

== Supernovae ==
Two supernovae have been observed in NGC 6118:

- SN 2004dk was first reported by James Graham and Weidong Li on 1 August 2004. They found it by studying images produced by the Lick Observatory Supernova Search (LOSS) program with the 76 cm Katzman Automatic Imaging Telescope (KAIT) in San Jose, CA. SN 2004dk was initially classified by European Southern Observatory astronomer Fernando Patat et al. on 4 Aug 2004 as a Type Ic supernova. Type Ib and Ic supernovae are the end result of massive stars (> 8 solar masses) that have run out of nuclear fuel. Normally one would expect to see evidence of hydrogen and helium, but when these supernova occur in a binary system the companion has sometimes gravitationally stripped the outer layers of the progenitor star away, leaving only the heavier elements. Type Ib supernovae have no hydrogen, while Type Ic have neither hydrogen or helium. Over the following weeks, Alexei Filippenko et al. and the University of California at Berkeley discovered prominent He I absorption lines, thus changing the classification of the supernova to Type Ib.
- SN 2020hvp (Type Ib, mag. 18.2) was discovered by ATLAS on 21 April 2020.

== See also ==
- List of NGC objects (6001–7000)
