= COSMOS field =

Deep image of the Universe

Section of the COSMOS field, taken in infrared light, with a total effective exposure time of 55 hours.

The COSMOS field, or the Cosmic Evolution Survey Deep Field, is a stitched photograph of deep space, which was photographed with the Hubble Space Telescope's Advanced Camera for Surveys in segments from 2003 to 2005, and was supported by several other ground-based and space-based telescopes. It was the capstone of the COSMOS project, which aimed to observe and study how galaxies are affected by celestial environments.

== Description ==
The project and COSMOS field was a study of the way in which galaxies are influenced by physical properties and the environment that surrounds them. The COSMOS field was chosen to be the focal point of research due to its abundance of galaxies and other celestial bodies, and its scarcity of gas. The research from the project has been used to identify deep-space galaxies and their astrophysics.

The Cosmic Evolution Survey (COSMOS) was a wide field observational astronomy project. It was aimed at observing the correlation between galaxies, star formations, active galactic nuclei and dark matter and how they evolve, with large-scale structures of the universe. The survey included imaging in multiple wavelengths and spectroscopic analysis from X-rays to radio waves, in a region of two square degrees in the Constellation Sextans.

COSMOS, when it was proposed in 2003 as an exploratory survey to be carried out with the Advanced Camera for Surveys of the Hubble, was the largest HST project ever approved. Combined with the fact that the area of sky proposed as a survey had never been the subject of observations, the project has stimulated the main world astronomical structures to explore the sky in this direction, thus resulting in one of the most substantial, deepest and most uniform data sets in the entire electromagnetic spectrum.

Over two million galaxies have been identified in the COSMOS field. NASA and the ESO studied the COSMOS region, the region in which the mosaic was taken, and further research is ongoing. The mosaic itself covers a 2 square degree equatorial field. The age of the galaxies differ, spanning 75% of the age of the observable universe. HubbleSite states that "the COSMOS field is Hubble's largest contiguous survey of the universe, that covers two square degrees of sky. By comparison, the Earth's Moon is one-half degree across. The field is being imaged by most major space-based and ground-based telescopes". To compare, the well-known Hubble Ultra-Deep Field is the farthest visible view into the universe." The COSMOS field is the largest-ever contiguous survey of the Universe taken by the Hubble, and was the largest Hubble project ever approved before the CANDELS project was carried out from 2010 to 2013.

== Gallery ==
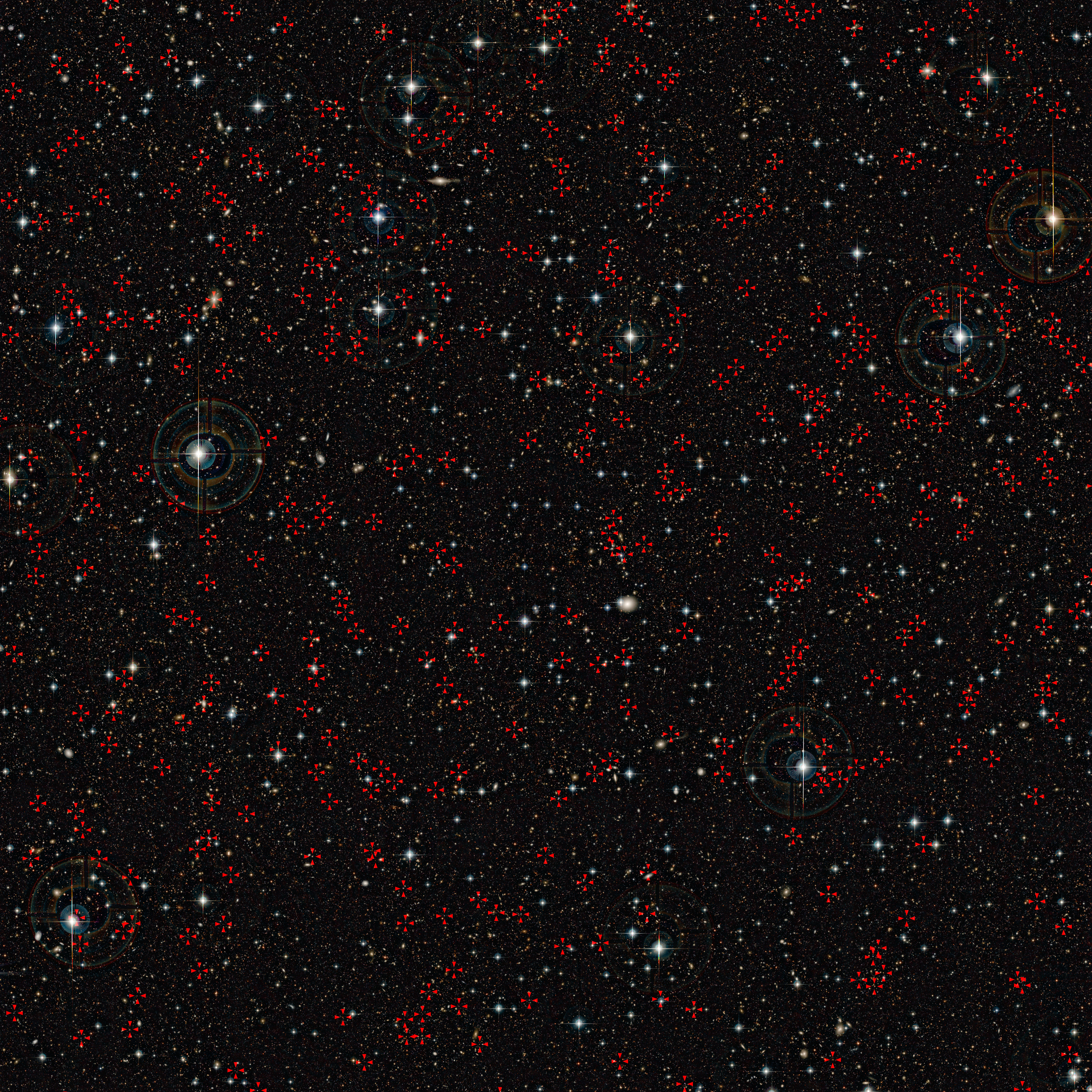
COSMOS field imaged by the Canada France Hawaii Telescope (CFHT). Red crosses mark some of the active galaxies with supermassive black holes at their centers.

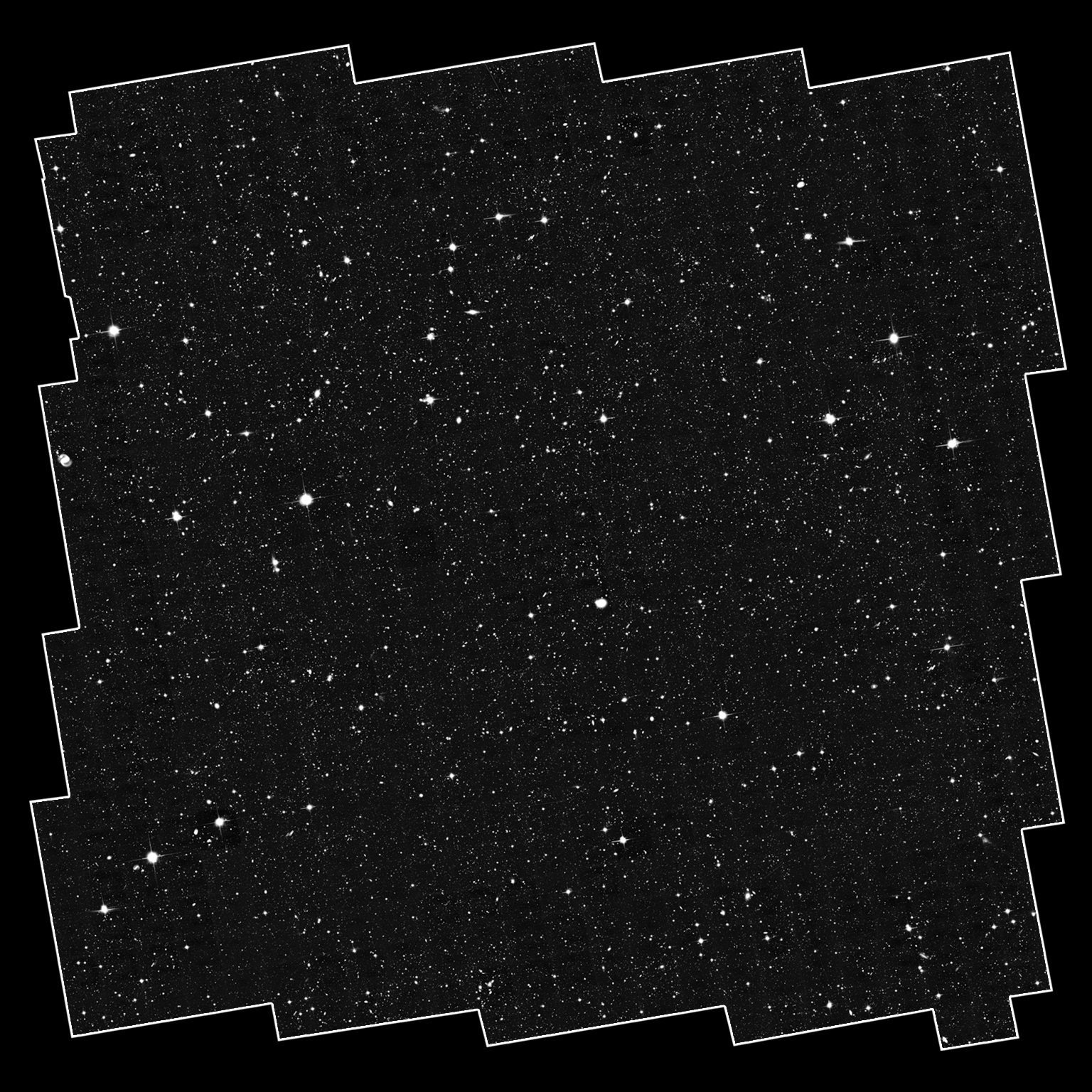
The full mosaic composed of 575 separate ACS images

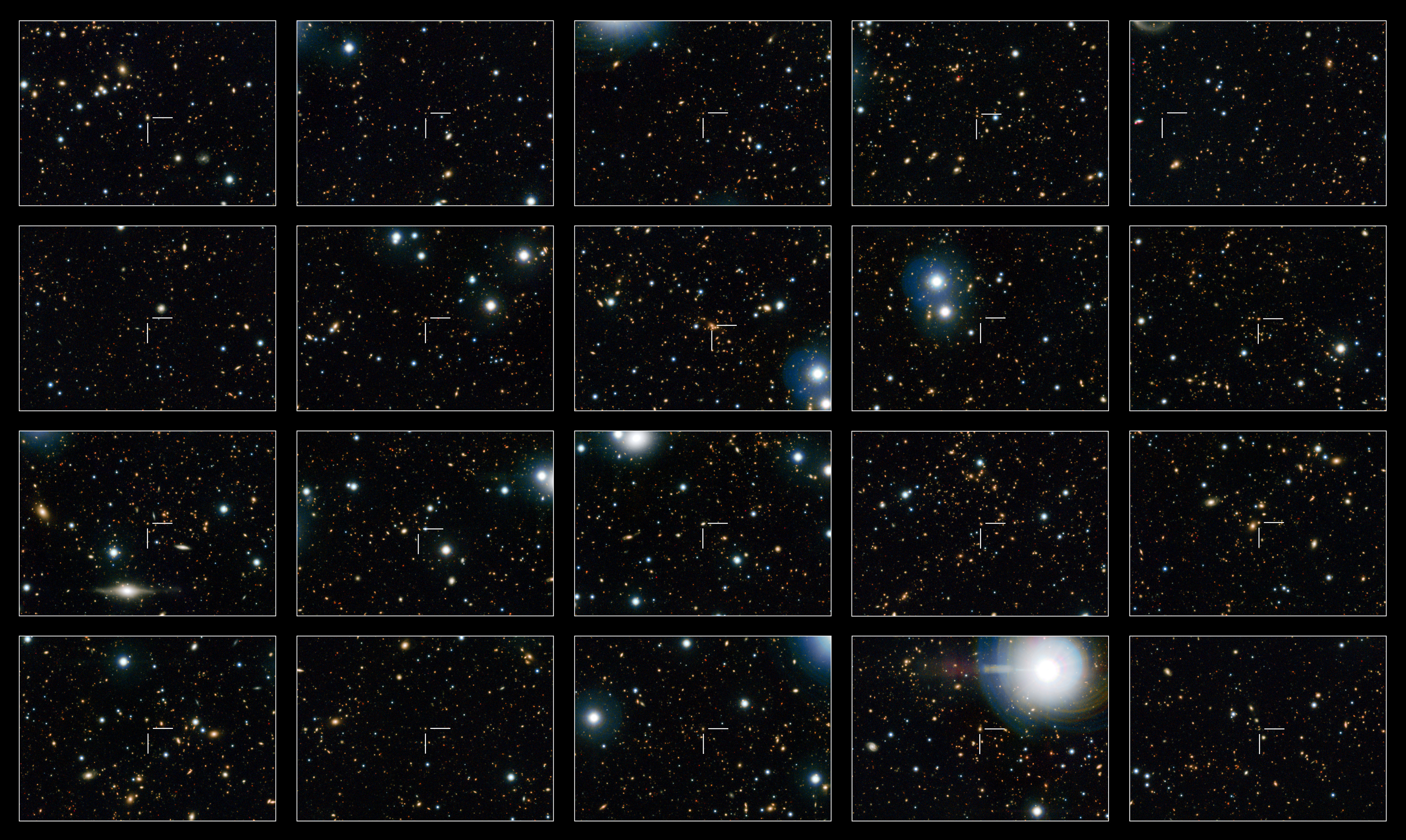
Sample of non-star-forming galaxies from the COSMOS survey

== See also ==
- Cosmic Evolution Survey
- Hubble Deep Field, another large sky survey image taken by the Hubble
- Hubble Ultra-Deep Field, another deep-space sky survey image taken by the Hubble
- List of deep fields
