= VIMOS-VLT Deep Survey =

Redshift survey carried out using the VIMOS spectrograph

- Website: cesam.lam.fr/vvdsproject/

The VIMOS-VLT Deep Survey (VVDS) is a redshift survey carried out by a collaboration between French and Italian astronomical institutes using the VIMOS spectrograph, mounted on the telescope Melipal (UT3) of the Very Large Telescope, located at the Paranal Observatory in Chile.
