= Cosmic Evolution Survey =

Hubble Space Telescope Treasury Project

- Members: more than 200 (as of 2019)
- Website: http://cosmos.astro.caltech.edu

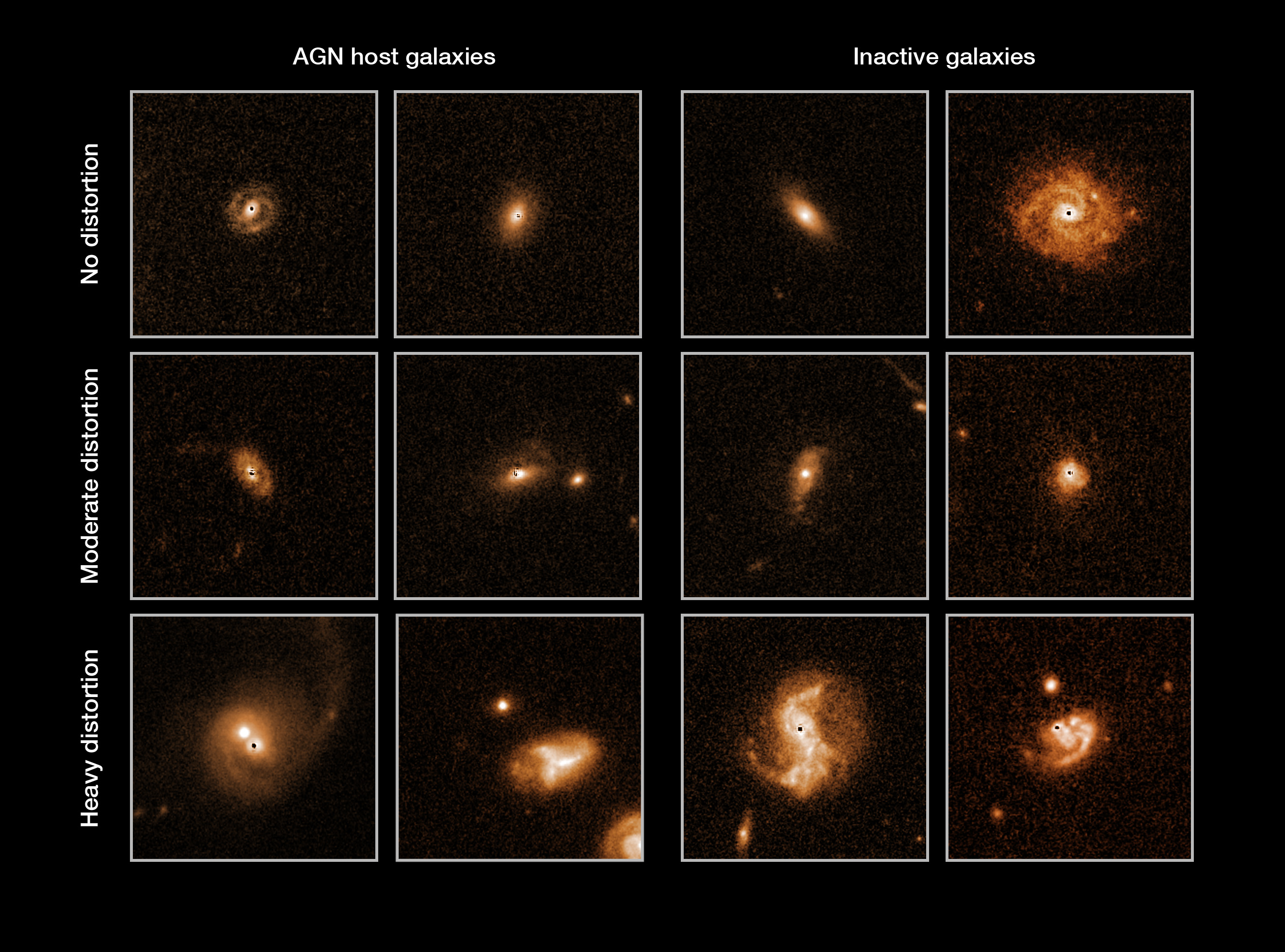
COSMOS survey to test the hypothesis that galactic mergers trigger active galactic nuclei.

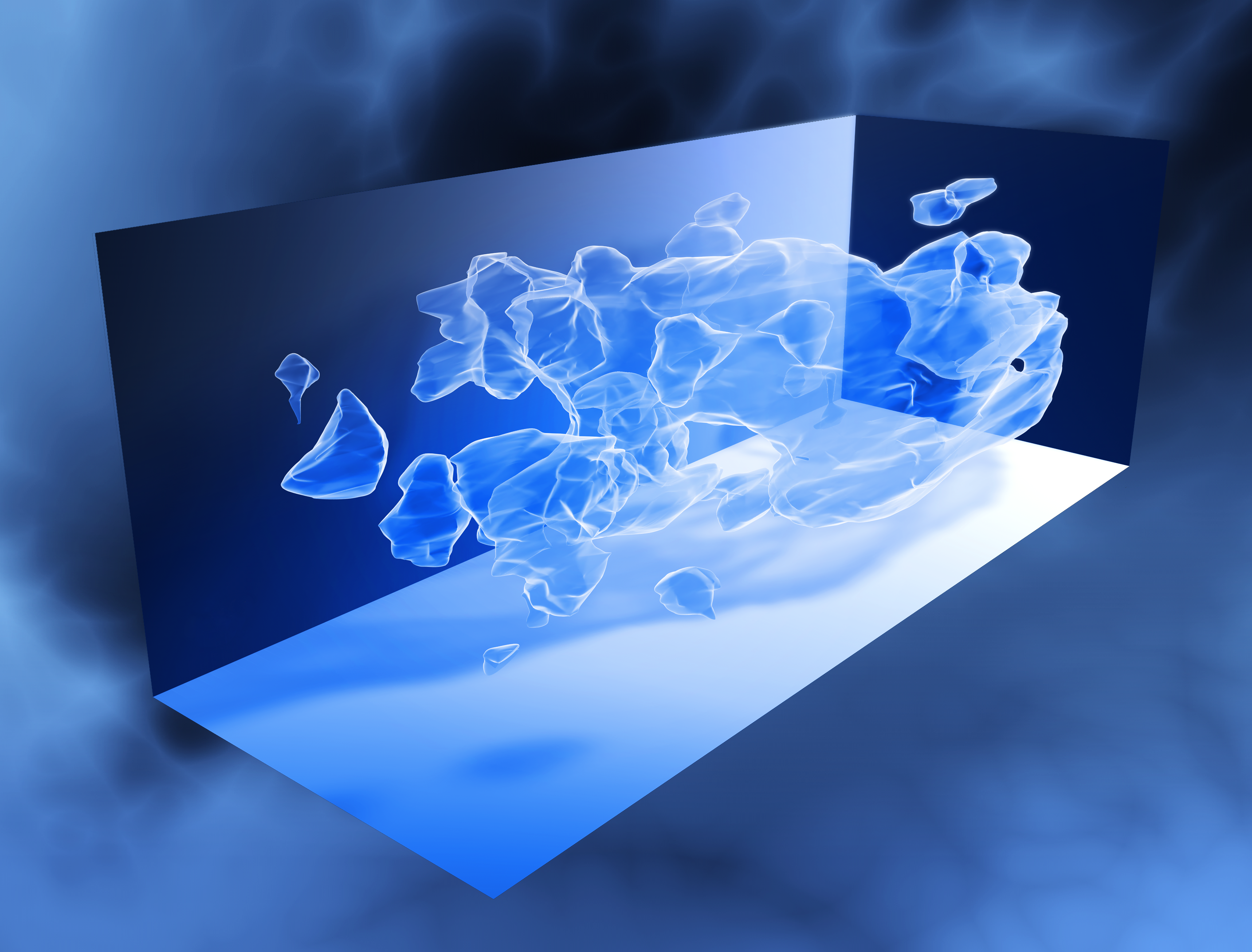
COSMOS's 3-D map of the large-scale distribution of dark matter, reconstructed from measurements of weak gravitational lensing with the Hubble Space Telescope.

The Cosmic Evolution Survey (COSMOS) is a Hubble Space Telescope (HST) Treasury Project to survey a two square degree equatorial field with the Advanced Camera for Surveys (ACS). The largest survey ever undertaken by HST, the project incorporates commitments from observatories around the world, such as the Very Large Array radio observatory, the European Space Agency's XMM-Newton satellite, Japan's eight meter Subaru telescope and James Webb Space Telescope. At the moment, more than 150 astronomers around the world actively contribute to the project.

The project's primary goal is to study the relationship between large scale structure (LSS) in the universe and dark matter, the formation of galaxies, and nuclear activity in galaxies. This includes careful analysis of the dependence of galaxy evolution on environment.

The survey covers a field, often known as the COSMOS field, of 2 square degrees of sky in the constellation Sextans. The centre of the field in j2000 coordinates is at Right Ascension 10:00:24 Declination 02:10:55

In 2007 they released the first 3D dark matter map.

== See also ==
- Dark Energy Survey

== Gallery ==
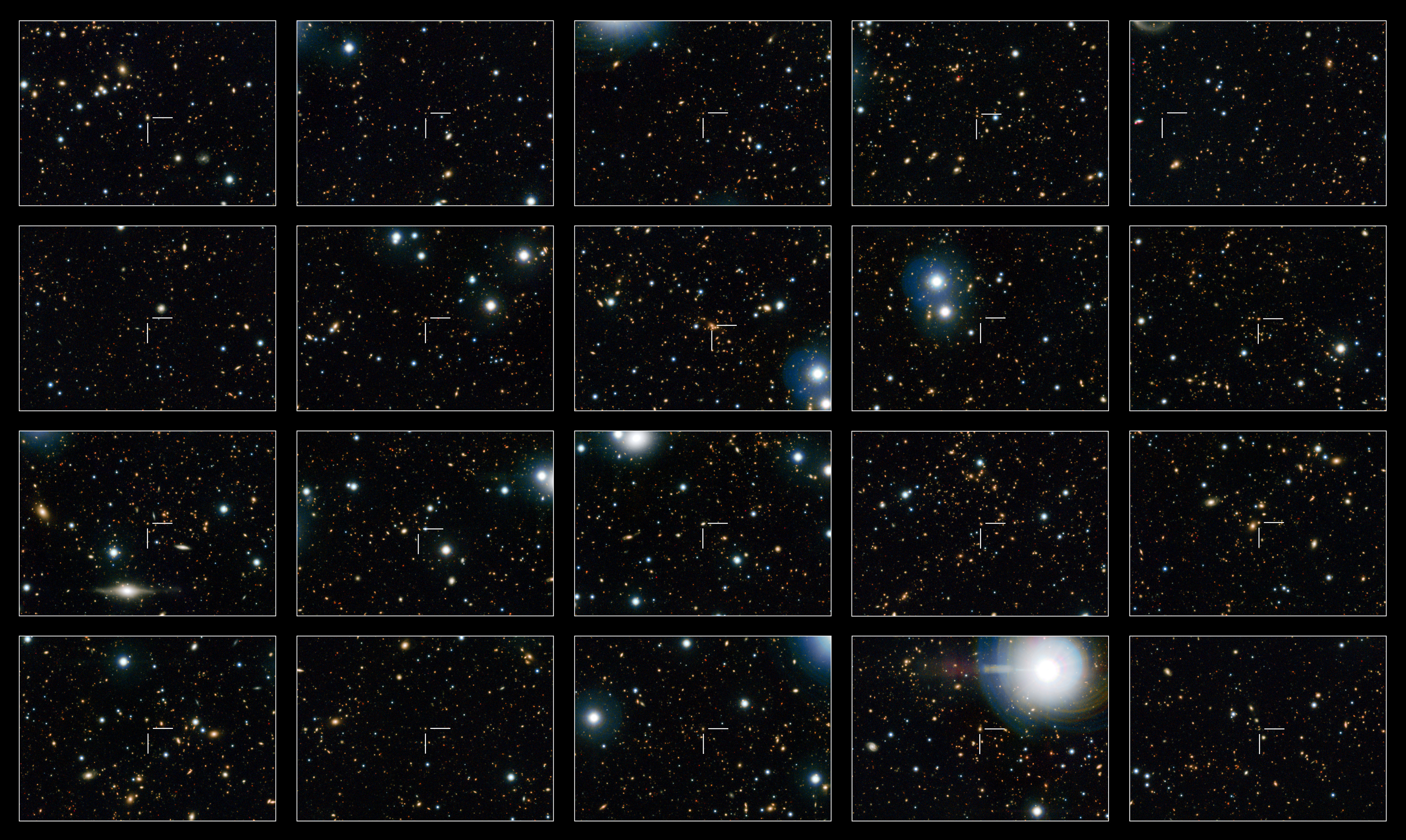
Sample of non-star-forming galaxies from the COSMOS survey.

COSMOS field in the constellation of Sextans.

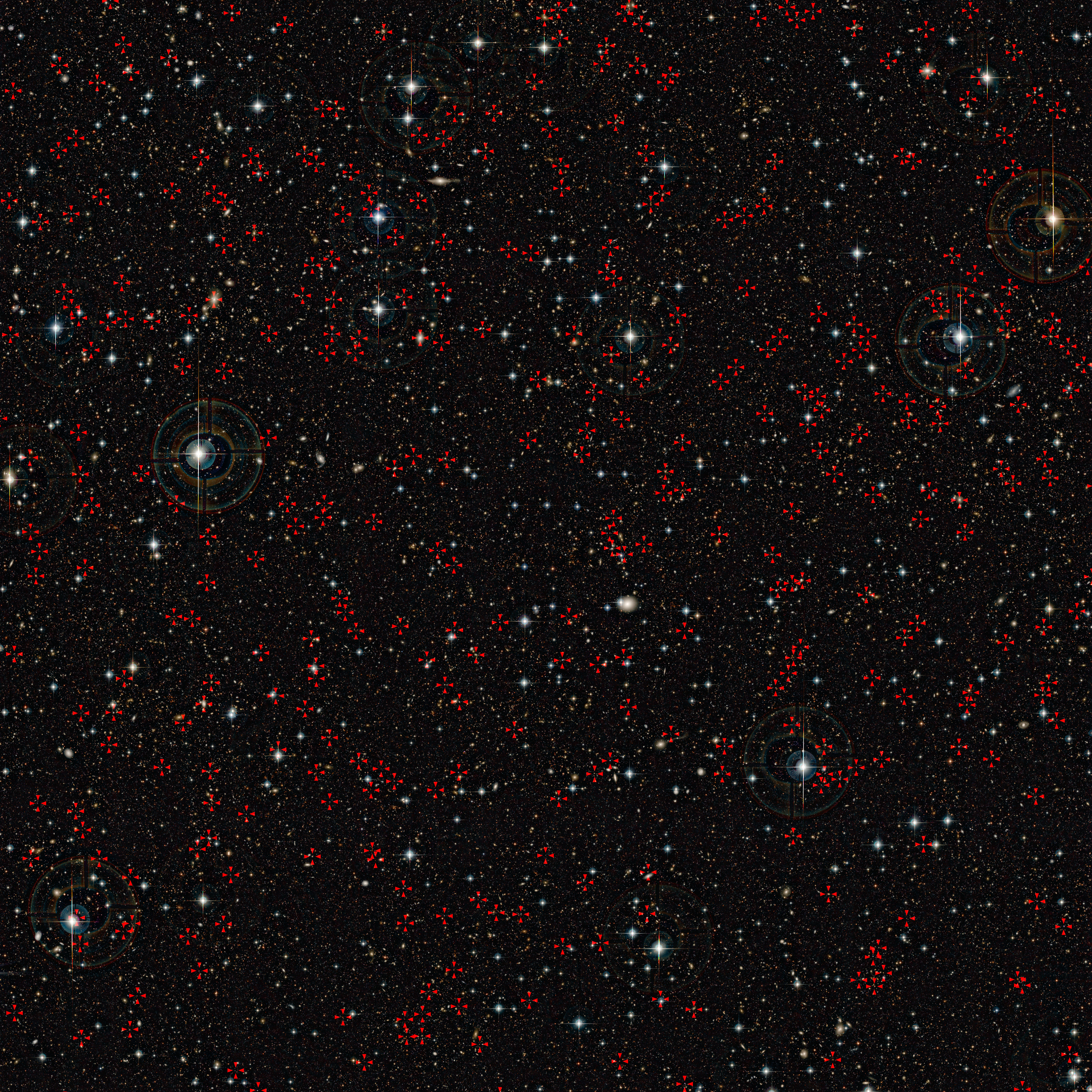
COSMOS survey combines data from ESO’s Very Large Telescope and ESA’s XMM-Newton X-ray space observatory.

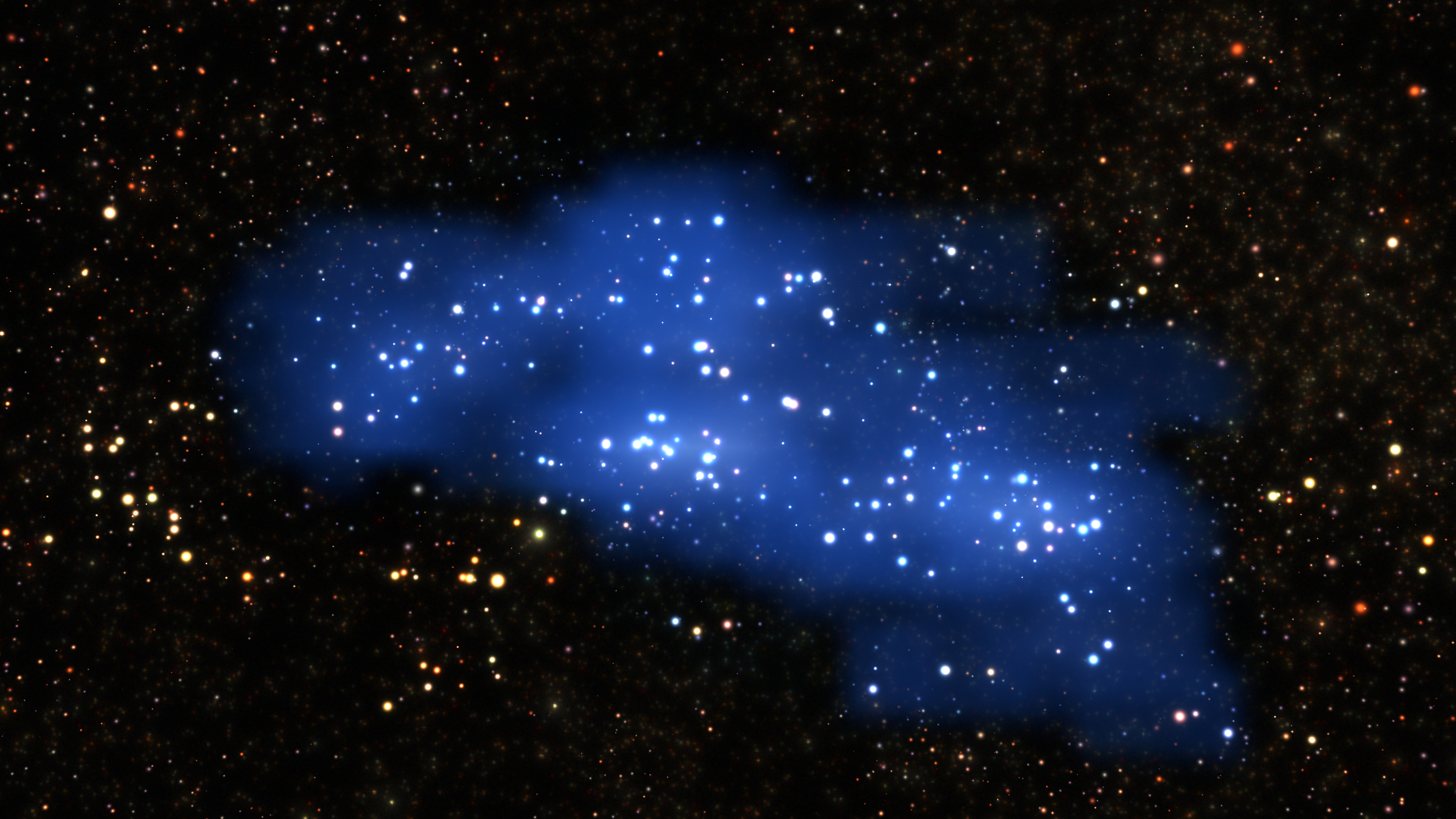
Visualization of the Hyperion proto-supercluster found within COSMOS.

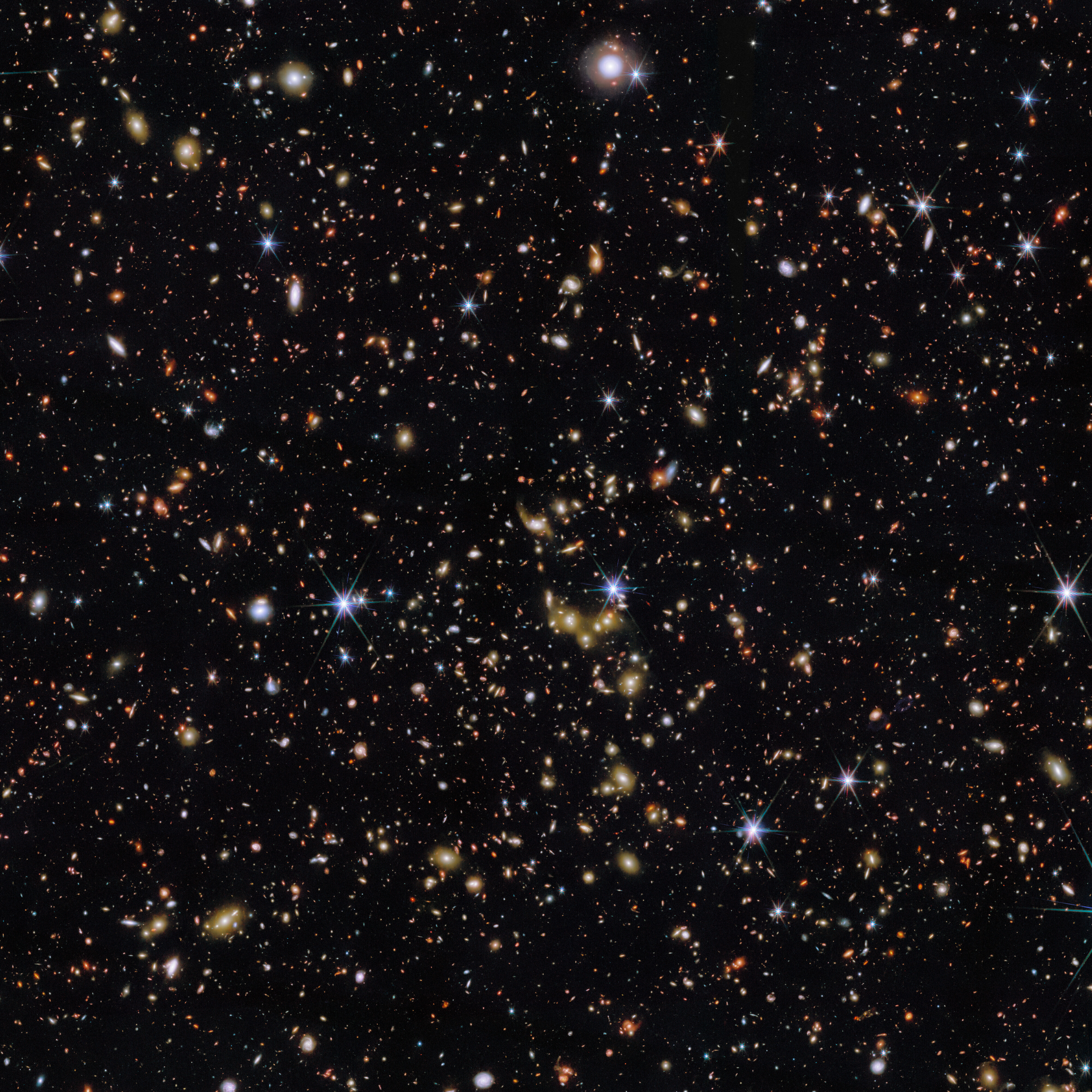
COSMOS-Web field measuring 6.44 by 6.44 arcminutes in optical (Hubble) and infrared (Webb) light (2025)

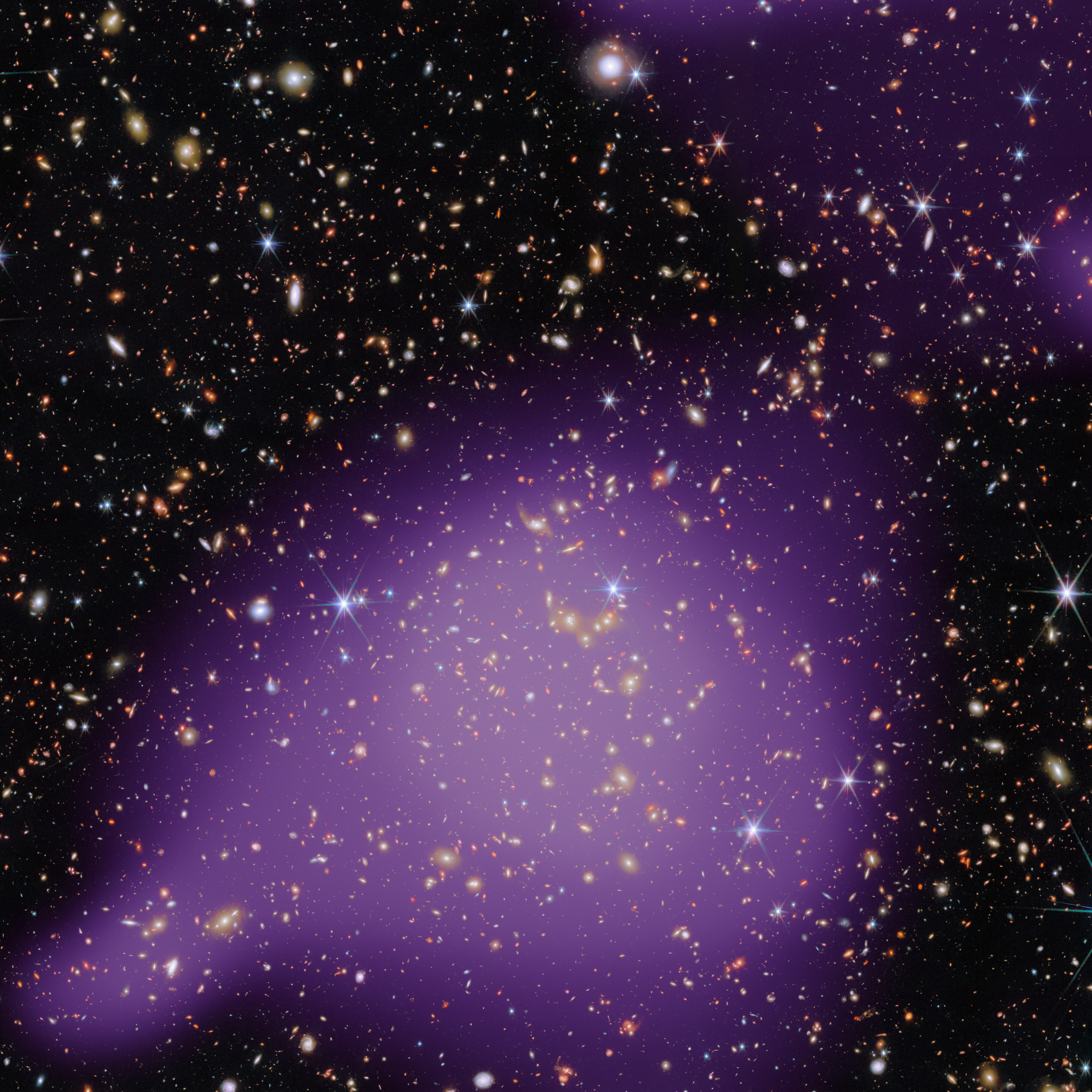
Same image as the one at left but including X-ray (Newton+Chandra) light
